= Modern Greek literature =

The headquarters of National Library of Greece

Modern Greek literature is literature written in Modern Greek, starting in the late Byzantine era in the 11th century AD. It includes work not only from within the borders of the modern Greek state, but also from other areas where Greek was widely spoken, including Istanbul, Asia Minor, and Alexandria.

The first period of modern Greek literature includes texts concerned with philosophy and the allegory of daily life, as well as epic songs celebrating the akritai (Acritic songs), the most famous of which is Digenes Akritas. In the late 16th and early 17th century, Crete flourished under Venetian rule and produced two of the most important Greek texts; Erofili (ca. 1595) by Georgios Chortatzis and Erotokritos (ca. 1600) by Vitsentzos Kornaros. European Enlightenment had a profound effect on Greek scholars, most notably Rigas Feraios and Adamantios Korais, who paved the way for the Greek War of Independence in 1821.

After the establishment of the Kingdom of Greece, intellectual output was centered in the Ionian Islands, and in Athens. The Heptanese School was represented by poets such as Dionysios Solomos, who wrote the national anthem of Greece and Aristotelis Valaoritis, while the Athenian School included figures like Alexandros Rizos Rangavis and Panagiotis Soutsos. In the 19th, the Greek language question arose, as there was an intense dispute between the users of Demotic Greek, i.e. the language of everyday life, and those who favoured Katharevousa, a cultivated imitation of Ancient Greek. Kostis Palamas, Georgios Drossinis, and Kostas Krystallis, who belonged to the so-called 1880s Generation, revitalized Greek letters and helped cement Demotic Greek as the form most used in poetry. Prose also thrived, with writers like Emmanuel Rhoides, Georgios Vizyinos, Alexandros Papadiamantis, and Andreas Karkavitsas.

The most celebrated poets of the verge of the 20th century are Constantine P. Cavafy, Angelos Sikelianos, Kostas Varnalis, and Kostas Karyotakis. As of prose, Nikos Kazantzakis, is the best-known Greek novelist outside Greece. Other important writers of that period are Grigorios Xenopoulos, and Konstantinos Theotokis, while Penelope Delta is noted for her children's stories and novels. The Generation of the '30s first introduced modernist trends in Greek literature. It included writers Stratis Myrivilis, Elias Venezis, Yiorgos Theotokas, and M. Karagatsis, and poets Giorgos Seferis, Andreas Embirikos, Yiannis Ritsos, Nikos Engonopoulos, and Odysseas Elytis. Seferis and Elytis were awarded the Nobel Prize in 1963 and 1979 respectively.

In post-war decades many significant poets were published, such as Tasos Leivaditis, Manolis Anagnostakis, Titos Patrikios, Kiki Dimoula and Dinos Christianopoulos. Dido Sotiriou, Stratis Tsirkas, Alki Zei, Menis Koumandareas, Costas Taktsis, and Thanassis Valtinos are routinely mentioned as some of the most important post-war prose writers, while Iakovos Kambanellis has been described as the "father of post–World War II Greek theater". The 1980s saw the novel take over from poetry as the most prestigious genre in Greek literature, thanks to writers such as Eugenia Fakinou and Rhea Galanaki. Among more recent figures who have achieved critical acclaim and/or commercial success are Petros Markaris, Chrysa Dimoulidou, Isidoros Zourgos, Christos Chomenidis, and Giannis Palavos.

== Periodization ==
There has been much discussion concerning the division of modern Greek literature into distinct eras. It has been suggested that it begins in 1453, the year of the Fall of Constantinople, but most scholars now agree that its onset can be traced in the 11th century, with the epic song of Digenes Akritas. The contemporary high-school syllabus places its beginnings ever earlier, in the 10th century, and divides the history of modern Greek literature as follows:

- First period: from the 10th century until the Fall of Constantinople in 1453
- Second period: the years until the Ottoman Conquest of Crete in 1669
- Third period: the years leading to the independence of Greece in 1830
- Fourth period: the period of the modern Greek state (1830–present)

Another widely accepted periodization is the following:

- 9th century - 1453
- 1453 - 1669
- 1669 - 1821 (start of the Greek War of Independence)
- 1821 - 1880 (emergence of the New Athenian School)
- 1880 - 1930 (emergence of the 1930s Generation)
- 1930–present

== 11th century to 1453 ==
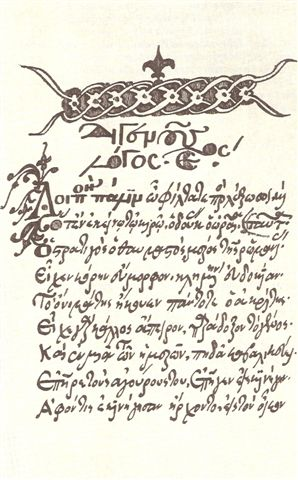
Manuscript of the Byzantine epic Digenes Akritas.

The epic of Digenes Akritas, the most famous of all Acritic songs, is often referred as the starting point of modern Greek literature. This notion is justified by the fact that it is written in a form of Greek that is more familiar to modern-day speakers. In fact, Digenes Akritas and other such epics, like the Song of Armouris, are the first attempts at a literary use of the spoken, common, i.e. modern Greek language. They are narrations of the heroic deeds of the akritai, the guards along the Eastern edge of the Byzantine Empire, and they use the political verse, which was probably a major medium of expression for the illiterate and half-literate members of the Byzantine society. These songs come from all parts of the then Greek-speaking world, and is argued that the oldest ones are from Cyprus, Asia Minor and Pontus.

During the 12th century, Byzantine writers reintroduced the ancient Greek romance literature and many such novels were composed in the following centuries. Perhaps the most popular was Livistros and Rodamni, written by a demotic writer in Cyprus or Crete. Others are Hysimine and Hysimines by Eustathios Makrembolites, Rodanthe and Dosikles by Theodore Prodromos, and Kallimachos and Chrysorrhoe and Belthandros and Chrysantza, both by unknown authors. Theodore Prodromos is sometimes identified as the author of the so-called Ptochoprodromic Poems, a collection of four satiric poems, written in the vernacular. Michael Glykas, who was imprisoned due to his participation in a conspiracy against Manuel I Komnenos, composed a petition in political verse, titled Poetic Lines by M. Glykas Which He Wrote during the Time He Was Detained because of Some Spiteful Informer, using vernacular and classical vocabulary.

Another group of early modern Greek texts is that of allegorical and didactic poems. Story of Ptocholeon is one of the earliest such poems, and has oriental origins, probably Indian. Spaneas, a poem containing moral advice for a young man, was frequently copied. Amusing tales about animals must have also been popular. Examples include the poems Tale about Quadrupeds, dated to 1364, about a meeting of all the animals at the invitation of their king, the lion; the Poulologos, a similar tale about birds; and The Synaxarion of the Estimable Donkey, a 14th century fable of a donkey travelling to the Holy Land with a wolf and a fox. There is also the Porikologos about fruits, written in prose as a parody of the official language of the Byzantine court. In the early 14th century, the vernacular became the accepted medium for fiction of any kind.

== From 1453 to 1669 ==
There are very few signs of intellectual activity during the first two centuries of Ottoman rule, as the Byzantine scholars fled to Italy. Their migration during the decline of the Byzantine Empire and mainly after its dissolution greatly contributed to the transmission and dissemination of Ancient Greek letters in western Europe, and thus in the development of the Renaissance humanism. Such émigrés included Gemistos Plethon, Manuel Chrysoloras, Theodorus Gaza, Cardinal Bessarion, John Argyropoulos, and Demetrios Chalkokondyles. Therefore, from the middle 15th century to the 17th century, the most notable literary texts come from areas under Francocracy, such as Rhodes, the Ionian Islands, and Crete, as well as from Greeks who were active in Italy. Western literature was highly influential, both in content and in form. It is believed by many scholars that the use of rhyme in Greek poetry, despite being sporadically present in works of previous centuries, was a result of that influence.

=== Cretan Renaissance ===
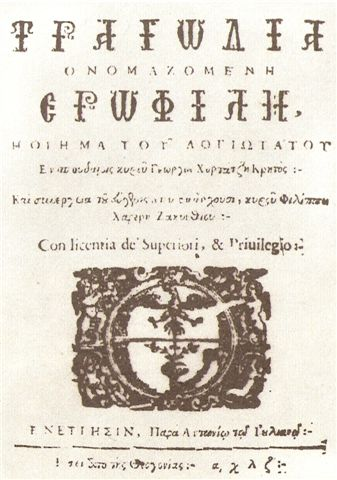
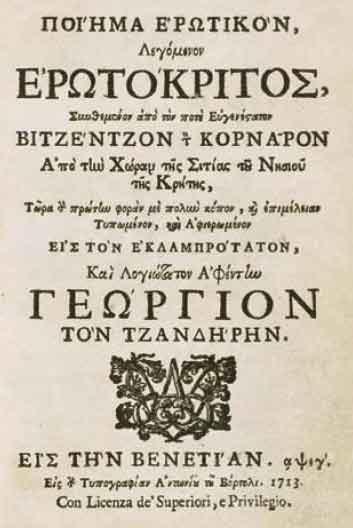
Cover of the 1637 editio princeps of Erophile (left) and a 1713 copy of Erotokritos (right); two major pieces of Cretan Renaissance literature.

Crete was a Stato da Màr from 1205 until 1669. Venetian rule proved troubled from the beginning, but after the mid-16th century the change of policy towards natives and the improvement in welfare of both communities, led to a long period of peaceful coexistence and cultural crossfertilization. Some scholars even talk about a shared Veneto-Cretan cultural consciousness. Italian influence is apparent in these works, but there is a distinctive "Greekness" nonetheless. As David Holton has put it: "Crete is the place par excellence where the meeting of the West with the Greek East took place." The first important works of Cretan literature appear in the 14th and early 15th centuries. Stephanos Sahlikis, the first known Greek poet to use the couplet form consistently, wrote humorous poems with autobiographical elements, such as Praise of Pothotsoutsounia, Council of the Whores and The Remarkable Story of the Humble Sachlikis. Janus Plousiadenos' Lamentation of the Mother of God on the Passion of Christ, a religious poem, was arguably quite popular. Nevertheless, perhaps the most important of these early texts, is Apokopos by Bergadis. It was probably written around 1400, and is the earliest known vernacular text to have passed into printed form, in 1509. Composed in rhyming couplets in political verses, it is a tale of a trip to Hades which pokes fun at religion and popular beliefs of that time. Other known poets are Marinos Falieros, and Leonardos Dellaportas.

The heyday of Cretan Renaissance literature is placed between 1590 and the Ottoman conquest of Crete in 1669. The principal characteristic of this period is that almost all the works are dramas. The two most prominent figures are Georgios Chortatzis and Vitsentzos Kornaros.

Georgios Chortatzis' Erofili (ca. 1595) is deemed as the finest play of Cretan theatre. Written in the local idiom, it is a violent tragedy narrating the condemned love between Erofili, daughter of the Egyptian king Philogonos, and the youth Panaretos. Before Erofili, Chortatzis also wrote Katzourbos, a comedy, and Panoria, an influential pastoral drama. Vitsentzos Kornaros is best-known for Erotokritos (ca. 1600), which is regarded as the undoubted masterpiece of this period, and one of the greatest achievements of modern Greek literature. It is a poem of over 10,000 rhyming 15-syllable iambic verses in the Cretan dialect, narrating the chivalrous love of Erotokritos for the princess Aretousa and their union after long and arduous adventures of deception and intrigue. Kornaros is also believed by some to be the author of The Sacrifice of Abraham (1635), a religious drama inspired by the famous episode of the Old Testament, considered a landmark of Cretan theatre.

Other surviving plays are the comedies Fortounatos (ca. 1662) by Markos Antonios Foskolos, and anonymous Stathis, (Note: Some scholars accredit Stathis to Chortatzis, albeit not categorically.) and the dramatic King Rodolinos (1647) by Andreas Troilos. Voskopoula (ca. 1600), a short narrative poem of unknown author, is the only non-drama text of this period, apart from Erotokritos.

=== Ionian islands, Aegean Archipelago, and Cyprus ===
In the 16th and 17th centuries Ionian islands, some lyric poetry existed alongside a didactic or hagiographical prose tradition, much of which was printed in Venice. Corfiot Iakovos Trivolis wrote The Story of Tagapiera, a panegyric of a Venetian admiral, and The History of the King of Scotland and the Queen of England, a tale taken from Boccaccio's Decameron, or, more possibly, from one of its imitations. Alexios Rartouros, also from Corfu, devised a prototype of popular preaching in his Sermons (1560). In 1526, Nikolaos Loukanis, who lived in Venice, printed a paraphrase translation of Homer's Iliad, noted for being the most lavishly illustrated edition of any vernacular Greek work. Teodoro Montseleze's religious drama Eugena (editio princeps in 1646) is the only extant play from that period. Other known authors are Markos Defanaras from Zakynthos, and Ioannikios Kartanos from Corfu.

Even though lyric poetry was popular in Rhodes, a territorial entity of the Knights Hospitaller between 1310 and 1522, only a few texts have survived. Erotopaignia, the most prominent of them, was written in the mid-15th century. Emmanuel Georgillas or Limenitis, wrote The Plague of Rhodes, a narrative poem about the plague that hit the city of Rhodes in 1498. To him is also attributed one of the surviving versions of The Tale of Belisarius, a poem relating the exploits and unjust punishment of general Belisarius.

Cyprus was also an important intellectual center, evidenced mainly by the Cypriot Canzoniere, a 16th century anthology of 156 poems. They are translations and imitations of poems by Petrarch, Jacopo Sannazaro, Pietro Bembo, and others. Unlike other contemporary texts, they are written in the Italian hendecasyllable and in a variety of forms familiar to the Renaissance (sonnets, octaves, terzinas, sestinas, barzelettas, etc). In fact, this collection contains the first true sonnets in Greek language, and is widely considered one of the highest points of Renaissance literature in Greek language. Cyprus also had a significant tradition of prose chronicles in the Cypriot dialect, the most notable were written by Leontios Machairas and Georgios Boustronios, which together with all literary output declined after the subjugation by the Ottomans.

17th century Chios, saw significant theatrical activity, in the form of religious plays, which in the best cases show facets of the high Baroque, and Rococo. Examples include Eleazar and the Seven Maccabee Boys by Michael Vestarchis, Three Boys in the Furnace by Grigorios Kontaratos and Drama of the Man Who Was Born Blind by Gabriel Prosopsas.

== From 1669 to 1830 ==
After 1669, many Cretans fled to the Ionian islands, thus transplanting the rich Cretan theatrical tradition there. Tragedy Zenon, played in 1683, was written by an anonymous Cretan playwright. Petros Katsaitis' tragedies Ifigenia (1720) and Thyestes (1721), and Savoyas Soumerlis' satirical Comedy of the Pseudo-Doctors (1745) are evidently modelled after Cretan plays, alongside the influence from late Renaissance tragedy, commedia dell'arte, and Italian theatre in general. Theatrical activity of the Aegean islands was continued in the first decades of the 18th century. Examples include the anonymus David, written in frankochiotika, and Tragedy of St. Demetrius, performed in 1723 on Naxos. The most important poem of the early 18th century is Flowers of Piety (1708), a miscellany edited by boarding students at the Flanginian College in Venice. Ecclesiastical rhetoric makes up a significant part of the intellectual output of the time, with the likes of Ilias Miniatis, and Frangiskos Skoufos.

=== Enlightenment ===
Greek Enlightenment, also known as Diafotismos (Διαφωτισμός), was influenced primarily by the French and German variations, but it was also based on the rich heritage of Byzantine culture. Its chronological limits can be loosely placed between 1750 and 1830, with the years 1774 to 1821 marking the zenith. In essence, the historical cycle of the Enlightenment for the Greeks ends with the outbreak of the War of Independence, some time after the end of the European Enlightenment. Essentially, Diafotismos was a string of educational initiatives, such as translation of classics, compilation of dictionaries, and establishment of schools. The literary production of this era points to clear intellectual trends: a turn towards the classics and the sciences, the formation of a new moral order, and, above all, emancipation from Church authority. Phanar in Istanbul became an intellectual centre of high importance, due to the Phanariots, members of the Greek elite of the Ottoman Empire, who had acquired great wealth and influence during the 17th century. Phanariots were also active in the Danubian Principalities, where many of them were appointed Hospodars, and the Russian Empire. So pivotal was their role, that the 18th century has been named "the century of the Phanariots."

Paschalis Kitromilides identifies scholars Methodios Anthrakites, Antonios Katiphoros, Vikentios Damodos, and Nikolaos Mavrocordatos as the precursors of Diafotismos. Mavrocordatos's novel Parerga of Philotheos (1718) did not have any effect on the development of Greek letters, (Note: Parerga of Philotheos was only published in 1800.) but today it can be viewed as a forerunner of the new era of Greek literature. Kaisarios Dapontes lived a turbulent life and, after becoming a monk, he wrote numerous poems, such as Mirror of Women, Garden of Graces, and Concise Canon of Many Amazing Things to be Found in Many Cities, Islands, Nations and Animals. His works were very popular among all walks of life, and he is today regarded as the most important poet of his age.

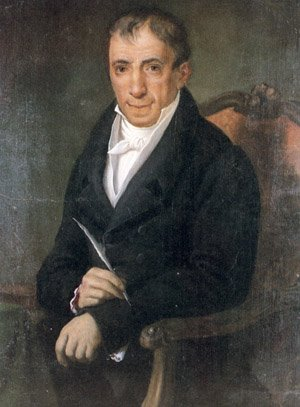
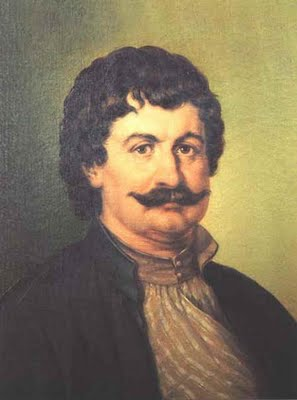
Adamantios Korais and Rigas Feraios, the two foremost exponents of Greek Enlightenment

Clergyman Evgenios Voulgaris was the first great figure of Diafotismos. His oeuvre, consisting of translations of Voltaire, pamphlets, treatises, essays and poems, had a decisive impact on the course of the movement. Iosipos Moisiodax, Christodoulos Pablekis, and Dimitrios Katartzis were also significant representatives of modern Greek Enlightenment, although they did not contribute to literature per se.

Adamantios Korais worked on political writings and translations of ancient and contemporary texts, but his central position in the history of Greek literature is due to his conception of Katharevousa, a purified form of the Greek language. He also was instrumental in the founding of Hermes o Logios, the most important periodical prior to the War of Independence. His prefaces to the first four books of Homer's Iliad (known as The Running Reverend) mark a launching pad for modern prose narrative.

The ferment created by the French Revolution in Greek politics and social thought in the last decade of the eighteenth century found its most dramatic expression in the intellectual and political activities of Rigas Feraios. Feraios translated foreign authors and wrote revolutionary texts and poems, of which Thourios is the most famous. Although his plans for an armed revolt against the Ottomans failed, he served as an inspiration for future generations and has been named the "National Bard".

Cultivation of literature is detected mostly in the last quarter of the 18th century, and intensified in the years preceding the War of Independence. In 1785, Georgios N. Soutsos wrote The Unscrupulous Voevod Alexandros, a three-act comedy in prose, with which the genre of Phanariot satire begins. The 1789 untitled libel by an unknown author (notnamed "Anonymus of 1789") is considered the first manifestation of creative prose in modern Greek. Another important text of this genre is Anglofrancorussian (1805), a satire written in verse that became a kind of manifesto for the new ideology of the Enlightenment in its most extreme version. Other examples include The Character of Valachia (ca. 1800), The Return, or The Lantern of Diogenes (1809), and The Comedy of the Apple of Discord (before 1820), all by unknown authors.

Poetry was centered around two poles: Phanariots and those affected by the phanariot spirit; and the Heptanesians. Alexander Mavrocordatos Firaris, Dionisie Fotino, Michael Perdikaris, Georgios Sakellarios, and Athanasios Christopoulos belong to the first group, with Sakellarios and Christopoulos considered the most important. Phanariot poetry of the time covered many different themes, including romantic love, allegory and satire. On the other hand, Ionians mostly wrote patriotic and satirical poems. Antonios Martelaos, Thomas Danelakis, and Nikolaos Koutouzis are called pre-Solomians (i.e. those preceding Dionysios Solomos), and are the precursors of the flourishing of Heptanese poetry in the following years. Ioannis Vilaras, an important intellectual figure, is a distinct case, not only because his poems were published posthumously, during the War of Independence, but also because he cannot be categorized in any of the aforementioned literary groups.

In the Ionian islands theatrical performances were quite frequent, usually in the form of sketches, isolated scenes from the Cretan dramas, and adaptations of foreign plays. From the indigenous output, Dimitrios Gouzelis's comedy Chasis (1790 or 1795) is by far the most notable.

=== War of Independence ===
The War of Independence against the Ottoman Empire broke out in early 1821 and had an immediate and profound effect on Greek literature. In mainland Greece, literature was sidelined but not nullified, as men of letters tried to inject enthusiasm into the population. Folk poetry, essentially songs inspired by events of the times, also proliferated. Literature proper was nourished mainly in the Ionian islands, now a British protectorate, but maintaining strong cultural ties with Italy.

Andreas Kalvos was born in Zakynthos, but lived most of his early years abroad, many of which accompanying Ugo Foscolo as his secretary. His work in Greek consists of two collections published while living in Switzerland and France, The Lyre (1824) and Lyric Poems (1826). These twenty odes are celebrations of the Greek revolution, and combine Neoclassicism with Romanticism. Kalvos also wrote a few poems and three tragedies in Italian, and prose texts in English. His poetry was met with indifference by his contemporaries, but was rediscovered and reassessed in the late 19th century.

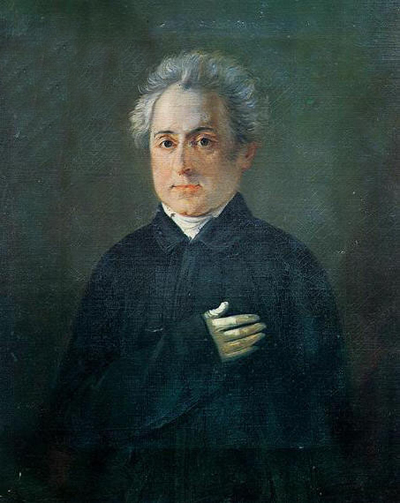
Dionysios Solomos is the national poet of Greece

Dionysios Solomos hailed from Zakynthos, too, and studied in Italy, where he was introduced to the ideas of the Enlightenment, Classicism and emerging Romanticism. His first poems were written in Italian, but his appearance in Greek letters coincides with the commencement of the War. (Note: His first poem in Greek was The Blonde Girl, written in 1822.) In 1823, Solomos composed Hymn to Liberty, a poem of 158 quatrains, the first two stanzas of which constitute the national anthem of Greece. During that period he also wrote The Destruction of Psara, The Free Besieged, and The Woman of Zakynthos. Solomos is characterized by experimentalism in both language and form, having introduced into Greek a number of Western metrics (e.g. ottava rima, terza rima) that freed Greek poetry from the compulsion toward the decapentasyllabic verse. His poems were written in the demotic language, showcasing that it can be used in poetry of high aesthetic quality.

Literary activity in Ionian islands was not limited to poetry. Ioannis Zambelios from Lefkada was a prolific writer, recognised for his attempts to revive Greek theatre. He also wrote short stories, poems, and essays. Zakynthian noblewoman Elizabeth Moutzan-Martinegou is considered the first female writer of modern Greece. She translated works of ancient literature and wrote poems and plays, most of which are now lost. Today, she is best remembered for her autobiography, and has been described as the "progenitor of Greek feminist thought".

== From 1830 to 1930 ==
=== First decades after the liberation ===
Between 1830 and 1880, Romanticism was the dominant movement in Greek literature. As the first Greek state consisted only of a small section of the present-day Greek mainland and a few islands, nationalism was ever-present in literature of the first decades, but gradually other themes emerged. The Ionian islands reunited with Greece in 1864 and continued being a major intellectual centre. Simultaneously, several men of letters from unredeemed lands had congregated in Athens, spurring the formation of the so-called First Athenian School. Moreover, many participants of the War of Independence, including Theodoros Kolokotronis, Christoforos Perraivos, Emmanuil Xanthos, and Nikolaos Kasomoulis, wrote memoirs. The importance of these testimonial texts lies not only on historiographical grounds, but on their literary value as well, since they are written in a lively demotic language. Especially Yannis Makriyannis's memoir, written between 1829 and 1850, is indeed considered a landmark of Greek literature.

Heptanese literature was marked by Solomos reaching his poetical maturity, as well as by the appearance of many other authors. Poet and politician Aristotelis Valaoritis was a central figure of this new generation. He developed an epic manner with romantic contrasts, deriving his themes from the War of Independence and the acts of the klephts. Georgios Tertsetis published a wide array of texts (eulogies, essays, journalism, plays, and lyric verse) and assisted Revolution veterans write their memoirs. Other writers include Iakovos Polylas, disciple of Solomos with important work on philology and translation, Andreas Laskaratos, noted for his satirical texts, and Gerasimos Markoras, best known for the heroic poem The Oath.

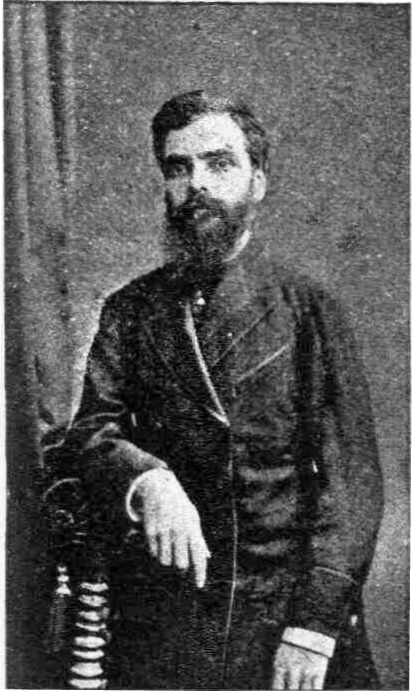
Emmanuel Rhoides

Alexandros Soutsos, who published his first poems during the War of Independence, is considered the initiator of the First Athenian School. It is generally accepted that he and his brother Panagiotis introduced Romantic movement into liberated Greece. Panagiotis Soutsos is known for his work on both poetry and prose, as well as for being the first to envisage and propose the revival of the ancient Olympic Games.

Alexandros Rizos Rangavis was a multifarious author of great significance. He produced poetry, plays, dictionaries, books of philological and archaeological interest, and wrote Greece's first historical novel, The Lord of Morea (1850). Demetrios Bernardakis (Maria Doxapatri - 1858, Fausta - 1893) was a major playwright of the time. However, as Katharevousa is an "un-theatrical" language, his work is largely forgotten.

Initially, representatives of the Athenian School accepted the coexistence of the two languages, i.e. Demotic Greek and Katharevousa, but as time went on they championed the latter. Its representatives took French Romanticism as a model, in contrast to the Ionian writers who were influenced by the Italian counterpart.

Even though prose fiction was mostly cultivated in Athens, the foremost examples of this period were far from the spirit of the Athenian School. Iakovos Pitsipios' satire Xouth the Ape (1849) makes up Greece's first sociological novel. The Papess Joanne (1866) is the best-known book of Emmanuel Rhoides, a fierce and indefatigable satirist. Inspired by the famous legend, it is today considered a classic of Greek literature. Historical novel Loukis Laras (1879) by Demetrios Vikelas, a prolific author and translator, stands out for its naturalistic style and marked the beginning of a new era for Greek prose.

=== New Athenian School and beyond ===
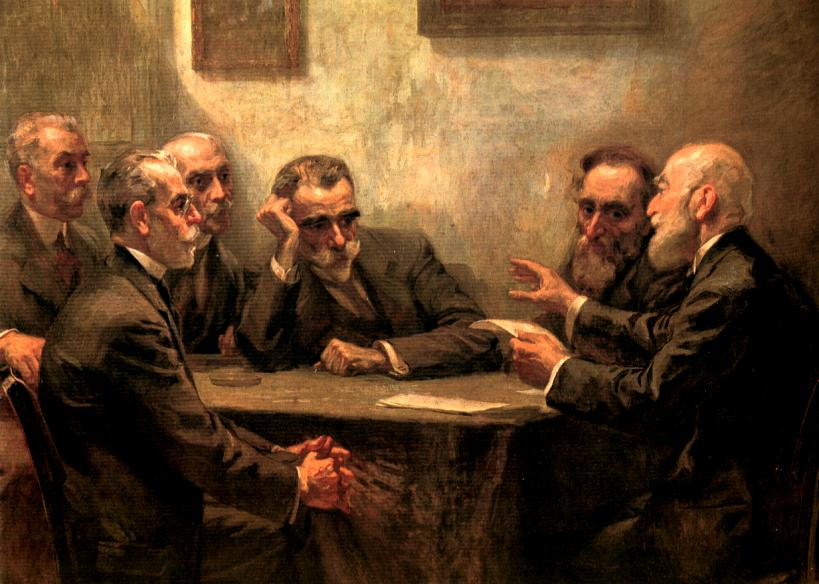
Parnassos Literary Society. From left to right: Georgios Stratigis, Georgios Drossinis, Ioannis Polemis, Kostis Palamas, Georgios Souris, and Aristomenis Provelengios

In the late 19th century, an influx of new literary movements (Parnassianism, Naturalism, Symbolism, Realism) rejuvenated Greek literature. 1880 is considered a watershed, due to the publication of two poetic collections that reflect this process: Spider Webs by Georgios Drossinis and Verses by Nikos Kambas. It is in fact the debut of a new poetical generation, known as the 1880s Generation or the New Athenian School. Poets associated with it, stood for a rejection of Katharevousa and distanced themselves from Romantic form and content, which was now greatly based on rural life, village sketches, folk material, and everyday events.

Kostis Palamas, who dominated the Greek literary scene for almost fifty years, is regarded as the chief proponent of the New Athenian School. He produced some prose writings and a play, but he is best known as a poet and literary critic. Palamas promoted, perhaps more than any of his contemporaries, the use of the colloquial language in literature, establishing its eventual dominance. Among his numerous poetic collections, perhaps the most important are Iambs and Anapests (1897), Life Immovable (1904), The Dodecalogue of the Gypsy (1907), and The King's Flute (1910).

Georgios Souris, frequently called "the modern Aristophanes", was immensely popular at the time. He contributed satirical poems to Asmodaios and held a high-esteemed literary salon at his home, which was frequented by the likes of Palamas, Zacharias Papantoniou, and Babis Anninos.

Apart from those aforementioned, Aristomenis Provelengios, Georgios Stratigis, Ioannis Polemis, Kostas Krystallis, and Ioannis Gryparis are also considered members of the New Athenian School. Perhaps the most prominent among them are Krystallis, famous for his bucolic poems, and Gryparis who wrote some of the finest sonnets of Greek literature.

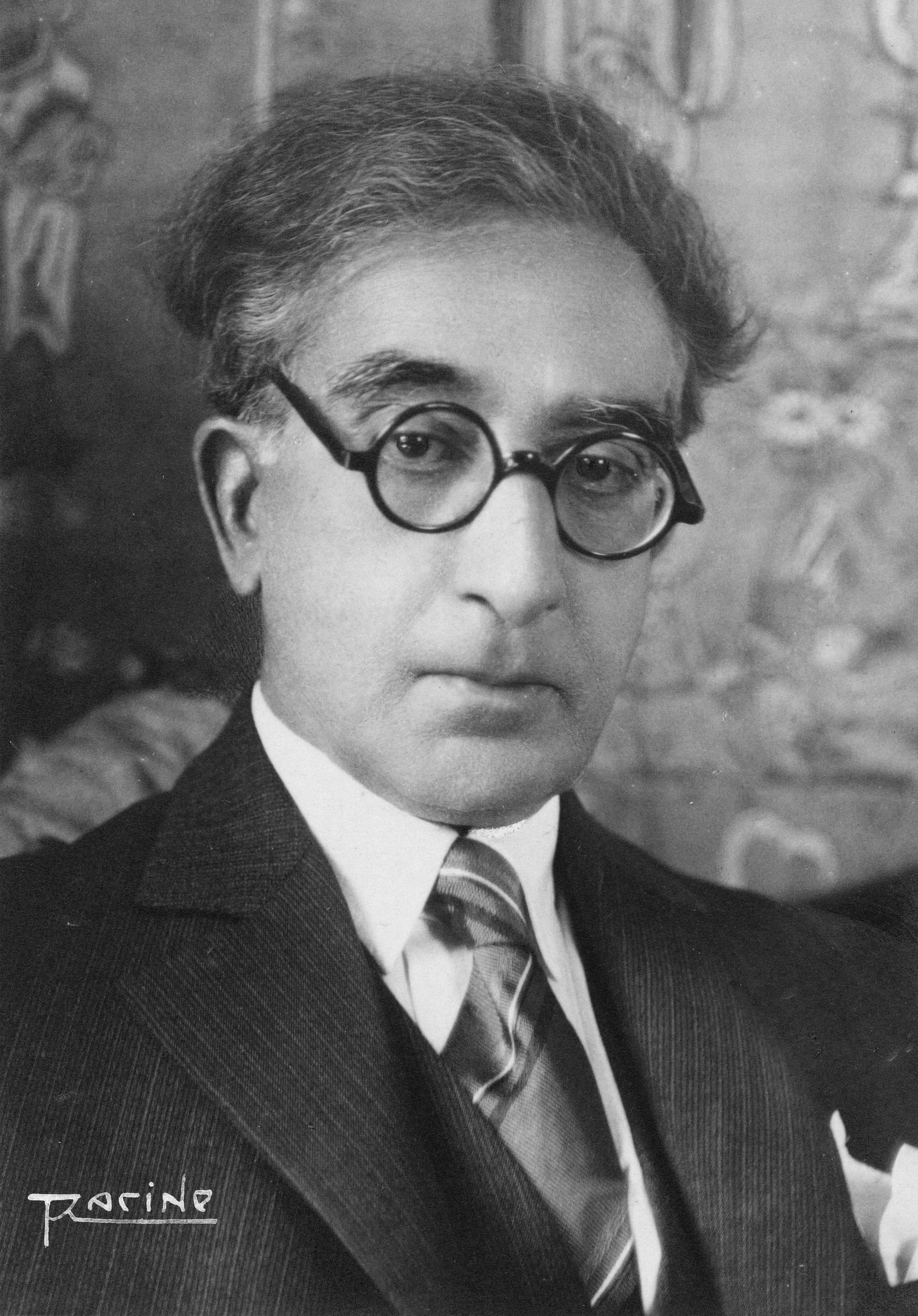
Constantine P. Cavafy

Constantine P. Cavafy, an adherent of Symbolism, Decadence, and Aestheticism, wrote both historical and lyric poetry with equally erotic sensibility, in a subtle mixture of demotic and purist Greek. He denied or even ridiculed traditional values of Christianity, patriotism, and heterosexuality. Cavafy was underestimated by his contemporaries, but his influence on subsequent generations to this day is unsurpassed. He is one of the greatest poets of modern Greece, and probably the most famous abroad. Among his best-known poems are Waiting for the Barbarians, Walls, Thermopylae, and Ithaca.

Kostas Varnalis produced a variety of writings, including prose and criticism, but he is principally revered for his poems reflecting his Marxist ideology. Particularly his compositions The Burning Light (1922) and Besieged Slaves (1927), characterized by effective satire and daring language, secured him a unique place in the history of modern Greek literature. Varnalis was highly influential and is seen as the inaugural figure in the long tradition of 20th-century leftish Greek poetics.

Other major poets who can be described as distinct cases are Lorentzos Mavilis and Angelos Sikelianos. Mavilis, an eminent sonneteer, saw his first poems published in the 1890s, but followed the Heptanese tradition, in which he incorporated symbolistic elements. Sikelianos is renowned for his powerful lyricism and his use of free verse, the first Greek to do so. He caught the readership's eyes with the collection The Light-Shadowed (1909) and by his death in 1951, he had left an extensive literary oeuvre that contains great richness of expression.

Around the 1880s, a boom in short story publication reshaped prose writing. A new type of narrative, ethography, (Note: From the Greek word ηθογραφία ithographia. It has also been translated in English as "genre story".) was formed on the bases of Realism and Naturalism. Its principal characteristic is the detailed depiction of a small, more or less contemporary, traditional community in its physical setting. The heyday of ethography is roughly placed between 1880 and 1900.

Georgios Vizyinos, mainly a short-story writer, is thought of as the pioneer of modern Greek prose He published most of his tales, including the iconic My Mother's Sin, Who Was the Killer of My Brother?, and The Only Journey of His Life, between 1883 and 1884. Vizyinos was the first to deal with important issues of modern Greek literature, such as the concepts of ‘structure’ and ‘difference’, and the effectiveness of the literary text.

Alexandros Papadiamantis stands among the most popular Greek prose writers. A prolific author, he wrote over 200 novels, novellas and short stories, of which The Merchants of the Nations (1883), The Gypsy Girl (1884), Dream on the Wave (1900), and The Murderess (1903) stand out. Papadiamantis used techniques unknown to Greek readers at the time, and created an aesthetic mould that was closer to Greek reality.

Another important exponent of ethography was Andreas Karkavitsas. He mostly wrote short stories, but his undoubted masterpiece is the novella The Beggar (1896). Like the other major prose writers of the time, he wrote in Katharevousa. However, he later became a strong supporter of Demotic.

Grigorios Xenopoulos had an abundant output of short stories, novels, plays, and literary criticism. While his prose work is by no means of negligible significance, Xenopoulos is mostly revered for his contributions to theater; plays like The Secret of Countess Valeraina (1904), Fotini Santri (1908), and Stella Violanti (1909) have earned him the characterization of a "stunning figure" of modern Greek theatre. He was also the co-founder of Nea Estia, the most prestigious literary periodical in Greece.

Nikos Kazantzakis cannot be easily subsumed to any particular period; while his career began in 1906, his most successful works were published during the decade of 1940 and afterwards. These include the novels Zorba the Greek (1946), Christ Recrucified (1951), Captain Michalis (1953), and The Last Temptation (1955). The author himself however, considered the long poem Odyssey (1938) as his magnum opus. He also wrote theatrical plays, travel books, memoirs and essays. Kazantzakis is extensively revered and is the most famous Greek novelist outside Greece.

Konstantinos Theotokis wrote both prose and poetry. His best known works (Honor and Money - 1912, The Convict - 1919, Slaves in their Chains - 1922) lie in the realm of social realism. Other authors of note from this period are Konstantinos Chatzopoulos and Dimosthenis Voutyras.

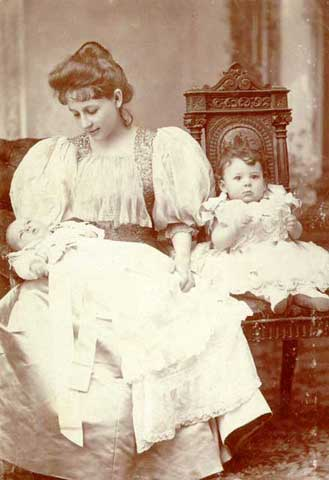
Penelope Delta

Penelope Delta has earned a special reputation with her books for young readers, and is recognized as the first great writer of children literature in Greece. Some of her most widely read novels are Fairy Tale without Name (1910), In the Years of the Bulgar-Slayer (1911), and The Secrets of the Marshes (1937). Delta was also an avid supporter of the movement to universalize the use of the demotic language in school.

The disastrous ending of the Greco-Turkish War in 1922 signalled a period of manifold crises. In poetry, the lofty style of Palamas and Sikelianos was replaced by gentle lyricism that sprang from the convergence of Symbolism and Aestheticism. It was manifested by a distinct group of poets, sometimes called "the generation of 1920," whose main common characteristic was a feeling of decadence and pessimism. In this group belong Napoleon Lapathiotis, Kostas Ouranis, Kostas Karyotakis, Tellos Agras, and Maria Polydouri. Karyotakis is generally regarded as the finest of them. His poetry excellently renders the atmosphere of the time and has been very influential to future generations. His suicide in 1928, at the age of 31, had a profound effect and set a fashion for melancholy and sardonic verse that became known as Karyotakism.

== From 1930 to World War II ==
The decade of the 1930 was pivotal in the development of Greek literature. The Generation of the '30s refers to a diverse group of illustrious writers and poets who introduced Modernism into Greek literature. This innovation was more apparent in poetry than in prose though, as many fiction writers continued employing older techniques and models.

The literary magazine Nea Grammata, which commenced circulation in 1935, constituted a hub for the major representatives of this group.

=== Poetry ===
The poets of the '30s Generation were largely influenced by Anglo-American modernism and French Surrealism. Particularly the latter exerted wide influence on them. They examined themes such as tradition, memory and history.

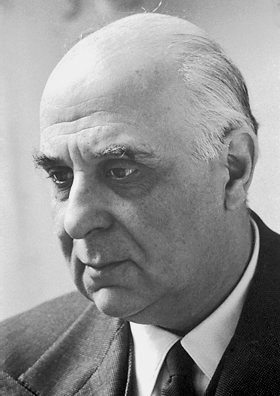
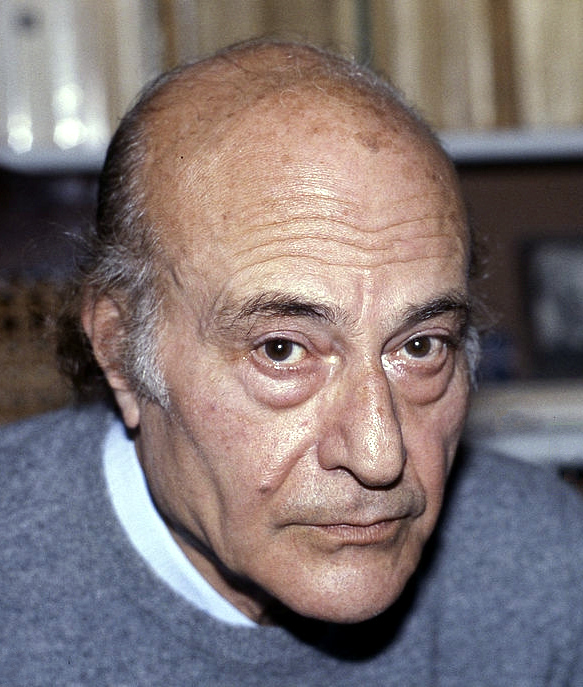
Nobel Prize laureautes Giorgos Seferis and Odysseas Elytis are both associated with the Generation of the '30s

The most important poets of the Generation of the '30s are Giorgos Seferis, Odysseas Elytis, Andreas Embirikos, Nikos Engonopoulos, Yannis Ritsos, and Nikiforos Vrettakos.

Giorgos Seferis is regarded by some as the leading figure of the Generation of the '30s. His debut, the collection Strophe (1931), represented innovation and an exercise in renewing the versified stanza. However, his most definitive work and the most truly representative text of Greek Modernism is the compound poem Mythistorema (1935), which contains the basic concepts and recurring themes of the poetry to follow: common, almost unpoetic speech and a continued intermingling of history and mythology. In 1963, Seferis became the first Greek to be awarded the Nobel Prize in Literature.

Odysseas Elytis published his first poems in 1935. His experience in the Greco-Italian War marked him deeply and was later recast in one of his most famous compositions, Lay Heroic and Funeral for the Fallen Second Lieutenant in Albania (1946). Other works of his are It is Worthy (1959), widely referred as his masterpiece, The Sovereign Sun (1971), and The Monogram (1972). In his compositions, modernist European poetics and Greek literary tradition are fused in a highly original lyrical voice. In 1979, Elytis was awarded the Nobel Prize in Literature.

Andreas Embirikos is the initiator of Greek Surrealism. His 1935 debut, Blast Furnace, written with the automatic method, contains the first surrealist poems in Greek. It holds a unique place in modern Greek poetry, largely due to its groundbreaking structure and absence of logical coherence. Other works by Embirikos include the poetic collection Hinterland (1945) and The Great Eastern (1991), the longest, most sexually explicit of all Greek novels.

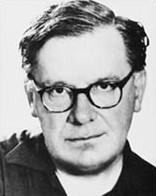
Nikos Engonopoulos

Alongside Embirikos, Nikos Engonopoulos is the foremost figure of Greek Surrealism. Many of his volumes, including Don't talk to the Driver (1938), and The Pianos of Silence (1939), irritated or even shocked the readers. The peak achievement of his poetry, however, is considered Bolivar (1944), which goes beyond Surrealism.

Yiannis Ritsos was inordinately prolific and excelled in several poetic forms. More than 100 volumes were published in his lifetime, but his best-known are Epitaphios (1936), Romiosini (1954), and Moonlight Sonata (1956). Regularly persecuted for his political beliefs, Ritsos is seen as an ideal combination of the qualities of the engaged citizen committed to his public duty, and the expression of the naturally restless and "libertarian" artist. His figure has been extremely influential, permeating the post-Civil War generation of leftist poets.

Nikiforos Vrettakos started under the strong influence of Karyotakism. Later on, he introduced Surrealistic elements in his poetry, thus standing next to the other members of the '30s Generation. Love for mankind, nature and lyricism with a happy disposition are the main characteristics of his most mature work. He left an extended oeuvre of poems, prose, and essays.

Melissanthi, Nikos Kavvadias and Nikos Gatsos are another three notable poets of that era. They co-existed with the Generation of the '30s but are seldom considered part of it. Melissanthi, frequently numbered among the most significant women Greek poets, is known for the poetic collections Insect Voices (1930), Prophecies (1931), and The Barrier of Silence (1965). Her work has been described as an affirmation of death, rife with metaphysical agony and empathic humanism. Kavvadias is one of the most beloved poets in Greece. A sailor by profession, he took the readership by surprise with his first collection, Marabu (1933). He reappeared in 1947 with Fog, but the rest of his poetic work was published posthumously. His poems about life at sea combine modernist techniques with traditional elements, such as rhyme. Gatsos published only one collection, Amorgos (1943), which however established him as one of the most prominent Greek surrealists.

=== Prose ===
In contrast to poetry, most fiction writers of the '30s Generation were not so much concerned with discovering new literary modes. Nonetheless, they revitalized prose by turning their eyes to broader horizons, trying to trace more complicated psychological conditions, and facing more serious social and human problems. Furthermore, they went beyond the limits of the short form and expressed themselves in the contemporary form par excellence, the novel.

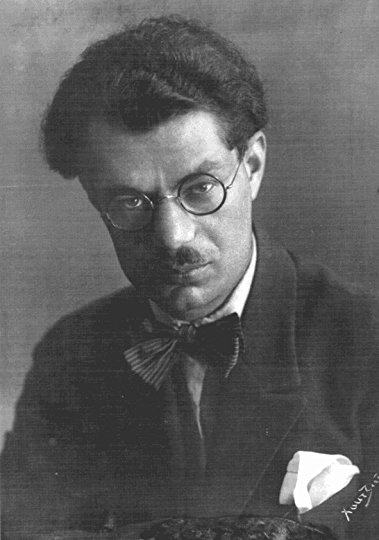
Stratis Myrivilis

Some writers belonging in the Generation of '30s, had actually made their debut earlier. Such an example is Stratis Doukas and Photis Kontoglou, a vigorous intellectual, who worked as a novelist, critic, art professor, restorer, and icon painter. His work is difficult to place within any literary group, school or movement, yet he is habitually considered part of the Generation of the '30s. Kontoglou brought considerable change at the time, due to his evocative language and enchanting fable-like stories (Pedro Cazas - 1920, Vasanta - 1923, etc).

Stratis Myrivilis was a veteran of the Balkan Wars, the Greco-Turkish War, and World War I, thus war is the dominant theme in his books. He is best known for Life in the Tomb (1930), a novel recounting the experiences of a sergeant on the Macedonian front. Its great significance lies on its anti-war message, as well as the author's attempt to depict local idioms. His other books include The Schoolmistress with the Golden Eyes (1933), Vasilis Arvanitis (1943), and The Mermaid Madonna (1949).

Elias Venezis is the author of the Number 31328 (1931), one of the most powerful accounts in Greek of the horror of imprisonment and enslavement, which drew heavily on his ordeal as a prisoner in the Turkish labour battalions during the Greco-Turkish War. Venezis also wrote Tranquility (1939) and Aeolian Earth (1943), classics of modern Greek literature as well.

Yiorgos Theotokas was a diverse personality, having worked on many forms, most notably prose, drama, and essay. His novels, of which Argo (1936) and Patients and Travellers (1964) stand out, cover a wide spectrum of political, societal and psychological themes. His 1929 essay Free Spirit is seen by many as the intellectual manifesto of the '30s Generation.

Unlike many of his contemporaries, M. Karagatsis didn't rely on personal experience for his books. He handled a vast array of narrative forms, ranging from the historical to the social, to fantasy literature and exotic adventure, using a charming language and displaying highly original plots. His best novels are Colonel Lyapkin (1933), Chimaera (1936), Jungermann (1938) and The 10 (1960). Karagatsis is probably the most avidly read fiction writer of this generation.

Kosmas Politis (Lemon Grove - 1930, Eroica - 1937, At Hadjifrangou's - 1962), Angelos Terzakis (The Violet City - 1937, Princess Isabeau - 1945), and Pandelis Prevelakis (Chronicle of a Town - 1938, The Sun of Death - 1959) are also major prose writers of the Generation of the '30s.

Compared to the abovementioned authors, Giannis Skarimbas and Melpo Axioti displayed more obvious modern preoccupations. Skarimbas left a diverse body of work, including poetry and drama, but he is best remembered for his novels and novellas, where he employs an iconoclastic, avant-garde style. These include The Divine Goat (1933), Mariambas (1935), Figaro's Solo (1939), and The Waterloo of Two Fools (1959). Axioti is one of the most important women writers in modern Greek letters. Her books, such as Difficult Nights (1938) and Shall we dance, Maria? (1940), are noted for their style and originality. She is also known for the poetic collections Coincidence (1939) and Contraband (1959). In the same modernist vein are Nikos Gabriel Pentzikis, and Stelios Xefloudas.

== Post-war literature ==
After the liberation from the Triple Occupation, the Greek Civil War broke out. Life did not return to normality before 1950, but the great trials of the War have been reflected in creative literature. An unprecedented number of new poets emerged, while already established writers continued dominating the literary scene.

=== Poetry ===
Poets who began writing poetry in the first two decades after the end of World War II dealt with the bleakness of the Occupation and the Civil War and the belying of the widespread hope for a better future following the collapse of Nazism. At the same time, others adopted an existential approach in order to focus on themes such as the meaning of life and of death or the painful daily routine of the body. Stylistically, despite trying to break away from the Generation of the '30s, they followed their paradigm of low-key voice and abstract or elliptic forms of expression.

The poetry of the so-called first post-war generation is exemplified by Manolis Anagnostakis, Aris Alexandrou, Tassos Livaditis, and Titos Patrikios. Takis Sinopoulos, Miltos Sachtouris, Eleni Vakalo, Nanos Valaoritis, and Nikos Karouzos are major representatives of this cluster as well. Also, as a representative of the eclectic Thessaloniki Circle of poets, which thrived during the period, one would find the poetic work of Zoe Karelli.

Manolis Anagnostakis' grim experiences during World War II and the Civil War are given expression in his poetry, which is characterized by coexistence of lyricism and satire. His poetic output is rather brief, but it has had a disproportionate influence on contemporary Greek literature. Epochs I, his debut collection, was published in 1945, but his personal pinnacle is The Target (1971).

Aris Alexandrou wrote poems characterised by strangely lyrical verses. His poetic body of work, out of which Still this Spring (1946) and Bankrupt Line (1952) stand out, is limited but significant nevertheless. However, it is often overshadowed by the success of his only novel, Mission Box (1975).

Tassos Livaditis combined lyricism and sensitivity with rage. His involvement into left-wing politics formed the basis for his first poems, but he later turned to pure existentialism, in which his childhood memories combine with discreet, rather obscure religious references. Some of his best known works are Battle at the Edge of the Night (1952), It's Windy at the World's Crossroads (1953), and Violin for One-armed Man (1976).

Titos Patrikios is a poet whose main preoccupations are politics, love and everyday existence. His verses are defined by clarity of thought, mild pessimism and scepticism. Some of his collections are Dirt Road (1954), Apprenticeship (1963), and Disputes (1981).

Takis Sinopoulos, influenced by existentialism, made big impression with his first collections, such as Verge (1951) and The Meeting with Max (1956). Deathfeast (1970) is another famed work of his. Sinopoulos' verse depicts desolate individual and collective landscapes which reflect the painful and far-reaching consequences of World War II and the Civil War.

Miltos Sachtouris and Nanos Valaoritis belong to the second wave of Greek Surrealism. Sachtouris, known for The Forgotten (1945), The Walk (1960), and Vessel (1971), wrote poetry that is simultaneously compassionate and macabre. Valaoritis (The Punishment of the Magi - 1947, Breeding Ground for Germs - 1977) frequently restored older forms and made use of surrealistic modes to achieve poetic self-transcendence. Poet and art historian Eleni Vakalo, who has been described as "one of the most respectable figures of post-war intellectual life", also incorporated elements of Surrealism. She is known for Theme and Variations (1945), Recollections from a Nightmarish City (1948), and Genealogy (1972).

Nikos Karouzos has been labeled by some as a philosophical poet, while others consider him more of a religious one. Indeed, he began his poetic career with strongly Christian verse, which he gradually abandoned. His collections include The Return of Christ (1953) and Neolithic Nocturne in Kronstadt (1987).

Zoe Karelli first appeared on the literary scene in 1935 with a reflective essay published in the noted literary journal "Third Eye". Her work has a special place in the poetry written between the wars and by the Generation of the Thirties, as well as in the output of the post-war era. She is best known for her 1957 poem – Woman Man – which is difficult to translate because of her use of the feminine article with the Greek word for “mankind”. Karelli is viewed as a pioneer feminist in Greece. She published twelve collections of poetry (1940-1973), five plays -- two of which were produced on stage -- more than 100 essays and studies, as well as translations, particularly works by T.S. Eliot. Karelli was the first woman of letters to be elected to the Academy of Athens in 1982, and received the coveted Ouranis Award for her complete works in 1978.

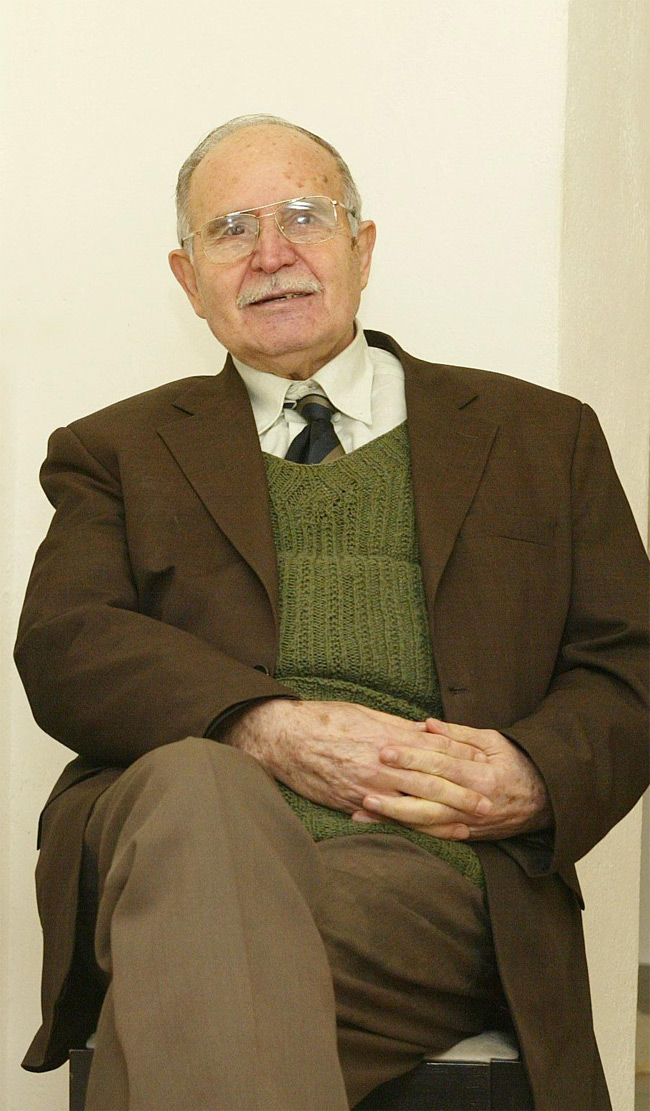
Dinos Christianopoulos

During the '50s and '60s, poetry began to diversify. Many poets focused upon the social pathology and economic recession of the post-war period, reflecting the massive urbanization that took place during the '60s, while others turned to erotic poetry. This new group, also known as the second post-war generation, is comprised by poets born after 1929; their distinction with the previous generation is based solely on the fact that, due to their young age, they weren't active participants of the Resistance or the Civil War.

Kiki Dimoula is recognised as one of the greatest female poets of modern Greece. Her work drew thematically on the endless trials of everyday life, and was characterised by an immediate and intense confessional language. Her best known collections are Darkness of Hell (1956), In Absentia (1958), The Bit of the World (1971), and The Last Body (1981).

Dinos Christianopoulos was a daring poet, not deterred by prudery of his time. He is best known for his erotic poetry of homosexual tones, found in collections such as Defenceless Sorrow (1960) and The Body and the Woodworm (1964). However, he also wrote scathing poems dealing with societal themes (The Cross-Eyed Man - 1967).

Other poets belonging to the second post-war generation are Nikos-Alexis Aslanoglou, Vyron Leontaris, Tassos Porfyris, Thomas Gorpas, Zefi Daraki, Markos Meskos, and Anestis Evangelou.

=== Prose ===
Post-war prose is perhaps of greater diversity than the verse of the period. Writers were markedly different from their predecessors; having grown up during the Occupation, the Resistance and the Civil War they clashed with the establishment and were intensely critical of every kind of authority. Moreover, they revived short story and tried out grafting modernist techniques, including the internal monologue, stream-of-consciousness, self-referentiality and intertextuality, upon more traditional forms of narrative.

In the immediate post-war period, some of the most noteworthy literary personalities are women, such as Margarita Liberaki and Tatiana Gritsi-Milliex. Liberaki is chiefly known for her novel Three Summers (1946). It is considered one of the most important post-war prose texts and has been described as being "ahead of its time." Her work in theatre is also of considerable merit. Gritsi-Milliex (Theseon Square - 1947, On Street of the Angels - 1949, In the First Person - 1958) had a long career with strong inclination to experimentation.

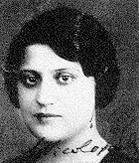
Dido Sotiriou

Lili Zografou appeared in that period too, but her better-known books (Occupation: Prostitute - 1978, Love was one day late - 1994) were published much later. Overall, her work is noted for its non-conformist and feminist content.

A later example is Dido Sotiriou, one of the greatest female prose writers of modern Greece. She lived a turmoiled life, much of which is reflected on fer writings. Her novels have received wide acclaim and particularly Farewell Anatolia (1962), about the Smyrna Catastrophe, is regarded as a landmark of modern Greek literature. She also wrote The Dead are Waiting (1959) and Commandment (1976).

In 1946, The Broad River, a book on the Greco-Italian War, by Giannis Beratis was published. Written in a journal-like way, it signalled a trend of similar novels, such as Pyramid 67 (1950) by Renos Apostolidis, The Siege (1953) by Alexandros Kotzias and The Grooves of the Millstone (1955) by Nikos Kasdaglis.

Dimitris Chatzis made his debut with the novel The Fire (1946), and later on he focused mainly on short stories, as in The End of our Small Town (1960). His overall work is limited, but is praised for its simplicity and its "poetic" realism.

Although he was not the first to be engaged with crime fiction, Yannis Maris is acknowledged as the father of the genre in Greek. He wrote a large number of novels, of which the best-known are Crime in Kolonaki (1953), Crime at the Backstage (1954), The Death of Timotheos Konstas (1961), and Vertigo (1968).

Spyros Plaskovitis established himself both at home and abroad with The Dam (1960), an allegorical novel about the fears and insecurities of the post-war individual. His short stories collections, such as The Storm and the Lamp (1955) and Barbed Wire (1974), are also notable.

Antonis Samarakis is one of the most widely translated of contemporary Greek authors. He quickly established himself with his first books, Wanted: Hope (1954) and Danger Signal (1959). However, his most famous work is The Flaw (1966), one of the most important Greek books about totalitarianism. His works touch on a range of current issues in Greek political and social life, exposing the violence and tyranny of the modern state.

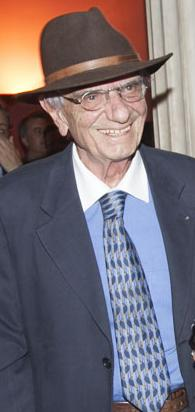
Vassilis Vassilikos

Vassilis Vassilikos caused a sensation with his novella The Narration of Jason (1953). Since then, he has embraced practically every type of literary genre, establishing himself as one of the most productive, popular and widely translated Greek writers. His most famous work is the political thriller Z (1966), followed by The Plant, the Well, the Angel (1961), The Photographs (1964), and The Monarch (1970).

During the 60's appeared a crop of writers of great impact. While the events of the Occupation, the Resistance and the Civil War remained one of the basic elements of their writing, they expansed their thematology to various societal subjects of the time. Their eagerness to experiment in style was one of their main traits.

Stratis Tsirkas is perhaps the most outstanding prose writer of post-war Greece. He owns his fame to the trilogy Drifting Cities (The Club - 1961, Ariagni - 1962, The Bat - 1965), which has been said that it propelled modern Greek novel to a "more advanced level." It is exalted not only for its monumental length, but also for introducing the Greek readership to entirely new techniques of narration. His other books include Noureddine Bomba (1957) and The Lost Spring (1976).

Giorgos Ioannou began his career as a poet, but he is better-known as a short story writer. His collections, most notably Out of Self-Respect (1964), The Sarcophagus (1971) and Our Blood (1978), are known for their unusual mixture of self-analysis and intimate realism and have earned him a comparison with James Joyce.

Despite his very small body of work, Costas Taktsis is a prominent figure, due to The Third Wedding (1962), a novel about the Greek petit bourgeoisie, widely considered a masterpiece of modern Greek literature. He also published Small Change (1972), a collection of short stories.

Menis Koumantareas was one of the most versatile and productive writers of his generation. He wrote novels and short stories with equal success. His main literary concern was to depict the claustrophobic influence of social environment upon individuals. Koumandareas' best-known works include The Pin-ball Machines (1962), The Glass Factory (1975), Mrs Koula (1978), and The Handsome Captain (1982).

Thanassis Valtinos is one of the most influential writers of his generation. He dealt with the atrocities of the Civil War and explored the issue of post-war immigration, setting new standards for prose writing with his innovative style. The Book of the Days of Andreas Kordopatis (1972), Descent of the Nine (1978), and Data from the Decade of the Sixties (1989) are some of his best known books.

The 60's was also a time when children's and adolescents' literature began to flourish. Especially Wildcat under Glass (1963) by Alki Zei is considered a classic work of the field. Zei's other books include Petros' War (1971) and Achilles’ Fiancée (1987). Another influential children's author is Georges Sari, best known for The Treasure of Vaghia (1969) and Ninette (1993).

=== Theatre ===
The years following World War II were a period of prosperity for theatre. Dramatic plays often depicted the sad aspects of a cheerless life, the suffering and passions of simple, poor folk within a suffocating routine, or presented their own poetic idioms, creating extraordinary and unrealistic worlds. At the same time, comic plays proved extremely popular and many of them were adapted to equally successful films.

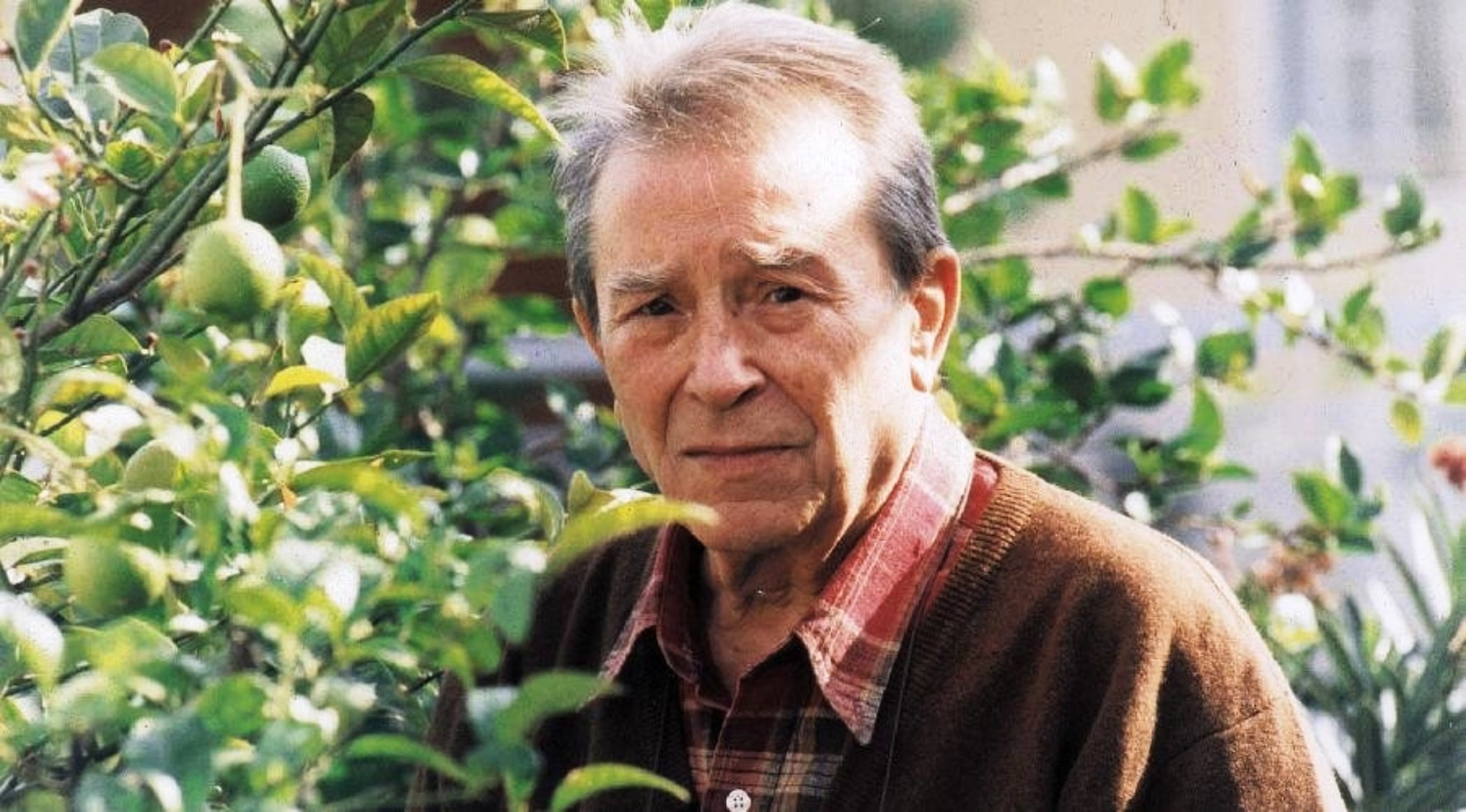
Iakovos Kampanellis

Iakovos Kampanellis was a central personality of this renewal. The success of his early plays, especially The Courtyard of Miracles (1957), blazed new trails for Greek playwrights of the time. He became involved in various theatrical styles and his plays display significant divergences between various periods. Kampanellis is also known for the play Our Great Circus (1972) and the novel Mauthausen (1963).

Dimitris Psathas was one of the leading humorists of post-war Greece. He initially gained fame with his novel Madam Shoushou (1941), but he is best remembered for his large quantity of plays, that aptly commented on various issues of his day. These include Von Dimitrakis (1947), Looking for a Liar (1953), and Wake up Vasilis (1965).

Loula Anagnostaki is one of the most powerful dramatist of this era, known for developing socialist and feminist themes in an alienated way. Perhaps her best-known work is the Trilogy of the City (1965), comprised by Overnight Stay, The City, and The Parade.

Other important playwrights of this period are Kostas Mourselas (Men and Horses - 1959, Oh, what a World, Dad! - 1972), who adopted elements from the theatre of the absurd, Dimitris Kechaidis (The Fair - 1964, Laurels and Oleanders - 1979), known for combining realism with humour, and Vassilis Ziogas (Antigone's Matchmaking - 1958, The Comedy of the Fly - 1967), known for his surrealist imagery.

== Greek Junta and afterwards ==
Mid-20th century was marked by the Regime of the Colonels, which governed the country from 1967 to 1974. Cultural life was severely affected: books were subject to censorship or prohibition and many writers (e.g. Yannis Ritsos, Elli Alexiou) were exiled or placed in detention. Despite persecutions, numerous writers opposed the regime through their art. One of the most apparent examples is Eighteen Texts (1970), an anti-dictatorship statement signed by 18 well-known authors, including Giorgos Seferis, Takis Sinopoulos, Stratis Tsirkas, Menis Koumandareas, Rodis Kanakaris-Roufos, and Manolis Anagnostakis.

The term "Generation of the '70s" is generally used to describe poets who published their first book during the dictatorship, although there are many exceptions. They were also dubbed the "third post-war generation" and "generation of contention", since they tried to impeach the political and societal alienation of the dictatorship and, later on, of the early Metapolitefsi. Integrating influences from various foreign sources, such as the radical political climate of May 1968 in France or the artistic experiments of Gruppo 63 in Italy, they acted as importers of trends from Europe and America. Frivolous language, irony and humour were prominent components of their poetry.

Lefteris Poulios is considered a leading figure of this generation. His poetry, furious and obscene, echoes the Beat movement and inveighs against consumerism and commercialization. Some of his most powerful poems are found in his early collections, such as Poetry (1969) and Poetry 2 (1973).

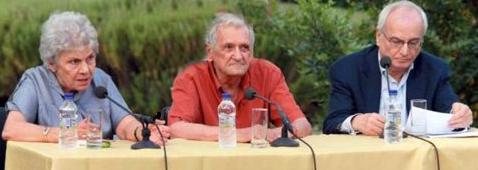
From left to right: Kiki Dimoula, Titos Patrikios, Nasos Vagenas

Nasos Vagenas writes predominantly about love, death, history/politics, and poetry itself, in verses that are noted for their aphoristic language, subtle innuendos and irony. His collections include Pedion Areos (1974), Biography (1978), and Roxana's Knees (1981).

Jenny Mastoraki (Tolls - 1972, Kin - 1978, Tales of the Deep - 1983) wrote poetry full of irony and bitterness, standing out for its musicality and rich syntax. Thematically, she deals with subjects such as feminism, censorship and authority.

Katerina Anghelaki-Rooke is one of the most prominent poets of this generation (Note: Anghelaki-Rooke had made her debut earlier, but she is often considered part of this group.) and the only one that ventured into longer compositions. She excelled in erotic poetry that spoke frankly about passion and its pain. Perhaps her most notable collections are Wolves and Clouds (1963), Magdalene, the Great Mammal (1974), The Suitors (1984), and The Anorexia of Existence (2011).

Katerina Gogou (Three Clicks Left - 1978, Idionymo - 1980), Manolis Pratikakis (Libido - 1978, The Water - 2003), Argyris Chionis (Attempts of Light - 1966, Shapes of Absence - 1973), Yannis Kondos (Circular Route - 1970, The Chronometre - 1972), Michalis Ganas (Unseated Dinner - 1978, Glass Ioannina - 1989), Maria Laina (Coming of Age - 1968, Hers - 1985), Vassilis Steriadis (Mr. Ivo - 1970, The Private Airplane - 1971), and Antonis Fostieris (The Great Trip - 1971, Precious Oblivion - 2003) are also notable members of the '70s Generation.

Contrastingly to poetry, prose was rather scarce during the years of the dictatorship, even though many already established writers saw their books published. By extension, most of the leading writers of the '70s appeared in 1974 or afterwards. Their works use a variety of older and new means of expression and provide apt notion of the present and the past time. Naturally, they had not yet cut themselves off from politics, but for most of them politics was now simply a starting point to deal with more modern themes such as the struggle between the personal and the collective within a constantly changing social universe.

Ilias Papadimitrakopoulos, Dimitris Nollas, Antonis Sourounis, Margarita Karapanou, and Maro Douka stand as some of the most significant prose writers that established themselves during the '70s. Papadimitrakopoulos is primarily known for his short stories, especially those in Toothpaste with Chlorophyll (1973). Nollas (The Fairy of Athens - 1974, Our Best Years - 1984, The Tomb near the Sea - 1992) is known for his perceptive portrayal of the Greek society over the years. Sourounis (The Teammates - 1977, The Dance of the Roses - 1994, Gus the Gangster - 2000) delved into the world of the gastarbeiter by combining humour with bitterness. Margarita Karapanou is best-known for Kassandra and the Wolf (1976), a bildungsroman that deals with authoritarianism and feminism. Maro Douka (Fool's Gold - 1979, The Floating City - 1983) is applauded for her prose clarity and the insightful depiction of the changes of Greek society during the past decades.

A unique case of a writer who made his debut during the dictatorship, is Eugene Trivizas, who has been described as the most famous Greek storyteller and one of the most important authors of children's literature. His earliest stories are The Pirates of the Chimney and The Bull that played the Bagpipes, both published around 1968 at children's magazine. Other important work by Trivizas includes The Snowman and the Girl (1983), The Three Little Wolves and the Big Bad Pig (1993), The Last Black Cat (2001), and the plays The Dream of the Scarecrow (1987) and The Magical Pillows (1993). In 2006, Trivizas was a finalist for the international Hans Christian Andersen Award.

== From 1980 to 1999 ==
The '80s saw a remarkable rise of prose. Readers and publishers massively turned to it and by the end of the decade it had taken over from poetry, traditionally the most prestigious literary form in Greece. Writers left behind politics and chose private life as the core of their books, while embarking on an intensive pursuit of new forms and genres. Progressively, this trend intensified and by the '90s, Greek prose was a colorful mosaic, in both thematology and means of expression. Minimalism, debunkment, parody, and mixing of different storytelling genres are common elements. Compared to previous decades, from the '80s onwards prose has largely been dominated by female authors.

Giannis Xanthoulis is one of the most popular writers that debuted in the '80s, having sold more than 1,5 million copies. His books, including The Great Death (1981), The Dead Liqueur (1987), and The Christmas Tango (2003), are known for the use of everyday language and a feeling of sexual emancipation.

Eugenia Fakinou, with Astradeni (1982) and The Seventh Garment (1983), contributed to the modern Greek novel as a sophisticated reinspection of history. Her other books include Who Killed Moby Dick? (2001) and Garden Ambitions (2007).

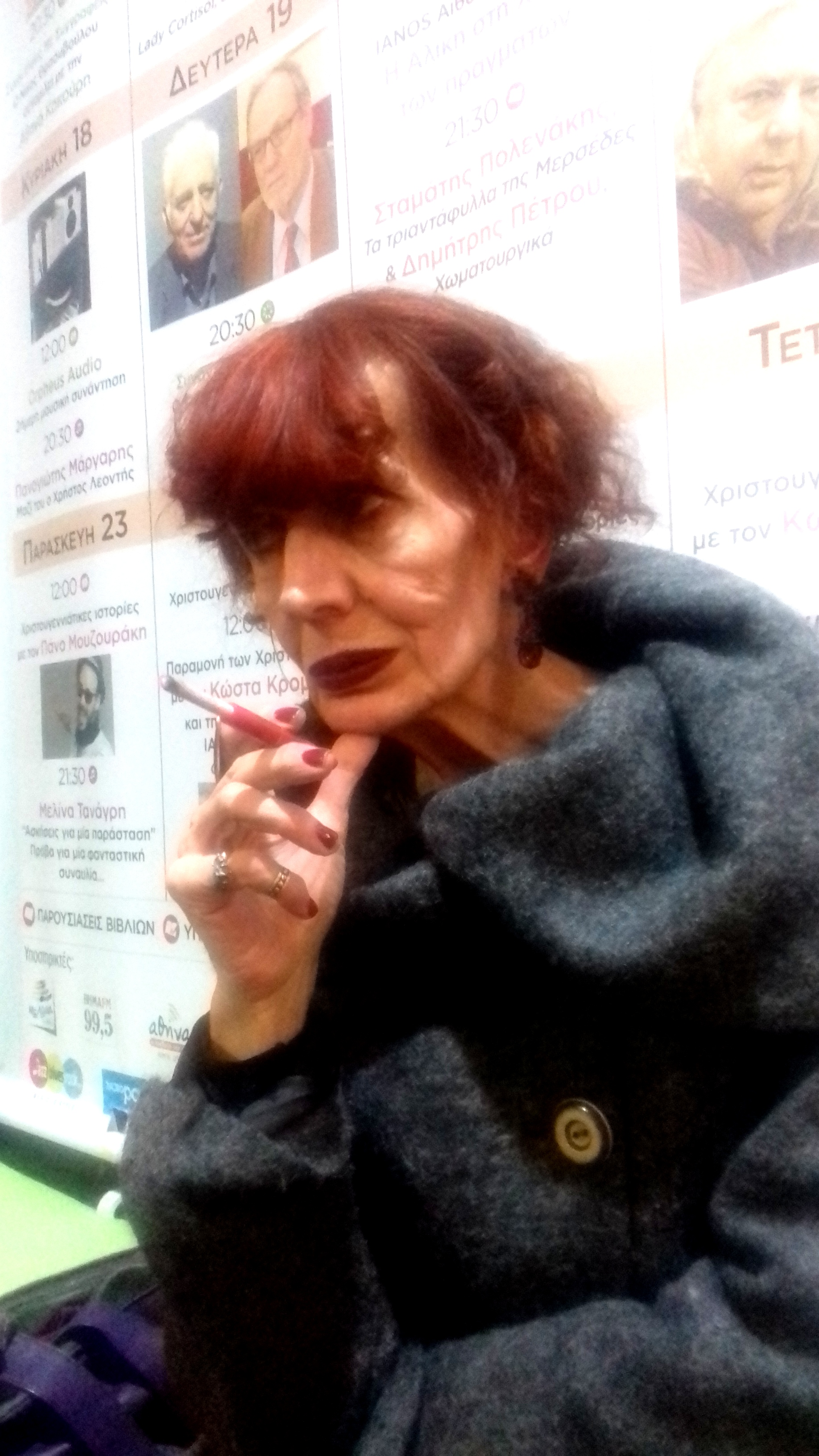
Zyranna Zateli

Zyranna Zateli is widely considered one of the most exciting Greek authors writing today. She won critics and readers alike with the short-story collection Last Year's Fiancée (1984), but her most famous work is the novel At Twilight they Return (1993), which falls under the genre of magical realism.

Andreas Mitsou appeared in early '80s and today stands as a productive and much-awarded writer of short stories and novels. He is perhaps best-known for The Feeble Lies of Orestes Halkiopoulos (1995), Wasps (2001), and Mister Episkopakis (2007).

Ersi Sotiropoulou is regarded as one of the pioneers of this generation, mostly thanks to her novel The Prank (1982). Today, she is probably best-known for Zigzag through the Bitter Orange Trees (1999), which was successful both at home and abroad. Her other books include Eva (2009) and What's left of the Night (2015).

Rhea Galanaki, who had already made her debut as a poet under the dictatorship, is one of contemporary Greece's most discussed novelists. Her books, particularly The Life of Ismail Ferik Pasha (1989) and Eleni, or, Nobody (1998), transformed the genre of historical novel, by emphasizing the psychology of the characters. Her work has been widely translated.

Christos Chomenidis debuted with The Wise Child (1993) and quickly established himself thanks to his subversive style of writing and wide array of settings and themes. His novel Niki (2014), awarded with European Book Prize, is already recognized as a high achievement of contemporary Greek literature.

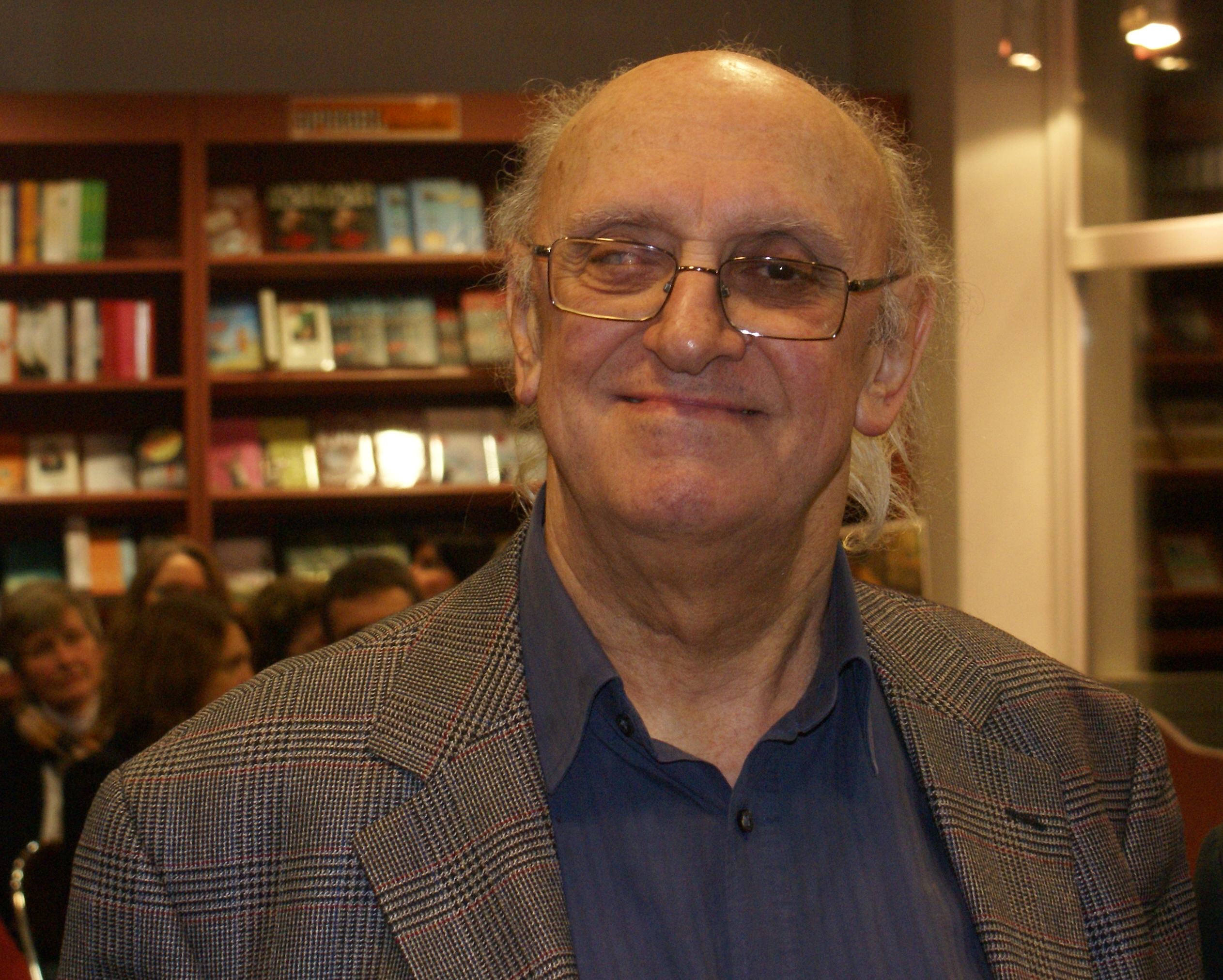
Petros Markaris

Petros Markaris made his literary debut in 1995 with Late-Night News, and has since become a leading writer of detective novels. Many of his books, including Zone Defense (1998) and Che committed Suicide (2003), have been translated in numerous foreign languages.

Amanda Michalopoulou received much attention for her early work, most notably Wishbone (1996), and has since become one of the most prominent voices in contemporary Greek literature. Her best known books, including Baroque (2018) and Her Metamorphosis (2022), explore female experience, human relationships, and the spiritual dimension.

Ioanna Karystiani is one of the most notable writers that appeared during the '90s, establishing herself with the novels Little England (1997) and Suit on Soil (2000). Her work is defined by rare consistency; her books Sacks (2010) and Time Pensive (2011) are considered among the best of the decade of 2010.

Chrysa Dimoulidou is one of the best-selling Greek writers, since her books have sold around 2 million copies. However, they are panned by the critics and have been called "light literature". Dimoulidou made her debut in 1997 with Roses do not always smell and has since led a trend of various successful female writers of similar style. Among her other books are God's Tears (2005), The Crossroad of Souls (2009), and The Cellar of Shame (2014).

Other critically acclaimed and/or commercially successful books from the '80s and '90s are History (1982) by Giorgis Giatromanolakis, Fantastic Adventure (1985) by Alexandros Kotzias, The Crowd (1985-1986) by Andreas Franghias, The Great Square (1987) and The Endless Writing of Blood (1997) by Nikos Bakolas, Red Dyed Hair by Kostas Mourselas (1989), The Daughter (1990) by Pavlos Matesis, Saturday Night at the Edge of the City (1996) by Soti Triantafyllou, The Slapfish (1997) by Lenos Christidis, and The Search (1998) by Nikos Themelis.

The poets that appeared in the '80s have been collectively named the "generation of the private vision", as their poetry is characterized by heavy introversion. These include Charis Vlavianos, Giorgos Blanas, Nikos Davvetas, Ilias Lagios, Sotiris Trivizas, Thanasis Chatzopoulos, and Maria Koursi. They detached themselves from their immediate predecessors and developed poetics closer to older generations. Free verse was dominant, leading to a new kind of formalism. Moreover, they did not share interest in the same themes, apart from classic topics such as death and love. Politics was underepresented, partly due to the complacency born after the 1981 parliamentary elections, when PASOK formed Greece's first progressive government. This generation as a whole has been unfavourably compared to previous generations, but many of its members have nevertheless been praised for achieving early maturity.

The "decline" of poetry continued in the '90s. Only a few poets appeared during that decade and most of them are unknown to the wide readership. Publishing companies mainly preferred either prose books, which were more profitable, or, in some cases, works from already famous poets. In general, poets of this generation display a wide variety of styles and carried on trends that appeared in the '80s.

== Notable works ==
- Erofili (c.1600), drama by Georgios Chortatzis (noted by Palamas as the first work of modern Greek theatre)
- Erotokritos (c.1600), romance by Vitsentzos Kornaros
- Thourios, or War Hymn (1797) by Rigas Feraios
- Hymn to Liberty (1823) by Dionysios Solomos
- Lyrika/Lyrics (1826) by Andreas Kalvos
- The Free Besieged (1826–1844) by Dionysios Solomos
- The Exile of 1831 (1831), novel by Alexandros Soutsos
- Leander (1834), by Panagiotis Soutsos
- The Orphan of Chios, or the Triumph of Virtue (1839), novel by Iakovos Pitsipios
- The Man of Many Sufferings (1839), picaresque novel by Grigorios Palaiologos
- Xouth the Αpe (1848), novel by Iakovos Pitsipios
- Aponimonevmata (Memoirs) (written between 1829-1850, published 1907) by Yannis Makriyannis
- History of the Hellenic Nation (1860-1877) by Constantine Paparrigopoulos
- The Papess Joanne (1866), novel by Emmanuel Rhoides
- Military life in Greece (1870) by Charilaos Dimopoulos
- History of Modern Greek Literature (1877) by Alexandros Rizos Rangavis
- Loukis Laras (1879), novel by Demetrius Vikelas
- My Mother's Sin (1883), novel by Georgios Vizyinos
- The Only Journey of His Life (1884), novel by Georgios Vizyinos
- Idou o anthropos (1886), by Andreas Laskaratos
- My Journey (1888) by Ioannis Psycharis, about the Greek language question
- The Murderess (1903), novel by Alexandros Papadiamantis
- Twelve Lays of the Gypsy (1907) by Kostis Palamas
- The Light-Shadowed (1909), poetry collection by Angelos Sikelianos
- The King's Flute (1910) by Kostis Palamas
- The Ghost (1914), novel by Grigorios Xenopoulos
- Pedro Cazas (1920), novella by Photis Kontoglou
- Nepenthe (1921), poetry collection by Kostas Karyotakis
- Life in the Tomb (1923) by Stratis Myrivilis
- Number 31328 (1926), novel by Elias Venezis
- Elegies and Satires (1927), poetry collection by Kostas Karyotakis
- Strophe (1931), poetry collection by Giorgos Seferis
- Marabu (1933), poetry collection by Nikos Kavvadias
- Ypsikaminos (1935), surrealist collection by Andreas Embeirikos
- Epitafios (1936) by Yiannis Ritsos (melodized by Mikis Theodorakis)
- Galene (Tranquility) (1937), novel by Elias Venezis
- Secrets of the Swamp (1937) by Penelope Delta
- Madame Sousou (1941) by Dimitris Psathas
- Aeoliki Gi (Aeolian Earth) (1943), novel by Elias Venezis
- Amorgos (1943), poem by Nikos Gatsos
- Princess Isabeau (1945), novel by Angelos Terzakis
- Zorba the Greek (1946), novel by Nikos Kazantzakis
- Fog (1947), poetry collection by Nikos Kavvadias
- Pyramid 67 (1950), novel by Renos Apostolidis
- God's Pauper: Saint Francis of Assisi (1953), by Nikos Kazantzakis
- The Great Chimera (1953), novel by M. Karagatsis
- Crime in Kolonaki (1953) by Yannis Maris
- The Last Temptation of Christ (1953), novel by Nikos Kazantzakis
- Captain Michalis (1953), novel by Nikos Kazantzakis
- Romiosini (1954) by Yiannis Ritsos (melodized by Mikis Theodorakis)
- Christ Recrucified (1954), novel by Nikos Kazantzakis
- A Child Counting the Stars (1956), novel by Menelaos Lountemis
- To Axion Esti (1959), poetry collection by Odysseas Elytis (melodized by Mikis Theodorakis)
- Report to Greco (1961), novel by Nikos Kazantzakis
- The Third Wedding (1962) by Costas Taktsis
- Bloody Earth (1962), novel by Dido Sotiriou
- The Tiger in the Shop Window (a.k.a. Wildcat Under Glass) (1963), novel by Alki Zei
- The 10 (1964), unfinished novel by M. Karagatsis
- Drifting Cities: The Club, Ariagni, The Bat (trilogy, published between 1961-1965) by Stratis Tsirkas
- The Flaw (1965) by Antonis Samarakis
- Oktana (written 1958-1965, published 1980), surrealist collection by Andreas Embirikos
- History of the European Spirit (1966) by Panagiotis Kanellopoulos
- Z (1966) by Vassilis Vassilikos
- The A2 (1968), novella by Renos Apostolidis
- The Treasure of Vaghia (1969) by Georges Sari
- The Great Eastern (standardized c. 1970, published in eight volumes 1990–1992) by Andreas Embirikos
- Eighteen Short Songs of the Bitter Motherland (1973), poetry collection by Yiannis Ritsos (melodized by Mikis Theodorakis)
- Maria Nefeli (1978), poetry collection by Odysseas Elytis
- Three Clicks Left (1978), poetry collection by Katerina Gogou
- O Lousios (1980) by Nikos Chouliaras
- My dear Sophia (1985) by Freddy Germanos
- The Heart of the Beast (1987) by Petros Tatsopoulos
- Edge of Night (1994) by Thanos Alexandris
- The Jasmine Island (1997) by Ioanna Karystiani

=== Theatrical plays ===
- Achilleus or Death of Patroclus (1805) by Athanasios Christopoulos
- Babylonia (1836), comedy by Dimitris Vyzantios
- The Wedding of Koutroulis (1845), comedy by Alexandros Rizos Rangavis
- Maria Doxapatri (1853) by Demetrios Bernardakis
- Vasilikos (1859) by Antonios Matesis
- The secret of countess Valerena (1904) by Gregorios Xenopoulos
- Stella Violanti (1909) by Gregorios Xenopoulos
- Protomastoras (1910) by Nikos Kazantzakis (performed also as opera by Manolis Kalomoiris)
- Long Live Messolonghi (1927) by Vasilis Rotas
- Madam Sousou (1942), comedy by Dimitris Psathas
- Our Great Circus (1972) by Iakovos Kambanellis

== Gallery ==
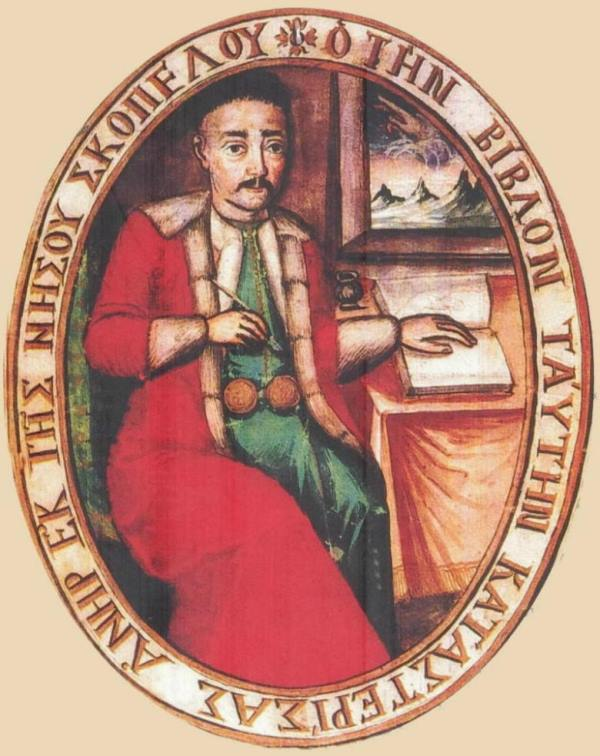
Kaisarios Dapontes

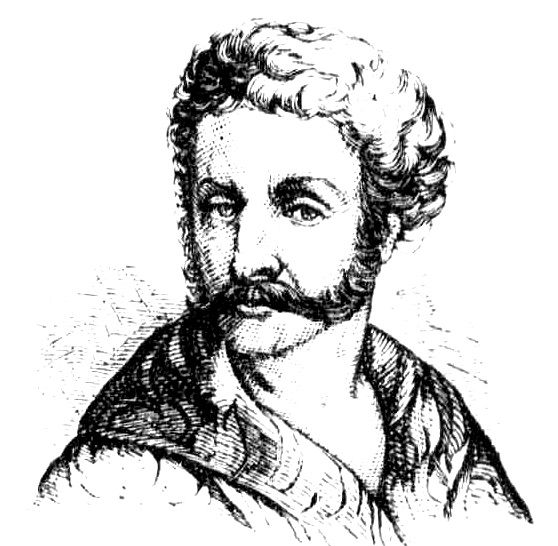
Athanasios Christopoulos

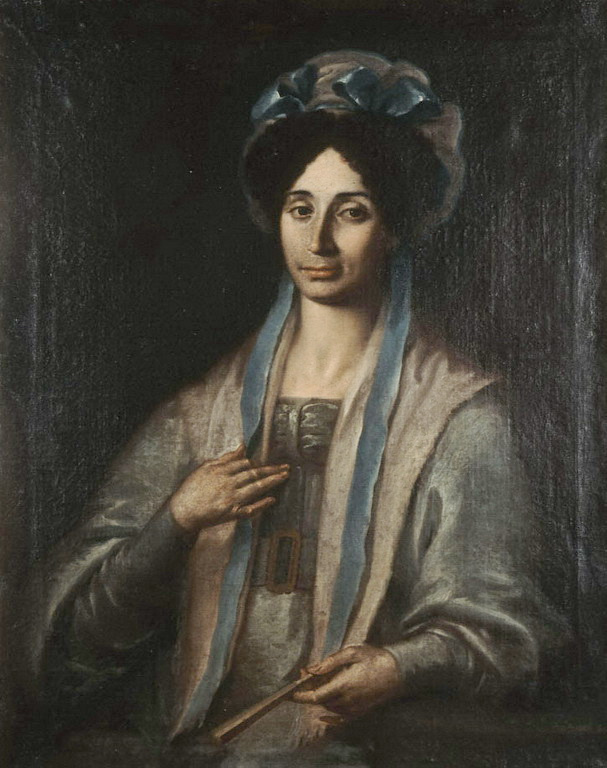
Elizabeth Moutzan-Martinegou

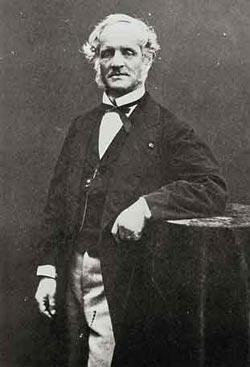
Alexandros Rizos Rangavis

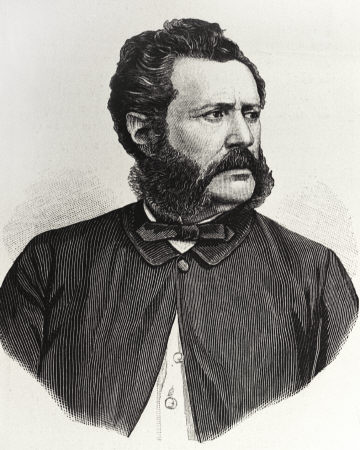
Aristotelis Valaoritis

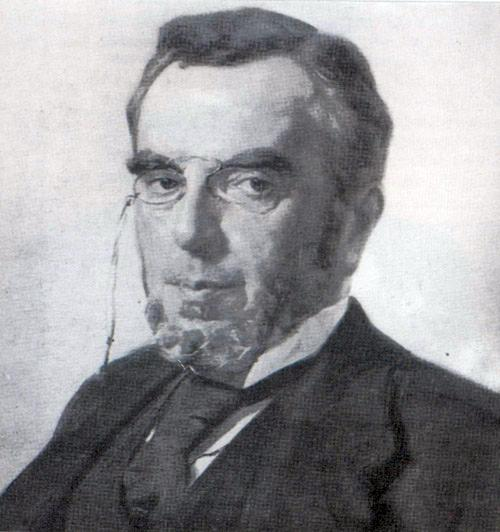
Demetrios Vikelas

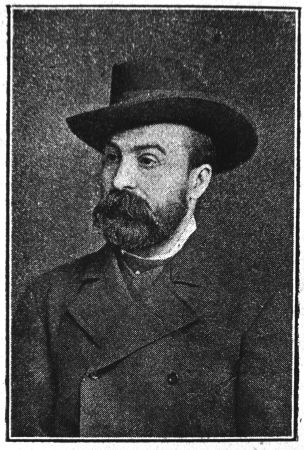
Georgios Vizyinos

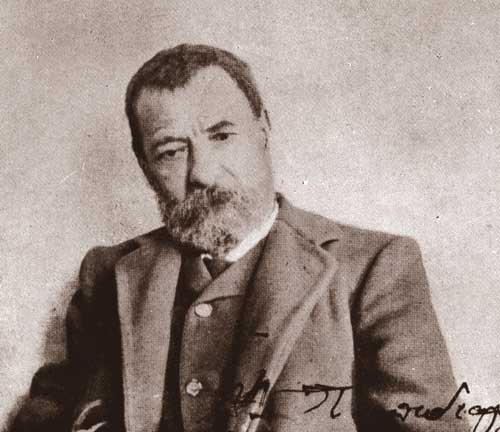
Alexandros Papadiamantis

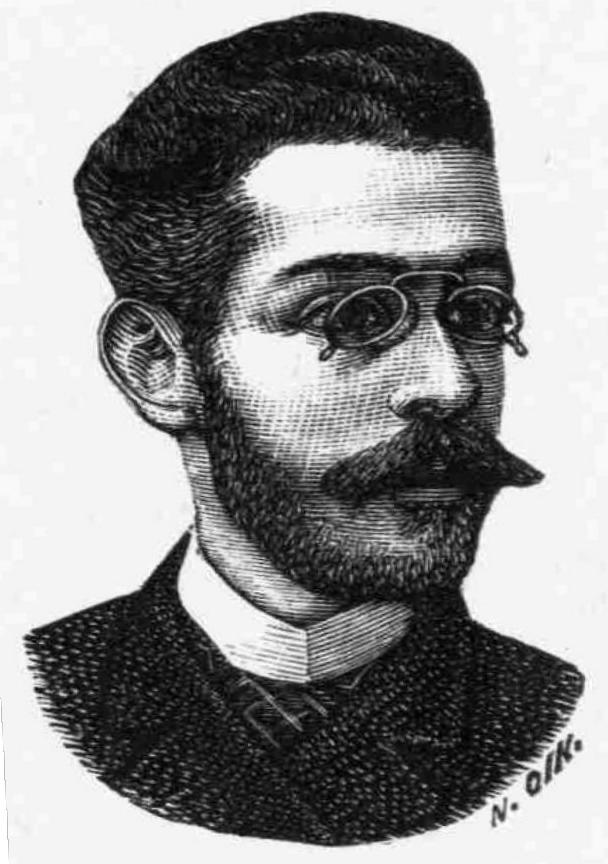
Georgios Drossinis

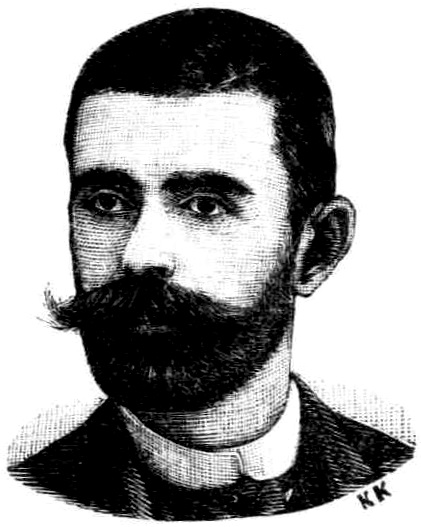
Kostis Palamas

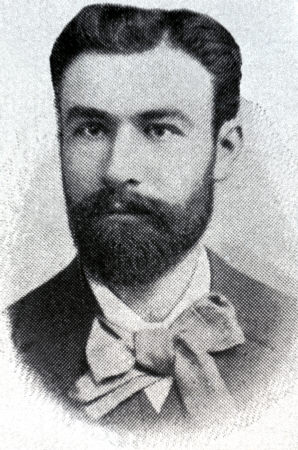
Andreas Karkavitsas

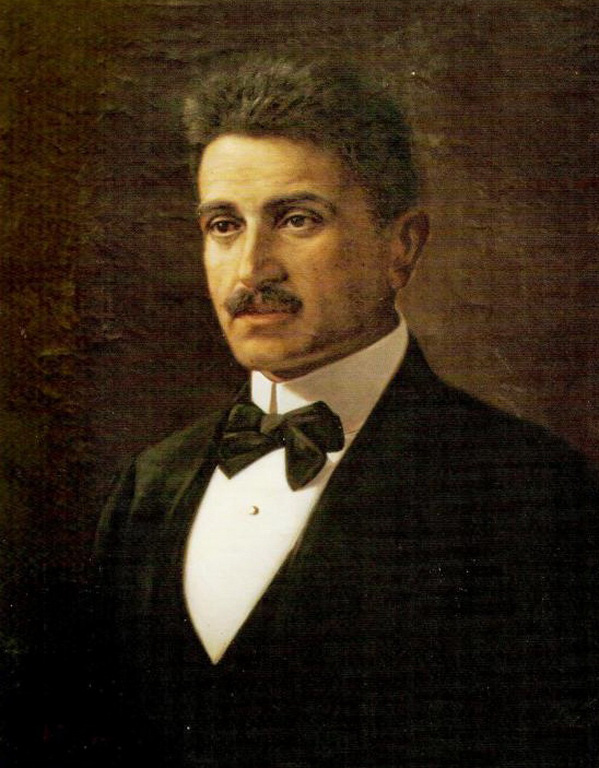
Konstantinos Theotokis

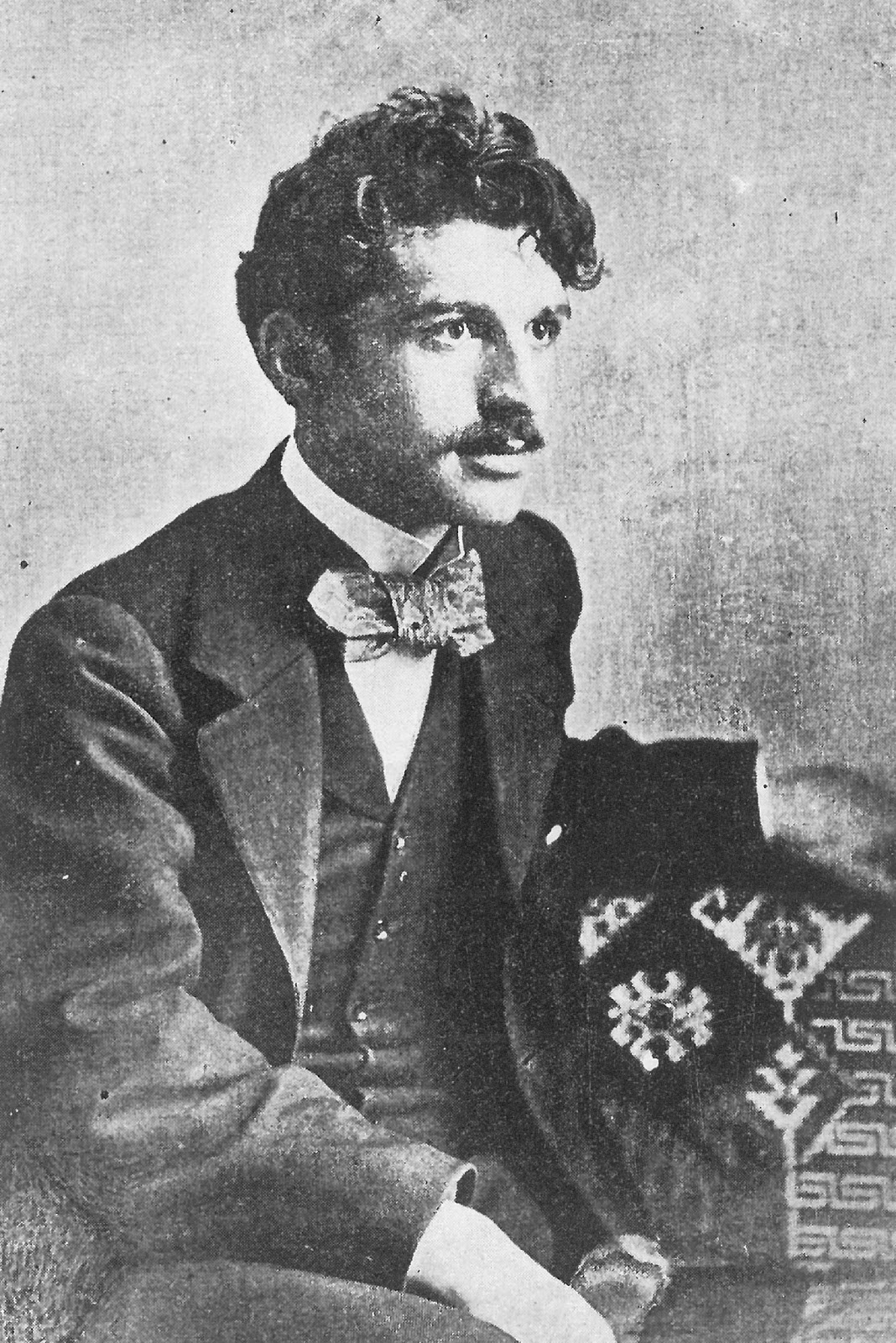
Zacharias Papantoniou

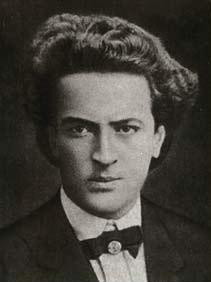
Angelos Sikelianos

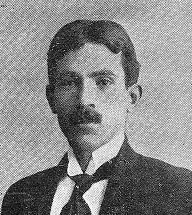
Kostas Varnalis

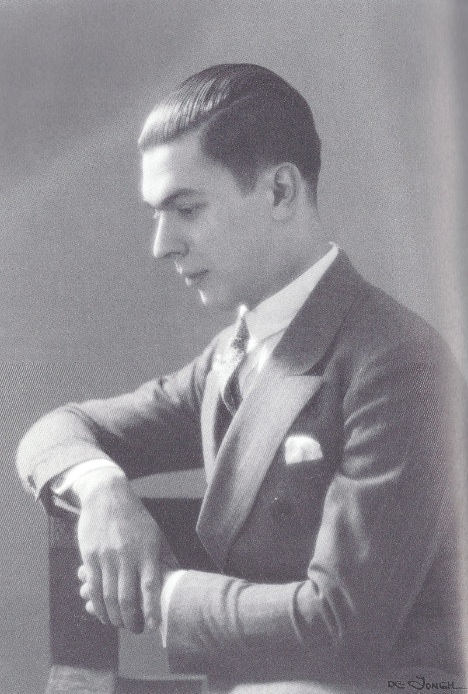
Andreas Embeirikos

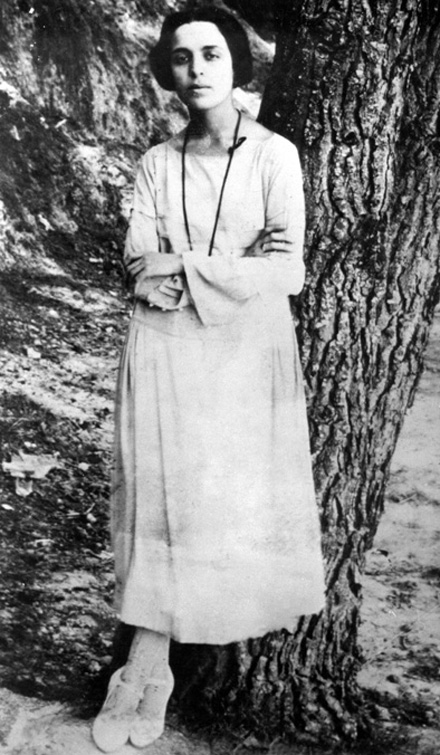
Maria Polydouri

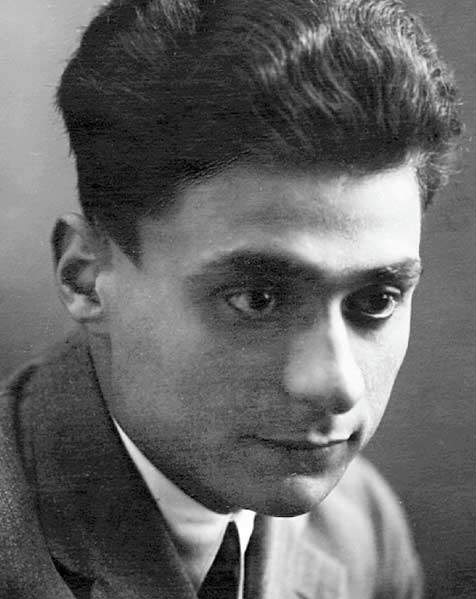
Elias Venezis

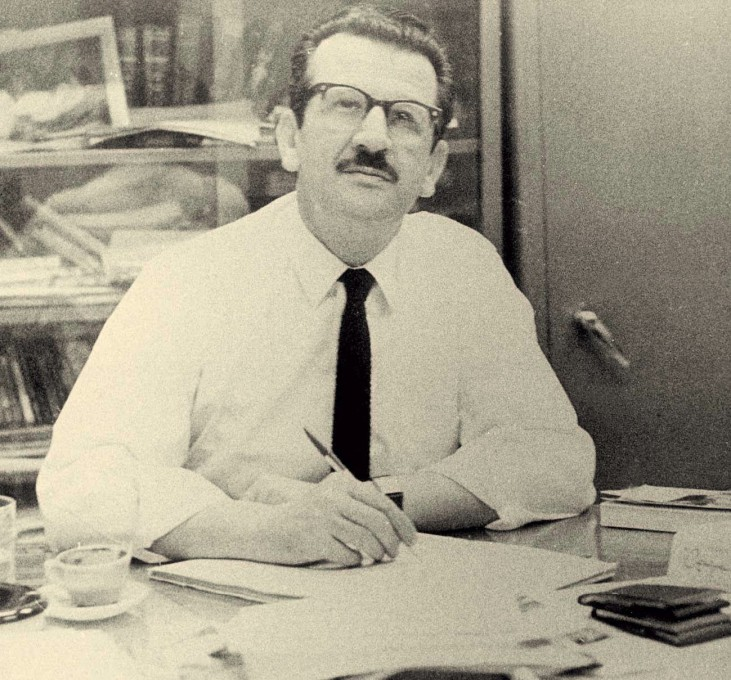
Yannis Maris

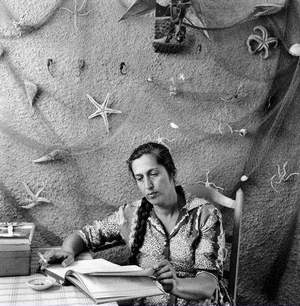
Eleni Vakalo

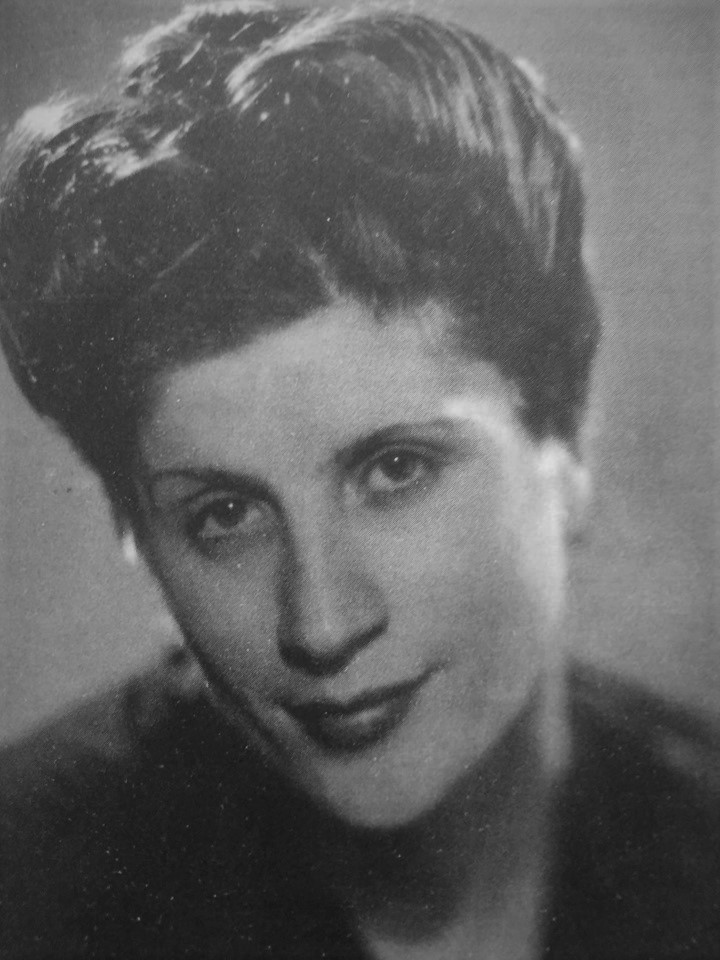
Lili Zografou

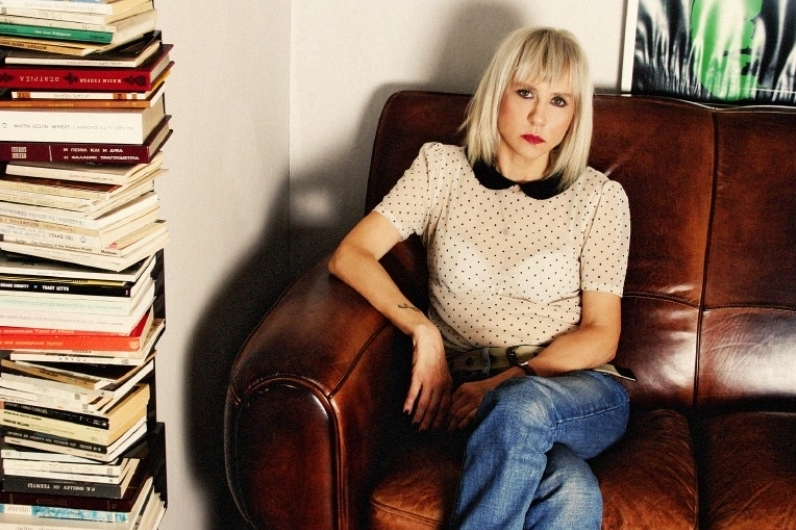
Soti Triantafyllou

== See also ==
- Greek literature
- Cretan literature
- First Athenian School
- Heptanese School (literature)
- New Athenian School
- List of Greek writers
- List of Greek poets

== Bibliography ==
- Alexiou, Margaret (2002). After Antiquity: Greek Language, Myth, and Metaphor. Ithaca, NY: Cornell University Press. ISBN 9780801433016.
- Andreou, Evangelos (2010). Elements of Life - Modern Greek Literature (in Greek). Athens, Greece: European Art Center. ISBN 978-960-99566-1-1.
- Argyriou, Alexandros (2002). History of Greek Literature and its assessment in the Interwar Years (1918-1940) (in Greek). Vol. I. Athens, Greece: Kastaniotis. ISBN 960-03-3321-1.
- Beaton, Roderick (1996a). The Medieval Greek Romance (2nd ed.). London, UK: Routledge. ISBN 0-415-12032-2.
- Beaton, Roderick (1996b). An Introduction to Modern Greek Literature (in Greek). Athens, Greece: Nefeli. ISBN 960-211-292-1.
- Beaton, Roderick (2009). Folk Poetry of Modern Greece. Cambridge, UK: Cambridge University Press. ISBN 9780511554131.
- Beaton, Roderick; Ricks, David, eds. (2009). The Making of Modern Greece: Nationalism, Romanticism, and the Uses of the Past (1797–1896). Farnham, UK: Ashgate. ISBN 978-0-7546-9339-0.
- Dimaras, K.T. (1989). Modern Greek Enlightenment (in Greek) (5th ed.). Athens, Greece: Ermis.
- Dimaras, K.T. (2000). A History of Modern Greek Literature (in Greek). Athens, Greece: Gnosi. ISBN 960-235-638-3.
- Evangelatos, Spyros; Puchner, Walter; Tambaki, Anna; Georgousopoulos, Kostas; Mavromoustakos, Platon; Fessa-Emmanouil, Eleni (1997). Modern Greek Theatre (17th-20th Century) (in Greek). Athens, Greece: National Hellenic Research Foundation. ISBN 960-7094-96-4.
- Greene, Roland; Cushman, Stephen; Cavanagh, Clare; Ramazani, Jahan; Rouzer, Paul, eds. (2012). The Princeton Encyclopedia of Poetry and Poetics (4th ed.). Princeton, NJ: Princeton University Press. ISBN 9781400841424.
- Hadjivassiliou, Vangelis; Kaklamanis, Stefanos; Kotzia, Elisabeth; Petsopoulos, Stavros; Tsirimokou, Elisabeth; Yatromanolakis, Yoryis, eds. (2001). Greece: Books and Writers. Athens, Greece: National Book Centre of Greece, Ministry of Culture. ISBN 960-7894-29-4.
- Holton, David (1991). Literature and Society in Renaissance Crete. Cambridge, UK: Cambridge University Press. ISBN 9780521325790.
- Kefalas, Ilias (1987). The Generation of the Private Vision (in Greek). Athens, Greece: Tethrippon.
- Kitromilides, Paschalis M. (2013). Enlightenment and Revolution: The Making of Modern Greece. Cambridge, MA: Harvard University Press. ISBN 978-0-674-72505-8.
- Kordatos, Yanis (1983a). History of Modern Greek Literature: From 1453 to 1961 (in Greek). Vol. I (2nd ed.). Athens, Greece: Epikairotita.
- Kordatos, Yanis (1983b). History of Modern Greek Literature: From 1453 to 1961 (in Greek). Vol. II (2nd ed.). Athens, Greece: Epikairotita.
- Mastrodimitris, P.D. (2005). Introduction to Modern Greek Philology (in Greek) (7th ed.). Athens, Greece: Domos. ISBN 960-353-125-1.
- Merry, Bruce (2004). Encyclopedia of Modern Greek Literature. Westport, CT: Greenwood Press. ISBN 0-313-30813-6.
- Papageorgiou, Kostas G. (2016). The Generation of the '70s (in Greek) (2nd ed.). Athens, Greece: Kedros. ISBN 978-960-04-4680-7.
- Politis, Linos (1973). A History of Modern Greek Literature. Oxford, UK: Clarendon Press.
- Puchner, Walter; Walker White, Andrew (2017). Greek Theatre between Antiquity and Independence: A History of Reinvention from the Third Century BC to 1830. Cambridge, UK: Cambridge University Press. ISBN 978-1-107-05947-4.
- Skartsis, Sokratis L., ed. (1987). Proceedings of the Sixth Poetry Symposium: Modern Greek Post-War Poetry (1945-1985) (in Greek). Athens, Greece: Gnosi.
- Stabakis, Nikos, ed. (2008). Surrealism in Greece: An Anthology. Austin, TX: University of Texas Press. ISBN 978-0-292-71800-5.
- Vitti, Mario (2003). History of Modern Greek Literature (in Greek). Athens, Greece: Odysseas. ISBN 960-210-460-0.
- Willhardt, Mark; Parker, Alan Michael, eds. (2005). Who's Who in Twentieth Century World Poetry. London, UK: Routledge. ISBN 9781134713769.
