= David Holton =

British professor of Modern Greek language and literature

David William Holton (born Northampton 1946) is Emeritus Professor of Modern Greek at the University of Cambridge. He was educated at Northampton Grammar School and Hertford College, University of Oxford, where he studied Classics and Medieval and Modern Greek. He completed his DPhil thesis at Oxford in 1971. From 1973 until 1975 he was a Research Fellow at the University of Birmingham, where he also worked as a university administrator (1975-1981). In 1981 he was appointed Lewis-Gibson Lecturer in Modern Greek at the University of Cambridge; in 1982 he became a Fellow of Selwyn College. He was promoted to Reader in 2000 and Professor of Modern Greek in 2006, and retired in 2013.

He specialises in medieval and modern Greek language and literature, with special reference to the romance genre, early printing, Crete and Cyprus under Venetian rule, and the history and present structure of Greek. He directed the AHRC research project which produced the four-volume Cambridge Grammar of Medieval and Early Modern Greek, co-authored with Geoffrey Horrocks, (Emeritus Professor of Comparative Philology and a Fellow of St John's College, Cambridge), Marjolijne Janssen, Tina Lendari, Io Manolessou and Panagiotis Toufexis, published in 2019 by Cambridge University Press. This monumental work is the world's first grammar of the vernacular Greek of the Middle Ages and the Early Modern period (up to c. 1700).

== Works (selection) ==
- «Τα πολιτισμικά συμφραζόμενα της κυπριακής Συλλογής: Η σχέση της με τα μαδριγάλια του Giandomenico Martoretta», in: Marina Rodosthenous-Balafa (ed.), Μελέτες για την κυπριακή Συλλογή Αναγεννησιακών ποιημάτων. Athens: Ethniko Idryma Erevnon 2022 pp. 21-52.
- «Τι διάβασε ο Βιτσέντζος Κορνάρος πριν γράψει τον Ερωτόκριτο;», in: M. Hnaraki (ed.), «Γιατί... Ερωτόκριτος στον 21ο αιώνα στην Κρήτη και τον Κόσμο;» / “Why... Erotokritos in the 21st century in Crete and the world?”. Πεπραγμένα Συνεδρίου. Heraklion: World Council of Cretans 2021, pp. 39-54.
- «Γιατί χρειάζεται μια γραμματική της μεσαιωνικής και πρώιμης νέας ελληνικής;», in: Vasileios Sabatakakis (ed.), Στ΄ Ευρωπαϊκό Συνέδριο Νεοελληνικών Σπουδών της Ευρωπαϊκής Εταιρείας Νεοελληνικών Σπουδών. Ο ελληνικός κόσμος σε περιόδους κρίσης και ανάκαμψης, 1204-2018. Λουντ, 4-7 Οκτωβρίου 2018: Πρακτικά. Athens 2020. Τόμος Γ΄, pp. 395-404.
- “Kazantzakis in Cambridge.” In P. Mackridge and D. Ricks (eds.). The British Council and Anglo-Greek literary interactions, 1945-1955. Abingdon: Routledge 2020, pp. 215-26.
- Eleni Papargyriou, Semele Assinder and David Holton (eds.), Greece in British Women's Literary Imagination, 1913-2013. New York: Peter Lang 2017.
- “The Tragic, the Comic and the Tragicomic in Cretan Renaissance Literature.” In Margaret Alexiou and Douglas Cairns (eds.), Greek Laughter and Tears: Antiquity and After. Edinburgh: Edinburgh University Press 2017, pp. 375-89.
- “The role of translation in early Cypriot literature.” In M. Pieris (ed.), Διά ανθύμησιν καιρού και τόπου. Λογοτεχνικές Αποτυπώσεις του Κόσμου της Κύπρου. Πρακτικά Διεθνούς Επιστημονικού Συνεδρίου, Λευκωσία, 6-9 Οκτωβρίου 2012. Nicosia 2015, pp. 239-53.
- “Ξαναδιαβάζοντας τον Ερωτόκριτο.” In Ο κόσμος του Ερωτόκριτου και ο Ερωτόκριτος στον κόσμο. Πρακτικά Διεθνούς Επιστημονικού Συνεδρίου (Σητεία, 31/7-2/8/2009). Επιμέλεια: Τασούλα Μ. Μαρκομιχελάκη. Heraklion: Dimos Siteias 2012, pp. 29-42.
- (with Peter Mackridge and Irene Philippaki-Warburton) Greek: a comprehensive grammar. 2nd edition. Revised by Vassilios Spyropoulos (London: Routledge 2012).
- "The first Modern Greek printed book: Apokopos (1509)", The Anglo-Hellenic Review 42 (Autumn 2010) 16-19
- David Holton, Tina Lendari, Ulrich Moennig, Peter Vejleskov (eds.): Copyists, Collectors, Redactors and Editors: Manuscripts and Editions of Late Byzantine and Early Modern Greek Literature. Papers given at a Conference held at the Danish Institute at Athens, 23–26 May 2002, in honour of Hans Eideneier and Arnold van Gemert. Herakleion: Πανεπιστημιακές Εκδόσεις Κρήτης, Herakleion 2005, S. 251–273.
- "Modern Greek: towards a standard language or a new diglossia?", in: M.C. Jones and E. Esch (eds.), Language change: the interplay of internal, external and extra-linguistic factors (Berlin - New York: Mouton de Gruyter 2002), pp. 169–79.
- Διήγησις του Αλεξάνδρου. The Tale of Alexander. The Rhymed Version. Critical edition with introduction and commentary. Morfotiko Idryma Ethnikis Trapezis, Athens 2002.
- Μελέτες για τον Ερωτόκριτο και άλλα νεοελληνικά κείμενα, Kastaniotis, Athens 2001. (Studies on Erotokritos and other modern Greek texts).
- (ed.) Literature and society in Renaissance Crete. Cambridge University Press, 1991, ISBN 0-521-32579-X.
- (with Peter Mackridge, Irene Philippaki-Warburton): Greek. A comprehensive grammar of the modern language. Routledge, London 1997. Greek translation: Patakis, Athens 1999.
- (with Peter Mackridge, Irene Philippaki-Warburton): Greek. An essential grammar of the modern language. Routledge, London 2004. Greek translation: Patakis, Athens 2007.
- "Classical Antiquity and Cretan Renaissance Poetry." In: Journal of the Hellenic Diaspora, 27.1-2, 2001, pp. 87–101, brynmawr.edu (PDF).
