= Elizabeth Moutzan-Martinegou =

Greek writer (1801–1832)

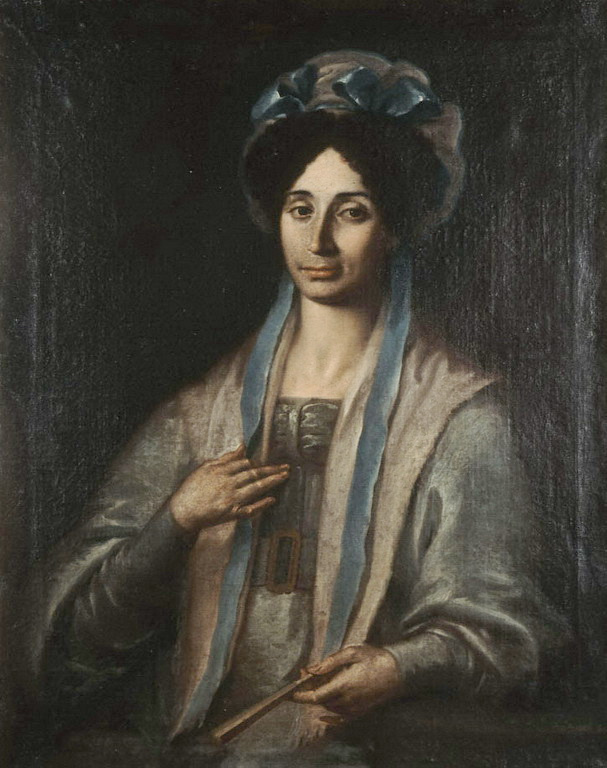
Elizabeth Moutzan-Martinegkou portrait by Nikolaos Kantounis

Elizabeth Moutzan-Martinegou (Greek: Ελισάβετ Μουτζάν-Μαρτινέγκου; October 1801–November 1832) was a Greek writer from Zakynthos. She wrote poetry, more than fifteen theatrical plays, and works on economics and poetic theory. She also translated works of classical literature, including the Odyssey and Aeschylus' tragedy Prometheus Bound. She is the first prominent female writer of modern Greek literature. Her most famous work is her autobiography.

== Biography ==
Her parents, Fragiskos Moutzan and Aggeliki Sigourou, were descended from two of the oldest aristocratic families in Zakynthos. Elisabeth Moutzan took a special interest in learning and letters from a young age and, although her education was restricted (to home schooling by three priests), through her own studies she acquired knowledge of the Ancient Greek, Italian and French languages. At the same time she threw herself into writing poetry, theatrical works in both Greek and Italian and translations of Ancient Greek literature. Her desire was to avoid marriage, and instead to dedicate herself to study and writing.

Because of the objections of her family, she proposed instead that she should be cloistered in a monastery or withdraw to a residence belonging to her family in the countryside. However these wishes were also not considered acceptable by her relatives. Faced with the prospect of remaining unmarried and residing with her parents, without the right to go outside the house, she decided to secretly leave the island. But after one failed attempt she returned, without any member of the household detecting it, and was finally forced to give in and accept the wishes of her family that she should marry.

Finding a prospective husband on Zakynthos, then part of the United States of the Ionian Islands was especially difficult and for this reason her uncle suggested that they should travel to the Italian peninsula, where it would be easier to find a bridegroom for Elisabeth as well as her sister, who was also at marriageable age, but the trip never took place because her father fell ill. In the meantime a candidate for marriage, Nicholas Martinegos, had been found, but he endlessly delayed the formalization of the marriage contract with continuous negotiations about the size of the dowry. However, after 16 months, in the summer 1831, the marriage ceremony was finally celebrated. The marriage was not to last long, unfortunately, as Elisabeth Moutzan-Martinegou died on 9 November 1832, two weeks after the birth of her son as a result of complications during childbirth.

== Works ==
Apart from the Autobiography, which is her best known and most notable work, Elisabeth Moutzan wrote more than 15 plays, in both Greek and Italian, translated ancient texts and composed a number of poems.

The Autobiography was published by her son, Elisabetio, in 1881, with some cuts, and in a volume with some of her poems. The merit of the work lies primarily in the simple language that is used. Of her other works, few have survived: one comedy entitled The Miser, some texts in Italian, 20 letters, the prologue to a treatise On Economics, the poems Ode to the Passion of Jesus Christ and To the Mother of God and fragments of translations of Prometheus Bound the Odyssey and Aeschylus's The Suppliants.

== Selected works ==
- My Story, Moutzan-Martinengou, Elisavet. Published by University of Georgia Press, Baltimore, 1989
