= Rhea Galanaki =

Greek author

Rea Galanaki (Greek: Ρέα Γαλανάκη) is a Greek author who was born in Heraklion, Crete in 1947. She studied history and archaeology at the University of Athens. She has published novels, short stories, essays and poetry books.

Her six novels (The life of Ismail Ferik Pasha, I shall sigh aw Louis, Eleni or Nobody, The Century of Labyrinths, Silent deep sea, Jouda’s Fires and Oedipus ’ Ashes) have established her as one of the leading Greek novelists. She has touched subjects as the double identities, the division between two countries, the impossibility of nostos, the meaning of nationality or femininity, of history itself; close to these, and during last years, she has been focused at subjects as the reappearance of racism, fascism, crisis and the contemporary social changes. She is widely known for her unique, thoughtful and sensitive way of writing. Her prose is recognized at her novels, based either on up to day, or on historical problems. She is also considered as the renovator of the so called historical novel. Critical essays on Rhea Galanaki’s works have been published not only in Greek newspapers and literature magazines, but, among others, in the T.L.S.(2004, on the occasion of Olympic Games), in Le Monde and Le Soir (1992), the Frankfurter Allgemeine Zeitung, Sudwest Presse, Frankfurter Rundschau (2002).

Her novels have been translated in 15 languages: English, French, German, Spanish, Italian, Ukrainian, Dutch, Czech, Catalan, Bulgarian, Swedish, Lithuanian, Turkish, Arab, Chinese, Hebrew and Albanian.

== Awards ==
- 1999 National Award for Literature
- 2004 National Academy Award
- 2005 National Award for Literature
- 2006 Reader's Choice Award of the National Book Center of Greece

== Selected bibliography ==
=== Books ===
- (1975). Πλην εύχαρις. Athēna: "Olkos". OCLC 18152669

(Yet Joyful, Athēna : "Olkos" Press)

- (1979). Τα ορυκτά. Athēna: Diogienēs. OCLC 84272672

(The Minerals, Athēna: Diogienēs Press)

- (1980). Το κέικ. Εκδόσεις Κέδρος, OCLC 10331274

(The cake, Agra Press)

- (1986). Πού ζει ο λύκος;. Εκδόσεις Άγρα. OCLC 221616944

(Where Does the Wolf Live, Agra Press)

- (1993). Θα υπογράφω Λουί. Άγρα. ISBN 9789603250562

& Kolias, H. D. (translator). (2000). I shall sign as Loui. Evanston, Ill: Northwestern University Press. ISBN 9780810117372. OCLC 44426984

- (1994). Πλην εύχαρις. Τα ορυκτά. Άγρα. ISBN 9789603250906

(Yet Joyful. The Minerals. Agra Press)

- (1997). Ομόκεντρα διηγήματα. Άγρα. ISBN 9789603252108

(Homo-centric Stories. Agra Press)

- (1997). Βασιλεύς ή στρατιώτης. Άγρα. ISBN 9789603251972

(King or Soldier. Agra Press)

- (1998). Ελένη ή ο Kανένας. Άγρα. ISBN 9789603252535

(Eleni, or, Nobody. Agra Press).

- (2002). Ο βίος του Ισμαήλ Φερίκ Πασά. Άγρα. ISBN 9789603253792

& Kaiē Tsitselē (translator). (1996). The life of Ismail Ferik Pasha: spina nel cuore. London: P. Owen. ISBN 9780720609653

- (2002). Ο αιώνας των λαβυρίνθων. Εκδόσεις Καστανιώτη. ISBN 9789600333435

(The Age of the Labyrinths. Kastaniotis Press)

- (2004). Ένα σχεδόν γαλάζιο χέρι. Εκδόσεις Καστανιώτη. ISBN 9789600337549

(An Almost Blue Hand. Kastaniotis Press)

- (2004). Ελένη ή ο Κανένας. Εκδόσεις Καστανιώτη. ISBN 9789600335835

& Connolly, D (translator). (2003). Eleni, or, Nobody. Evanston, Ill: Northwestern University Press. ISBN 9780810118850. OCLC 51478002

- (2005). Θα υπογράφω Λουί. Εκδόσεις Καστανιώτη. ISBN 9789600339475

(I shall sign as Loui. Agra Press)

- (2006). Αμίλητα. βαθιά νερά. Εκδόσεις Καστανιώτη. ISBN 9789600341805

(Deep. Silent Waters. Kastaniotis Press)

- (2007). Θα υπογράφω Λουί. Εκδόσεις Καστανιώτη. ISBN 9789600343403

(I shall sign as Loui. Agra Press)

- (2008). Ποιήματα. Εκδόσεις Καστανιώτη. ISBN 9789600348026

(Poems. Kastaniotis Press)

- (2009). Φωτιές του Ιούδα. Στάχτες του Οιδίποδα. Εκδόσεις Καστανιώτη. ISBN 9789600349924

(Fires of Judas. Ashes of Oedipus. Kastaniotis Press)

- (2011). Ο αιώνας των λαβυρίνθων. Έθνος Εκδόσεις Καστανιώτη. ISBN 9789600333435

(The Age of the Labyrinths. Kastaniotis Press)

- (2011). Από τη ζωή στη λογοτεχνία. Εκδόσεις Καστανιώτη. ISBN 9789600353143

(From Life to Literature. Kastaniotis Press)

- (2015). Η άκρα ταπείνωση. Εκδόσεις Καστανιώτη. ISBN 9789600358834

(Absolute Humiliation. Kastaniotis Press)

=== Participation in collective works ===
- (2013). Συνταγές μέσα από τη λογοτεχνία. Δημοσιογραφικός Οργανισμός Λαμπράκη. ISBN 9789605034368
- (2012). 6 φωνές, 6 γυναίκες. Γενική Γραμματεία Ισότητας των Φύλων. ISBN 9789608334250
- (2011). Jean Altamouras. Benaki Museum. ISBN 9789604760909
- (2011) . Ο κύκλος του βιβλίου: Ο συγγραφέας, ο επιμελητής-τυπογράφος, ο εκδότης, ο κριτικός, ο αναγνώστης. Σχολή Μωραΐτη. Εταιρεία Σπουδών Νεοελληνικού Πολιτισμού και Γενικής Παιδείας [εισήγηση]. ISBN 9789602591314
- (2007). Μετά το '89. Εκδόσεις Γαβριηλίδης. ISBN 9789603362692
- (2007). Συγγραφικές εμμονές. Εκδόσεις Καστανιώτη. ISBN 9789600344684
- (2007). Σύγχρονη ερωτική ποίηση. Εκδόσεις Καστανιώτη. ISBN 9789600342666
- (2005). Ο δρόμος για την Ομόνοια. Εκδόσεις Καστανιώτη. ISBN 9600340374

(The Road to Omonia, Kastaniotis Press)

- (2005). Πάτρα, το πρόσωπο της πόλης. Εκδόσεις Τοπίο. ISBN 9607646738

(Patra, the Face of the City, Topio Publications)

- (1997). Ιστορική πραγματικότητα και νεοελληνική πεζογραφία 1945-1995. Σχολή Μωραΐτη. Εταιρεία Σπουδών Νεοελληνικού Πολιτισμού και Γενικής Παιδείας [εισήγηση]. ISBN 9602590920
