= The Treasure of Vaghia =

1969 novel by Georges Sari

- Greek cover of the novel The Treasure of Vaghia by Georges Sarri.
- Author: Georges Sari
- Original title: Ο θησαυρός της Βαγίας
- Cover artist: Thanasis Georgiou
- Genre: Novel
- Published: 1969 Patakis Publishers
- Publication place: Greece
- Pages: 152 pp
- ISBN: 978-960-293-679-5

The Treasure of Vaghia (Greek: Ο θησαυρός της Βαγίας) is a 1969 novel by Greek author Georges Sari. It is her first novel and is partially autobiographical. A television series based upon the book aired on Ellinikí Radiofonía Tileórasi in 1984.

== Plot summary ==
This summer a group of children spend a wonderful holiday on the Greek island of Aegina. The arrival of a beloved French friend, a young psychiatrist working in Paris, will bring, apart from joy, a mission. To find a hidden treasure that could help a falling friend drive away his demons. A novel of strong emotion, full of adventure and rich descriptions, where the author perfectly recreates the particular atmosphere of children’s summertime on an island.
