= Soti Triantafyllou =

Greek writer, columnist, translator

- Born: December 31, 1957 (age 68); Athens, Greece
- Education: University of Athens (pharmacology, French literature); EHESS (American history)
- Occupations: Historian, novelist, essayist, political pundit, translator

Soti Triantafyllou (also Triantafillou; Greek: Σώτη Τριανταφύλλου; born 1957) is a Greek writer, columnist, translator, and political/social commentator. She is based in Athens and Paris.

== Education ==
Soti Triantafyllou was born in downtown Athens (Fokionos Negri). She attended English-Hellenic Elementary School and graduated from Arsakeion High School. Her further education includes: Diplôme d'Études de Lettres et Civilisation Françaises, Université de Nice, Faculté des Lettres et Sciences Humaines, Nice, France (1979), Bachelor of Science; Faculty of Pharmacy, University of Athens, Athens, Greece (Oct. 1979), Diplôme d'Études Approfondies (DEA), Faculty of History and Civilizations, EHESS, Paris (with professor Marc Ferro), France (1981), PhD, American History and Civilization, EHESS, Paris (thesis: “The Image of the U.S. Through the Hollywood Comedy 1946-1960” with Professor Marc Ferro), France (1984), PhD, History of American Cities, NYU (thesis: “Los Angeles, California and Athens, Greece: Urban Patterns” with professor Jean Heffer) (1989). She did post-doctoral research at the Centre Alexandre-Koyré in Paris (History and Philosophy of Mathematics) and at the EHESS (Russian Studies).

== Career ==
Soti Triantafyllou has worked as a political columnist for 35 years. She has contributed to most Greek dailies and magazines writing about international politics and, occasionally, about cars. She has also worked as professor of history and film studies at the Hellenic Film School, (1985-2000) and she has been a visiting lecturer at the University of Western Macedonia (Creative Writing) and at Aegean University (Faculty of Geography and Urbanism, Mytilene, Greece (2004-2007)), at the University of Athens (Strategic Studies). Her academic work includes the project “The Image of Los Angeles in the Movies” (with Professor Jean Heffer) for the Centre d'Études Nord-Américaines, Paris, France (1984-1985). Her 10th novel, "Rare Earths", came out in October 2013. She is trilingual (Greek, English, French) and she translates from four languages including Italian and German.

She won the 2018 National Award for Novel for her work The End of the World in an English Garden (Patakis 2017). Soti Triantafyllou is a militant atheist.

In 2010 she talked with Süddeutsche Zeitung about the skepticism of the Greek people following the election of Giorgos Papandreou.

== Awards ==
- Premio Alziator for Chinese Boxes, 2007
- Queer Award for best play Mechanic Falls (staged by Stamatis Patronis), 2014
- Konstantinos Kalligas for Journalism, 2017
- National Library Award for Best Novel The End of the World in an English Garden, 2019
