= Chrysa Dimoulidou =

Greek novelist, writing in modern Greek

Chrysiida (Chrysa) Dimoulidou
- Born: 1957 (age 68–69); Serres, Greece
- Occupation: Novelist
- Employer: Olympic Airways (1976–2000)
- Writing career
- Language: Modern Greek
- Years active: 1997–present
- Period: 1997–present
- Genres: Fiction; children's literature; poetry
- Notable work: Roses Aren't Always Scented

Chrysiida Dimoulidou (born 1957) is a Greek novelist, writing in modern Greek. She was born in Serres, northern Greece, where she grew up. From 1976 until 2000, she worked for Olympic Airways, Greece's national carrier. Between 1984 and 1985, she was a reporter for the magazine called Discomoda.

She has travelled widely throughout the world, a fact that has provided inspiration in her writing career. She speaks Greek, English, French and Italian.

== Works ==
Her first novel called Roses aren't Always Scented was published in 1997. Since then, she has written more than 18 books, including four children's books.

She also writes poetry and creates collage art.

The author is currently published in the Greek market by Psichogios Publications.
