= Kostas Papageorgiou =

Greek poet & critic (1945–2021)

- Born: 1945; Athens, Greece
- Died: 3 May 2021 (aged 75–76)
- Occupations: Poet and critic
- Writing career
- Period: 1966–2021

Kostas Papageorgiou (Greek: Κώστας Παπαγεωργίου; 1945 – 3 May 2021 in Athens) was an acclaimed Greek poet and critic.

He read Law and Philology and worked as a lawyer from 1972 to 1978. Since then, he is involved only in literature-related employment.

Papageorgiou died at the age of 76, on 3 May 2021.

Through the years he has contributed to almost all the major Greek literary periodicals He has published reviews in newspapers, such Eleftherotypia and he used to publish a periodical titled Γράμματα και Τέχνες (Letters and Arts). Since 1982, he has been working for the Greek National Radio as a consultant in literary matters, and producer for cultural broadcastings.

== Selected works ==
=== Poetry ===
- Ποιήματα (Poems), 1966
- Συλλογή (Collection), 1970
- Το οικογενειακό δέντρο (The family tree), 1978
- Το σκοτωμένο αίμα (Dead blood), 1982
- Ποιήματα (1972–2000) (Poems 1972–2000), 2004

=== Prose ===
- Των Αγίων Πάντων (All Saints), 1992
- Άννα, τώρα κοιμήσου (Sleep now, Anna), 1995
- Αντί σιωπής (Instead of silence), 2003

=== Essays ===
- Η γενιά του '70 (Ιστορία, ποιητικές διαδρομές) (The Generation of the 1970s. History, poetic pathways), 1989
- Τα άδεια γήπεδα (The empty pitches), 1994
