= Christodoulos Pablekis =

Greek scholar (1733–1793)

- Χριστόδουλος Παμπλέκης
- Born: 1733; Bampini, Ottoman Empire (now Greece)
- Died: 1793 (aged 59–60); Leipzig, Holy Roman Empire (now Germany)
- Education: Athonite Academy
- Occupation: Sholar

Christodoulos Pablekis (Greek: Χριστόδουλος Παμπλέκης, 1733–1793) was a Greek scholar of the 18th century, one of the most radical scholars in the Modern Greek Enlightenment movement.

== Life ==
Christodoulos Efstathiou Pablekis was born in the village of Bampini in Aetolia. At a young age he lost his left eye to illness and his father. He studied in the Athonite Academy under Eugenios Voulgaris and became a monk.

In 1759 he went to Vienna, where he worked as a scholar for the Greek community. He later found himself in Leipzig and in 1781 he published in Venice the "Real Politic", where he expresses his theses on governance and religion. In 1786 in Vienna he published his work "About Philosophy, Physics, Metaphysics, Spiritual and God" (Περί φιλοσόφου, φιλοσοφίας, φυσικών, μεταφυσικών, πνευματικών και Θείων) which was influenced by Newton, Diderot, D’Alembert, D’Holbach, Rousseau, Bacon and Cartesius. He criticized the orthodox clergy and condemned aspects of the Christian religion.

In 1791, influenced by Voltaire, he published "Tropaeon of Orthodoxy", and expressed deist sentiments. He died in 1793 in Leipzig.

In 1793, after his death and in response to his critics, his students published his unfinished work "About Theocracy" (Περί Θεοκρατίας) or "Apantisis", in which he criticized the Church and favored separation of church and state. For this work the orthodox Holy Synod in Fanari excommunicated Pablekis, post mortem, his students, the readers of the book and anyone who spread such ideas.

== Sources ==
- Panagiotis Kondylis, «Ο Ψαλίδας, ο Παμπλέκης και η θεία Αποκάλυψη», Ηπειρωτικά Χρονικά, 24 (1982), σελ. 249–266.
- Χριστόδουλος Παμπλέκης
