= Dinos Christianopoulos =

Greek poet (1931–2020)

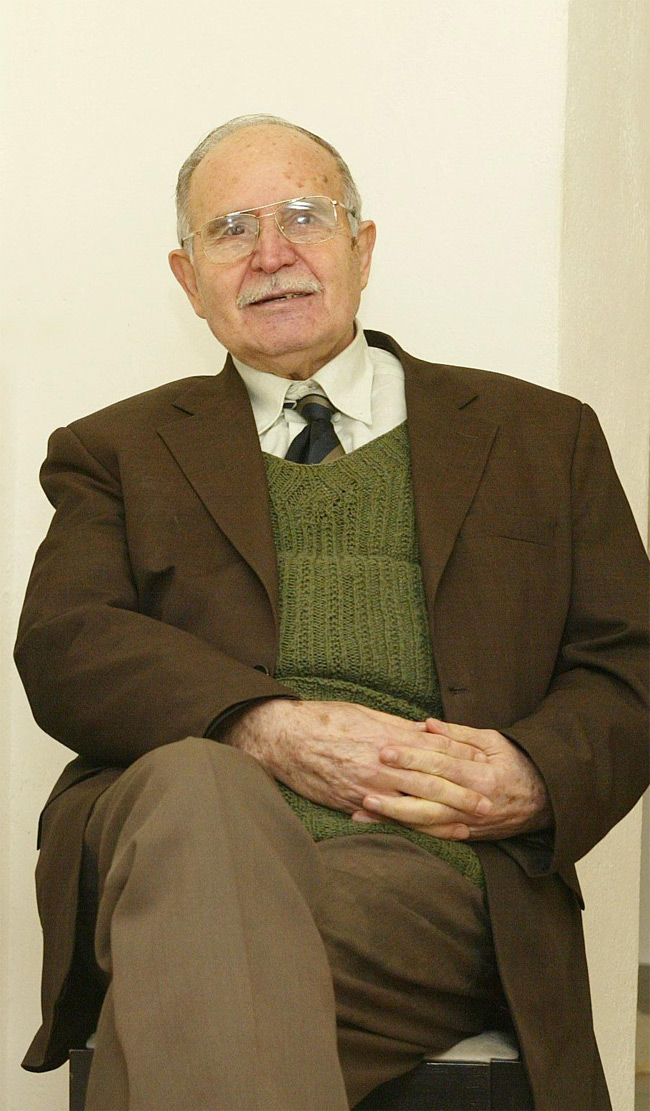
- Born: Konstantinos Dimitriadis; 20 March 1931; Thessaloniki, Greece
- Died: 11 August 2020 (aged 89); Thessaloniki, Greece
- Education: Aristotle University of Thessaloniki
- Writing career
- Genres: Novels; poetry

Konstantinos Dimitriadis (Greek: Κωνσταντίνος Δημητριάδης; 20 March 1931 – 11 August 2020), better known by his pen name Dinos Christianopoulos (Ντίνος Χριστιανόπουλος), was a Greek contemporary and post-war poet, novelist, folklorist, and scholar. He was also a music scholar who wrote about rebetiko.

== Legacy ==
He is widely known for writing the couplet: "What didn’t you do to bury me / but you forgot I was a seed."

== Biography ==
Dimitriadis was born in Thessaloniki on 20 March 1931, the son of a refugee from East Thrace. He received a degree in Classical Studies from the Aristotle University of Thessaloniki in 1955. He worked as a librarian from 1958 to 1965.

His first poem Age of Lean Cows was published in 1947. He was influenced by Constantine P. Cavafy and T.S. Eliot. Dimitriadis was gay, but he never claimed his sexuality. He was awarded the 2011 National Grand Prix for Literature, but refused to pick it up. Aristotle University of Thessaloniki awarded him an honorary doctorate in June 2011.

He died on 11 August 2020 at the age of 89. His work was donated to the Aristotle University of Thessaloniki.

== Bibliography ==
- Season of the Lean Cows, 1950
- Indefensible Yearning, 1960
- Fresh Water Stories, 1980
- The Body and the Wormwood
- The downward turn: Fourteen short stories, 1994
