= Yannis Maris =

Yannis Tsirimokos (1916–1979) was a Greek left-wing journalist, better known under the pen name Yannis Maris (Γιάννης Μαρής) as a writer of detective fiction. From 1953, Maris wrote over forty short and well-plotted novels that at the time were looked down on in Greece as pulp fiction, but have in later years come to be regarded as classics of the crime genre. Many of the novels feature Inspector Bekas (Αστυνόμος Μπέκας), the title figure of a contemporary Greek TV series. Maris was noted for the humorous and coded names of his book's characters.

== Biography ==
Yannis Tsirimokos, descending from a well-known family in Fthiotida, was born in Skopelos in January 1916, where his father, Demosthenes Tsirimokos, served as a judge. The politician Ilias Tsirimokos (later MP, minister and prime minister of Greece) was his second cousin. He spent his childhood in Chios and Larissa, and later attended the Law School of Thessaloniki. He developed an intense political activity and joined socialist cycles. Alongside Ilias Tsirimokos and Alexandros Svolos, he participated in the founding of the Union of People's Democracy, and later joined EAM.

After the end of World War II, he began to work in journalism. He worked for the newspaper Machi (main organ of the Union of People's Democracy) as its editor-in-chief, a commentator and film critic. After the newspaper's revelations about Makronissos, he was prosecuted and imprisoned. He was released following the intervention of the Socialist International and Alexandros Svolos. He would then work at the newspapers Progressive Liberal (Προοδευτικός Φιλελεύθερος), Free Speech (Ελεύθερος Λόγος), Athenian (Αθηναϊκή), and finally ended up at the Botsi complex (Akropolis, Apogevmatini and Proto magazine).

He began his literary work in the early 1950s, publishing his novel Crime in Kolonaki (1953) in serial form in the weekly magazine Family, until the publication was discontinued. This novel was self-published in a volume shortly afterwards and then published by Atlantis (Ατλαντίς). It would be a huge success and in 1959 it would be transferred to the cinema with similar success. He continued to write tirelessly for more than 25 years, leaving behind a number of crime novels, some twenty screenplays and two plays. Said crime novels have been reprinted many times and have been occasionally offered as inserts in daily newspapers, and his work has been cited by many contemporary authors in the genre.

A man of many talents, Maris possessed the "gift of speaking", and even took part in the report on the investigation of the assassination of the independent left-wing MP Grigoris Lambrakis.

He died in Athens on 13 November 1979 from a brain tumor.

== Selected works ==
- Crime in Kolonaki (1953)

== Film adaptations ==
- A Matter of Life and Death (Zitima Zois kai Thanatou, Vagelis Serdaris (1972).
