= List of Greek writers =

This is a list of Greek writers.

== The Ionian writers ==
- Andreas Kalvos
- Dionysios Solomos
- Gregorios Xenopoulos

== The Romantic writers ==
- Dimitrios Vikelas

== The New Athenian writers ==
- Christos Christovasilis
- Kostas Karyotakis
- Napoleon Lapathiotis
- Kostis Palamas
- Alexandros Papadiamantis
- Angelos Sikelianos
- Gregorios Xenopoulos

== The 1930s ==
- Penelope Delta
- M. Karagatsis
- Nikos Kavvadias
- Nikos Kazantzakis
- Giannis Skarimpas
- Stratis Myrivilis
- Yiorgos Theotokas
- Elias Venezis

== The Surrealists ==
- Nanos Valaoritis
- Andreas Empeirikos
- Nicolas Calas

== Greek writers from 1944–1974 ==
- Aris Alexandrou
- Manolis Anagnostakis
- Odysseas Elytis
- Nikos Karouzos
- Melissanthi
- Katina Papa
- Giorgos Seferis
- Yiannis Ritsos
- Miltos Sachtouris
- Takis Sinopoulos
- Antonis Samarakis

== Modern Greek writers ==
- Sam Albatros
- Auguste Corteau
- Nikos Dimou
- Maro Douka
- Justine Frangouli-Argyris
- Kostis Gimossoulis
- Alexandros Giotis
- Panos Karnezis
- Dimitri Kitsikis
- Yannis Kondos
- Dimosthenis Kourtovik
- George Leonardos
- Dimitris Lyacos
- Christoforos Liontakis
- Aris Marangopoulos
- Petros Markaris
- Jenny Mastoraki
- George Pol Papadakis
- Lefteris Poulios
- Vangelis Raptopoulos
- Alexis Stamatis
- Vassilis Steriadis
- Stefanos Tassopoulos
- Soti Triantafyllou
- Sotiris Trivizas
- Haris Vlavianos

== Unsorted ==
- Apostolos Doxiadis
- Konstantinos Kavafis
- Dean Kalymniou
- Christos Tsiolkas
- Yannis Xirotiris

== See also ==
- List of Greek women writers
