= List of modern Greek poets =

This is a list of modern Greek poets (years link to corresponding "[year] in poetry" article).

== List ==
- Andreas Kalvos (1792–1869)
- Dionysios Solomos (1798–1857)
- George Tsimbidaros-Fteris (1891–1967)
- Andreas Laskaratos (1811–1901)
- Aristotelis Valaoritis (1824–1879)
- Kostis Palamas (1859–1943)
- Athos Dimoulas (1921–1985)
- Constantine Cavafy (1863–1933)
- Nikos Kazantzakis (1883–1957)
- Angelos Sikelianos (1884–1951)
- Kostas Varnalis (1884–1974)
- Napoleon Lapathiotis (1889–1944)
- Giannis Skarimpas (1893–1984)
- Kostas Karyotakis (1896–1928)
- Giorgos Seferis (1900–1971)
- Andreas Empeirikos (1901–1975)
- Maria Polydouri (1902–1930)
- D.I. Antoniou (1906–1994)
- Nikos Engonopoulos (1907–1985)
- Yannis Ritsos (1909–1990)
- Nikos Kavvadias (1910–1975)
- Alexander Mátsas (1910–1969)
- Odysseus Elytis (1911–1996)
- Nikiforos Vrettakos (1912–1991)
- Nikos Gatsos (1915–1992)
- Takis Sinopoulos (1917–1981)
- Miltos Sachtouris (1919–2005)
- Ektor Kaknavatos (1920–2010)
- Nanos Valaoritis (1921-2019)
- Aris Alexandrou (1922–1978)
- Manolis Anagnostakis (1925–2005)
- Nikos Karouzos (1926–1990)
- Nikos Fokas (1927-2021)
- Titos Patrikios (b. 1928)
- Dinos Christianopoulos (b. 1931 –2020)
- Kiki Dimoula (b. 1931 –2020)
- Tassos Denegris (1934–2009)
- Stefanos Tassopoulos (1939–2013)
- Katerina Gogou (1940–1993)
- Kyriakos Charalambides (b. 1940)
- Yannis Kondos (b. 1943)
- Lefteris Poulios (b. 1944)
- Christoforos Liontakis (b. 1945)
- Vassilis Steriadis (b. 1947)
- Dimitris Varos (b. 1949)
- Evangelos Andreou (b. 1952)
- Antonis Fostieris (b. 1953)
- Sotiris Kakisis (b. 1954)
- Haris Vlavianos (b. 1957) Kermanidou Fotini (b.1957)
- Alexis Stamatis (b. 1960)
- Dimitris Lyacos (b. 1966)

== See also ==
- Modern Greek literature
- List of ancient Greek poets
