= List of Greek women writers =

This is a list of women writers who were born in Greece or whose writings are closely associated with that country.

== A ==
- Aganice Ainianos (1838–1892), poet
- Elli Alexiou (1894–1988), novelist, short story writer, playwright, journalist
- Loula Anagnostaki (1930–2017), playwright
- Marie Aspioti (1909–2000), Corfiote writer, playwright, poet, publisher, writing in English and Greek

== B ==
- Olga Broumas (born 1949), English-language poet, living in the United States

== D ==
- Emilia Dafni (1881–1941), poet, novelist
- Penelope Delta (1874–1941), novelist, children's writer
- Kiki Dimoula (1931–2020), poet
- Maro Douka (born 1947), novelist, short story writer, playwright, memoirist

== F ==
- Justine Frangouli-Argyris (born 1959), journalist, non-fiction writer, living in Canada

== G ==
- Rhea Galanaki (born 1947), novelist
- Evi Gkotzaridis, historian, author of Trials of Irish History (2007)
- Katerina Gogou (1940–1993), poet, actress
- Tatiana Gritsi-Milliex (1920–2005), novelist, journalist

== H ==
- Arianna Huffington (born 1950), Greek-born author, columnist, founder of The Huffington Post

== K ==
- Margarita Karapanou (1946–2008), novelist
- Ioanna Karystiani (born 1952), novelist, poet, short story writer, screenwriter
- Anna Komnene (1083–1153), Greek princess, author of the biographical Alexiad

== L ==
- Maria Laina (1947–2023), widely translated poet, critic, translator
- Angeliki Laiou (1941–2008), Byzantist historian

== M ==
- Jenny Mastoraki (1949–2024), poet, translator
- Melinno (2nd–1st century BCE), lyric poet
- Antigone Metaxa-Krontera (1905–1972), children's writer
- Rena Molho (born 1946), historian, works on Greek Jewish history
- Doula Mouriki (1934–1991), art historian
- Elizabeth Moutzan-Martinegou (1801–1832), poet, playwright and translator

== N ==
- Lilika Nakos (1904–1989), journalist, novelist

== P ==
- Katina Papa (1903–1959), poet, novelist
- Maria Papayanni (born 1964), children's writer
- Maria Polydouri (1902–1930), poet

== S ==
- Georges Sari (1925–2012), novelist, children's writer, actress
- Matilde Serao (1856–1927), Greek-born Italian journalist, novelist
- Dido Sotiriou (1909–2004), novelist, journalist, playwright
- Eliza Soutsou (1837–1887), writer
- Elisavet Spathari, archaeologist, author

== T ==
- Alkis Thrylos, pen name of Eleni Ourani (1896–1971), literary critic, non-fiction writer
- Soti Triantafyllou (born 1957), short story writer, novelist, essayist, translator
- Vasia Tzanakari (born 1980), novelist, translator

== V ==
- Helen Vlachos (1911–1995), acclaimed journalist, newspaper publisher, autobiographer

== Y ==
- Yovanna (born 1938), poet, novelist, songwriter, singer

== Z ==
- Alki Zei (1925–2020), novelist, children's writer
- Zyranna Zateli (born 1951), novelist, short story writer, non-fiction writer

== See also ==
- List of women writers
- List of Greek writers
