= David Connolly (translator) =

English-born Greek literary translator

David John Connolly (born 1954) is an English-born Greek literary translator. He has translated poetry and novels from Greek to English, including writing by Nikiforos Vrettakos, Odysseas Elytis, Kiki Dimoula and Nikos Engonopoulos.

== Life ==
David Connolly was born in Sheffield. He studied ancient Greek at the University of Lancaster and medieval and modern Greek literature at Trinity College, Oxford before gaining a PhD from the University of East Anglia on the theory and practice of literary translation. He has lived in Greece since 1979 and became a naturalized Greek citizen in 1998. He was Head of Translation at the British Council in Athens from 1991 to 1994, and lectured in literary translation at the Ionian University from 1991 to 1997 and at the University of Athens from 1999 to 2000. He has more recently taught at the Aristotle University of Thessaloniki.

Connolly's translated anthology The Dedalus Book of Greek Fantasy won the Hellenic Society's Modern Greek Translation Prize for 2004.

== Translations ==
- The Greek Epic 1940-41 by Angelos Terzakis. Athens, 1990.
- The Philosophy of Flowers by Nikiforos Vrettakos. Athens: Artigraf 1990.
- Gifts in Abeyance: Last Poems 1981-91 by Nikiforos Vrettakos. Minnesota: Nostos, 1992. ISBN 0-932963-07-2
- The Oxopetra Elegies by Odysseus Elytis. Amsterdam: Harwood Academic Publishers, 1996. ISBN 3-7186-5881-X
- Lethe's Adolescence by Kiki Dimoula. Minnesota: Nostos, 1996. ISBN 0-932963-08-0
- As if present by Thanassis Hatzopoulos. Chalkida: Diametros Publications, 1997. ISBN 960-7746-04-X
- Journal of An Unseen April by Odysseus Elytis. Athens: Ypsilon/Books, 1998. ISBN 960-7949-05-6
- Adieu by Haris Vlavianos. Birmingham: Centre for Byzantine, Ottoman and Modern Greek Studies, The University of Birmingham, 1998. ISBN 070-441-886-X
- Eroticon by Yoryis Yatromanolakis. Cambridge: Dedalus, 1999. ISBN 1-873982-88-7
- Carte Blanche. Selected Writings by Odysseus Elytis. Amsterdam: Harwood Academic Publishers, 1999. ISBN 90-5755-100-4
- The Seventh Elephant by Alexis Stamatis. London: Arcadia Books, 2000. ISBN 1-900850-21-4
- 'Roar!' by Pavlos Matesis. In Contemporary Greek Theatre, vol. 2, London: Arcadia Books, 2002. ISBN 1-900850-53-2
- Eleni, or, Nobody by Rhea Galanaki. Evanston, Ill.: Northwestern University Press, 2003. ISBN 0-8101-1885-8
- (ed.) The Dedalus Book of Greek Fantasy. Cambridge: Dedalus, 2004.
- The Nowhere Athlete by Yannis Kondos. Todmorden: Arc Publications.
- Bar Flaubert by Alexis Stamatis. London: Arcadia Books.
- Deadline in Athens: an inspector Costas Haritos mystery by Petros Markaris. New York: Grove Press, 2004.
- Homeric megathemes: war-homilia-homecoming by D. N. Marōnitēs. Lanham, Md.: Lexington Books, 2004.
- (ed.) Angelic & black: contemporary Greek short stories, River Vale, NJ: Cosmos Pub., 2006.
- The power of the dark god: a novel by Takēs Theodōropoulos. River Vale, N.J.: Cosmos Pub. Co., 2007.
- Hōraios san Hellēnas: anthologia poiēmaton / The beauty of a Greek: selected poems by Nikos Engonopoulos. Greek / English text. Athēna: Hypsilon, 2007.
- Mara's shade: selected poems, 1971-1995 by Anatassis Vistonitis. Huntington Beach, Calif.: Tebot Bach, 2011.
- "Fey Folk" by Alexandros Papadiamandis, translated by David Connolly, Aiora Press, Athens 2013
- C. P. Cavafy - Selected Poems, translated by David Connolly, Aiora Press, Athens 2013
- Nikiforos Vrettakos - Selected Poems, translated by David Connolly, Aiora Press, Athens, 2015
- Pythagoras, The Golden Verses, translated by David Connolly, Aiora Press, Athens, 2017
