= Poulios =

Poulios is a surname. Notable people with the surname include:

- Lefteris Poulios
- Katerina Poulios
- Konstantinos Poulios

== See also ==
- Markides Pouliou brothers
