= Alexandrou =

Alexandrou is a Greek surname, meaning "son of Alexander". Notable people with the surname include:

- Aris Alexandrou (1922–1978), Greek novelist, poet and translator
- James Alexandrou (born 1985), English actor
- Nektarios Alexandrou (born 1983), Cypriot footballer
