= The Striker with Number 9 =

1989 film

- Directed by: Pantelis Voulgaris
- Written by: Menis Koumantareas; Vangelis Raptopoulos
- Produced by: Pantelis Voulgaris
- Starring: Stratos Tzortzoglou
- Cinematography: Alexis Grivas
- Edited by: Takis Yannopoulos
- Release date: 20 October 1988
- Running time: 121 minutes
- Country: Greece
- Language: Greek

The Striker with Number 9 (Greek: Η φανέλα με το 9, translit. I fanela me to 9) is a 1988 Greek drama film directed by Pantelis Voulgaris. It was entered into the 39th Berlin International Film Festival. It is based on the novel by Menis Koumandareas and the screenplay was written by Vangelis Raptopoulos.

== Plot ==
The central character of the film is the young and unknown but full-fledged football player Vasilis "Bill" Seretis in his attempt to become a famous ace of the fields, not hesitating in the face of any obstacle. Crossing the fields of the Greek territory, from Thessaloniki to Volos and from there to Athens, Seretis knows success and apotheosis, but at the same time he sinks into loneliness and frustration.

== Cast ==
- Stratos Tzortzoglou as Bill Seretis
- Themis Bazaka as Kiki
- Nikos Bousdoukos as Giorgos Kapatos
- Stamatis Jelepis as Spyros
- Katia Sperelaki as Dora
- Nikos Tsachiridis as Tsalikis
- Kostas Kleftogiannis
- Anna Avgoula as Eva
- Stavros Kalaroglou
- Zano Danias
- Vangelis Pantazis
- Giannis Tsoubris
- Giannis Hatzigiannis
- Vasilis Vlahos
- Thanasis Mylonas as Votsis

== Awards ==
The film received the following awards and distinctions:

- Editing Award at the Thessaloniki International Film Festival
- Sound Award at the Thessaloniki International Film Festival
- Make-up Award at the State Quality Awards of the Ministry of Culture
- Quality distinction State Quality Awards of the Ministry of Culture
