= Dimitris Papaditsas =

Greek poet

Dimitris P. Papaditsas (Greek: Δημήτρης Π. Παπαδίτσας; 1922–1987) was a Greek poet.

== Biography ==
Dimitris P. Papaditsas was born in Samos, in 1922, son of an army officer. He studied medicine at the University of Athens, graduating in 1958. He continued with his studies, focusing in orthopedics, in Munich. Between 1943 and 1947 he worked for the Red Cross, and between 1951 and 1967 he was physician and orthopedic surgeon in several hospitals in Athens and other provincial Greek cities. In 1976, he moved to Athens and became director of the National Greek Institute of Rehabilitation.

He was founder of the Primal Matter (Πρώτη Ύλη), 1958–1959, along with Epameinondas Ch. Gonatas, and collaborated in other literary magazines such as Youth Voice (Νεανική Φωνή), New Hestia (Νέα Εστία), The Target (Ο Στόχος), among others. He received twice the First State Award for Poetry for Poetry I (Ποίηση Ι) in 1963 and for Δυοειδή λόγο in 1980. In 1983 he was awarded the Athens' Academy Award for Ασώματη.

His work is unique amidst the generation raised during the war in displaying a pronounced lyrical tendency, and a repertory of autonomous images reminiscent of Pierre Reverdy. During the Axis occupation of Greece during World War II, he participated in the regular meetings hosted by Andreas Embirikos and his wife Matsi Hatzilazarou hold in their house along with Nikos Engonopoulos, Odysseas Elytis, Nikos Gatsos, Miltos Sachtouris, Epameinondas Ch. Gonatas, Ektor Kaknavatos, Nanos Valaoritis, Yorgos V. Makris, among other writers. Being close to Epameinondas Ch. Gonatas and Ektor Kaknavatos, he cultivated the vein of a lyrical surrealism, which after his first two books became increasingly mild, whereas his work assumed explicitly metaphysical overtones from then on.

Papaditsas died in Athens.
