= Stratos Tzortzoglou =

Greek actor

- Born: Stratos Tzortzoglou; 5 August 1965 (age 60); Pireus, Attica, Greece
- Occupations: Actor, writer, director, producer
- Years active: 1987–present
- Children: 1

Stratos Tzortzoglou (Greek: Στράτος Τζώρτζογλου) is a Greek actor. He was discovered by the stage director Karolos Koun in 1987.

== Early life ==
He was born 5 August 1965 in Athens. He studied at Karolos Koun's Art Theater school.

== Awards ==
- National Greek Award, best male actor, Up, Down and Sideways
- Stars De Demain, best supporting actor, Landscape in the Mist

== Filmography ==
=== Television ===
Year	Title	Role(s)	Notes	Ref.
1990	The Striker with Number 9 - The Series	Bill Seretis	Lead role, 6 episodes	
1991	365 days of born	Himself (co-host)	TV special	
1992–1993	The Guardians of Achaea	Zanis Kazianis	Lead role, 40 episodes	
1994	One Wonderful Life	Stefanos Pothos	Lead role, 12 episodes; also co-writer	
1996–1997	The Tide	Ektoras	Lead role, 19 episodes	
1997–1998	Falling Angel	Michalis Ioannou	Lead role, 21 episodes; also co-writer	
1998–1999	The sign of love	Kostas Razis	Lead role, 28 episodes	
1999–2000	In the shadow of war	Goran	Lead role, 20 episodes; also co-writer	
2000–2001	Secretary for crying	Andonis Velissarios	Lead role, 36 episodes	
2001	Secret Ways	Spyros Polidouris	Episode: "Night shift"	
2001–2002	In the way of heart		Lead role, 26 episodes; also co-writer	
2004–2005	Widows' Club	Orestis Bilinis	Lead role, 16 episodes	
2005–2006	The last ruler of the Balkans	Takis	Lead role, 11 episodes	
2008	True Loves	Christos	Episode: "Random meet"	
2008–2010	In red background	Stratos	Lead role, 300 episodes	
2011	The life of the other woman	Andonis	50 episodes	
2012–2014	Waltz with 12 Gods	Nikos	Lead role, 256 episodes	
2013	Montevideo, God Bless You!	Archie	3 episodes	
2019–2020	Unknown Woman	Fotis Venieris	Main role, 234 episodes	
2021	The Farm Greece	Himself (contestant)	Season 3, 40 episodes	
2022–2023	Wild Land	Thomas Zafeiriou	Lead role, 116 episodes	

=== Film ===
Year	Title	Role	Notes	Ref.
1988	Landscape in the Mist	Orestis	film debut	
1988	The Striker with Number 9	Bill Seretis		
1990	Signs of the night	Alkis		
1991	The fugitive	Theofanis		
1992	Up and down and sideways	Stavros		
1995	Ulysses' Gaze			
1996	Towards freedom	Aris		
2000	The Bachelor	Thodoros Dimitriadis		
2002	Ariadne	Alkis Panagiotopoulos		
2007	Douple Date		short film	
2009	Wishes	Stratos		
2010	The Awesome Storm Man'	storm man	short film	
2010	The Bacchae	Dionysus		
2010	Positive Stories	doctor		
2010	37 memories	man		
2011	Cyclops²	Eftichis	short film	
2013	From the Earth to the Moon	Mishel Ardan	voice role	
2014	Just Cause	Mr. Brandon	short film	
2017	Subterranean Love: Ileana & Paul	Dimitru	short film	
2017	The Boogeyman	The Hooded Man	short film	
2018	The Rainbow Experiment	Nicky Kazan		
2018	To See You Smile	Alika	short film	
