= I Farma (Greek TV series) season 3 =

I Farma
- Season 3
- Presented by: Sakis Tanimanidis
- No. of days: 80
- No. of housemates: 22
- Winner: Kostas Grekas
- Runners-up: Vassilis Theodoropoulos; Konstantinos Makris (Doupis); Kyriaki Katsogresaki

Release
- Original network: ANT1
- Original release: March 12 – June 10, 2021

Season chronology
- ← Previous; Season 2 Next → Season 4

The third season of the Greek reality television show I Farma, based on the Swedish television series Farmen and returned after a sixteen-year hiatus in Greece, began airing on March 12, 2021 on ANT1.

Sakis Tanimanidis presented the show. Vassilis Filippou was the caretaker of the Farm.

== Format ==
Fourteen contestants are chosen from the outside world, who declared participation. Each week one contestant is selected the Farmer of the Week, by a leadership race. In the first week, the first farmer to be participating in the race, was chosen by a game. Since week 2, the first farmer to be participating is chosen by the contestant evicted in the previous week. The second farmer to be participating in the race was chosen by the contestants.

=== Nomination process ===
The Farmer of the Week nominates two people (a man and a woman) as the Butlers. After some days, the Farmer of the Week must decide which Butler is the first to go to the Battle. That person then chooses the second person (from the same sex) for the Battle. They have to play 5 games, which each game has from 1 until 5 points. The farmer with the most points wins the Battle and the other farmer is evicted from the game.

== Farmers ==
Ages stated are at time of contest.

| Contestant | Age | Background | Hometown | Entered | Exited | Status | Finish |
|---|---|---|---|---|---|---|---|
| Panagiotis Hatzopoulos | 32 | Cafe owner | Ptolemaida | Day 1 | Day 5 | 1st Evicted; Week 1 | 22nd |
| Maria Thoma | 33 | Actress | Athens | Day 1 | Day 10 | 2nd Evicted; Week 2 | 21st |
| Sofia Pavlidou | 46 | Actress | Athens | Day 1 | Day 14 | Quit; Week 3 | 20th |
| Maria Spyropoulou | 32 | Businessman & Equestrian Coach | Volos | Day 1 | Day 15 | 3rd Evicted; Week 3 | 19th |
| Erotokritos Kymionis | 48 | Fashion designer | Athens | Day 6 | Day 15 | Quit; Week 3 | 18th |
| Maria Fragaki | 38 | Journalist & Radio Producer | Athens | Day 6 | Day 20 | 4th Evicted; Week 4 | 17th |
| Maria Totomi | 40 | Freelancer | Athens | Day 1 | Day 25 | 5th Evicted; Week 5 | 16th |
| Tasos Xiarcho | 28 | Art Director | Athens | Day 24 | Day 33 | Quit; Week 7 | 15th |
| Irini Kollida | 39 | Personal Trainer | Athens | Day 1 | Day 35 | Quit; Week 7 | 14th |
| Vassilis Mantzouranis | 33 | YouTuber | Athens | Day 1 | Day 40 | 7th Evicted; Week 8 | 13th |
| Stratos Tzortzoglou | 55 | Actor & Acting Teacher | Athens | Day 1 | Day 45 | 8th Evicted; Week 9 | 12th |
| Alexandra Panagiotarou | 28 | Fashion blogger | Tripoli | Day 42 | Day 50 | 9th Evicted; Week 10 | 11th |
| Elena Tsikitikou | 33 | Dancer | Naousa | Day 32 | Day 55 | 10th Evicted; Week 11 | 10th |
| Fenia Tsikitikou | 33 | Dancer | Naousa | Day 32 | Day 60 | 11th Evicted; Week 12 | 9th |
| Michalis Iatropoulos | 55 | Actor | Thessaloniki | Day 1 | Day 65 | 12th Evicted; Week 13 | 8th |
| Maria Michalopoulou | 20 | Model & Farmer | Corinth | Day 1 | Day 70 | 13th Evicted; Week 14 | 7th |
| Thanasis Patras | 46 | Presenter & Radio Producer | Karditsa | Day 1 | Day 75 | 14th Evicted; Week 15 | 6th |
| Katia Dede | 34 | Blogger & Photographer | Athens | Day 12 | Day 79 | 15th Evicted; Week 16 | 5th |
| Kyriaki Katsogresaki | 31 | Stewardess & trainee pilot | Crete | Day 1 | Day 80 | Fourth place Week 16 | 4th |
| Konstantinos Makris (Doupis) | 37 | Businessman - Beach Bar owner | Crete | Day 1 | Day 80 | Third place Week 16 | 3rd |
| Vassilis Theodoropoulos | 28 | Electrician | Aigio | Day 1 | Day 80 | Runner Up; Week 16 | 2nd |
| Kostas Grekas | 44 | Businessman - Model | Karditsa | Day 24 | Day 80 | Winner; Week 16 | 1st |

== Nominations ==
| | Week 1 | Week 2 | Week 3 | Week 4 | Week 5 | Week 6 | Week 7 | Week 8 | Week 9 | Week 10 | Week 11 | Week 12 | Week 13 | Week 14 | Week 15 | Week 16 | Final |
|---|---|---|---|---|---|---|---|---|---|---|---|---|---|---|---|---|---|
| Farmer of the Week (Immunity) | Doupis | Maria M. | Thanasis | Vassilis T. | Thanasis | Irini | Vasilis M. | Michalis | Vassilis T. | Kyriaki | Kyriaki | Kyriaki | Vassilis T | Doupis | Kostas | None | |
| Buttlers | Sofia; Thanasis | Vassilis M. Maria Th. | Erotokritos; Maria S. | Maria F. Thanasis | Kyriaki; Doupis | Katia; Vasilis T. | Maria M. Tasos | Maria M. Kostas | Fenia; Stratos | Alexandra; Kostas | Fenia; Vasilis T. | None | | | | | |
| Kostas | Not in The Farm | | | | | | | Butler; 1st Dueler | | Butler | | | 1st Dueler | | Farmer of the Week | Dueler | Winner (Week 16) |
| Vassilis T. | | | | Farmer of the Week | | Butler; 1st Dueler | | | Farmer of the Week | | Butler | | Farmer of the Week | | 1st Dueler | Dueler | Runner Up (Week 16) |
| Doupis | Farmer of the Week | | | | Butler | | | | 2nd Dueler | | | | | Farmer of the Week | | Dueler | Third place (Week 16) |
| Kyriaki | | | | | Butler; 1st Dueler | | | | | Farmer of the Week | Farmer of the Week | Farmer of the Week | | | | Dueler | Fourth place (Week 16) |
| Katia | Not in The Farm | | | 2nd Dueler | | Butler | | | | | | | | 1st Dueler | | Dueler | Evicted (Week 16) |
| Thanasis | Butler; 1st Dueler | | Farmer of the Week | Butler | Farmer of the Week | | | | | | | | | | 2nd Dueler | Evicted (Week 15) | |
| Maria M. | | Farmer of the Week | 2nd Dueler | | | | Butler; 1st Dueler | Butler | | | | 1st Dueler | | 2nd Dueler | Evicted (Week 14) | | |
| Michalis | | | | | | 2nd Dueler | Evicted (Week 6); *Returned (Week 7) | Farmer of the Week | | | | | 2nd Dueler | Evicted (Week 13) | | | |
| Fenia | Not in The Farm | | | | | | | | | Butler | Butler; 1st Dueler | 2nd Dueler | Evicted (Week 12) | | | | |
| Elena | Not in The Farm | | | | | | | | | 2nd Dueler | 2nd Dueler | Evicted (Week 11) | | | | | |
| Alexandra | Not in The Farm | | | | | | | | | Butler; 1st Dueler | Evicted (Week 10) | | | | | | |
| Stratos | | | | | | | | | Butler; 1st Dueler | Evicted (Week 9) | | | | | | | |
| Vassilis M. | | Butler | | | | | Farmer of the Week | 2nd Dueler | Evicted (Week 8) | | | | | | | | |
| Irini | | | | | | Farmer of the Week | 2nd Dueler | Quit (Week 7) | | | | | | | | | |
| Tasos | Not in The Farm | | | | | | Butler | Quit (Week 7) | | | | | | | | | |
| Maria To. | | 2nd Dueler | | | 2nd Dueler | Evicted (Week 5) | | | | | | | | | | | |
| Maria F. | Not in The Farm | | | Butler; 1st Dueler | Evicted (Week 4) | | | | | | | | | | | | |
| Erotokritos | Not in The Farm | | Butler | Quit (Week 3) | | | | | | | | | | | | | |
| Maria S. | | | Butler; 1st Dueler | Evicted (Week 3) | | | | | | | | | | | | | |
| Sofia | Butler | | | Quit (Week 3) | | | | | | | | | | | | | |
| Maria Th. | | Butler; 1st Dueler | Evicted (Week 2) | | | | | | | | | | | | | | |
| Panagiotis | 2nd Dueler | Evicted (Week 1) | | | | | | | | | | | | | | | |
| Quit | None | | Sofia; Erotokritos | None | | | Tasos; *Irini | None | | | | | | | | | |
| 1st Dueler (By Farmer) | Thanasis | Maria Th. | Maria S. | Maria F. | Kyriaki | Vasilis T. | Maria M. | Kostas | Stratos | Alexandra | Fenia | Maria M. | Kostas | Katia | Vasilis T. | None | |
| 2nd Dueler (By 1st Dueler) | Panagiotis | Maria To. | Maria M. | Katia | Maria To. | Michalis | Irini | Vasilis M. | Doupis | Elena | Elena | Fenia | Michalis | Maria M. | Thanasis | None | |
| Evicted | Panagiotis; Lost duel | Maria Th. Lost duel | Maria S. Lost duel | Maria F. Lost Duel | Maria To. Lost Duel | Michalis; Lost Duel | None | Vasilis M. Lost Duel | Stratos; Lost Duel | Alexandra; Lost Duel | Elena; Lost Duel | Fenia; Lost Duel | Michalis; Lost Duel | Maria M. Lost Duel | Thanasis; Lost Duel | Katia; Lost Duel | Kyriaki; Doupis; Vassilis T. Finalist |

Notes

*On Week 7 it was announced that the most popular player of the players that have been evicted, will be returning to the game. Mixalis, who had lost a duel to Vasilis T. returned to the game.

*On week 7 Maria M. and Irini were the two duelers. Irini originally won the duel but Quit so that Maria M. could stay in the game.

== The game ==
| Week | Farmer of the Week | Butlers | 1st Dueler | 2nd Dueler | Evicted | Finish |
|---|---|---|---|---|---|---|
| 1 | Doupis | Sofia; Thanasis | Thanasis | Panagiotis | Panagiotis | 1st Evicted |
| 2 | Maria M. | Vassilis M. Maria Th. | Maria Th. | Maria To. | Maria Th. | 2nd Evicted |
| 3 | Thanasis | Erotokritos; Maria S. | Maria S. | Maria M. | Sofia, Erotokritos | Quit |
| 3 | Thanasis | Erotokritos; Maria S. | Maria S. | Maria M. | Maria S. | 3rd Evicted |
| 4 | Vasilis T. | Maria F. Thanasis | Maria F. | Katia | Maria F. | 4th Evicted |
| 5 | Thanasis | Kyriaki. Doupis | Kyriaki | Maria To. | Maria To. | 5th Evicted |
| 6 | Irini | Katia; Vasilis T. | Vasilis T. | Michalis | Michalis | 6th Evicted but Returned in 7th Week |
| 7 | Vasilis M. | Maria M. Tasos | Maria M. | Irini | Tasos, Irini | Quit |
| 8 | Michalis | Maria M. Kostas | Kostas | Vasilis M. | Vasilis M. | 7th Evicted |
| 9 | Vasilis T. | Fenia; Stratos | Stratos | Doupis | Stratos | 8th Evicted |
| 10 | Kyriaki | Alexandra; Kostas | Alexandra | Elena | Alexandra | 9th Evicted |
| 11 | Kyriaki | Fenia; Vasilis T. | Fenia | Elena | Elena | 10th Evicted |
| 12 | Kyriaki | | Maria M. | Fenia | Fenia | 11th Evicted |
| 13 | Vasilis T. | | Kostas | Michalis | Michalis | 12th Evicted |
| 14 | Doupis | | Katia | Maria M | Maria M. | 13th Evicted |
| 15 | Kostas | | Vasilis T. | Thanasis | Thanasis | 14th Evicted |
