= Mission Box =

Novel by Aris Alexandrou

Schematic illustration similar to those drawn by Aris Alexandrou to describe the route taken by the rebels in his novel "Mission Box". The sketch is not identical to the ones made by the writer; it does not depict the exact route described in the novel.

Mission Box (Greek: Το Κιβώτιο, romanized: To Kivotio, lit. 'the crate') is a political novel by Greek writer Aris Alexandrou, his most known work. It was written from 1966 to 1972 in Paris, where Alexandrou lived in self-exile, following the 1967 coup. The novel was first published in Greek in 1974, by Kedros Publications. It was translated in French by Colette Lust in 1978 and in English by Robert Crist in 1996.

Its plot is set in the Greek Civil War era, and revolves around various related thematic poles. It is considered to be one of the greatest works of 20th-century Greek literature.

== Plot ==
During the final period of the Greek Civil War, following an order from General Headquarters, a group of rebels undertakes to transport a crate of unknown contents to a rebel-held city, passing through enemy territory. They are told that succeeding in delivering the box shall ensure their army's final victory. As the mission unfolds, the team's members perish one after the other.

In the end, only one rebel survives, finally managing to deliver the crate. However, when he arrives at his destination, the box is found to be empty and the rebel is imprisoned by his comrades for sabotage. He then begins to write reports to an anonymous interrogator, without knowing whether the interrogator reads the reports or not; these reports constitute the novel.
