= Miltos Sachtouris =

Greek poet

Miltos Sachtouris (Greek: Μίλτος Σαχτούρης: July 29, 1919, Athens – March 29, 2005, Athens) was a Greek poet. He was a descendant of Georgios Sachtouris, whose origins were the Island of Ydra. When he was young he abandoned his law studies to follow his real passion, poetry, adopting the pen name Miltos Chrysanthis. Sachtouris wrote his first poetry collection, The Music of My Islands, under his pen name in 1941.

== Poetry ==
Sachtouris met Nikos Engonopoulos in 1943. He later worked with Engonopoulos on Ikaros. He began works and continued to pass time at the Brazilian on Voukourestiou Street along with Elytis, Sinopoulos, Vakalo, Papaditsas, Karouzos and others. In 1960, he published When I Talk to you and The Spectres, or Joy on the Other Street. Two years later, he received the Second State Poet Prize in 1962 for The Stigmata. He later wrote The Seal, or The Eighth Moon (1964) and The Utensil (1971) from the publishings of Keimena.

== Personal life ==
He had a long term relationship since 1960 until his death with the artist Gianna Persaki. Gianna Persaki was the creative director in most of his publications after 1960 and he dedicated to her, among many collections, "Skevos" 1971 and several poems including "The Clocks Turned Upside Down". In 2003 Gianna Persaki received the Greek State Prize of Literature on his behalf, a prize that was awarded by the Greek Ministry of Culture and the president of the Hellenic Republic. Accordingly, upon receipt of the award she made a public speech where she also quoted: "Nikos Karouzos is saying that life is a garden which fades away, and Sachtouris is saying life is a short violet".

== Last years and death ==
During his last years of his life he worked on Colorwounds (1980), Ectoplasms (1986), Sinking (1990), Since (1996) and The Clocks Turned Upside Down (1998). He received the Grand State Literature Prize in 2003 for his works. In 1992 the writer Lefteris Xanthopoulos shot a documentary titled Who's the Crazy Hare (The Crazy Hare being one of the poet's most known poems) about Sachtouris at the poet's house, in Kypseli, Athens. That day Lefteris Xanthopoulos asked him who is the Crazy Hare and the poet responded "I am".

The poet died at the age of 85 in Athens on the morning of Tuesday, March 29, 2005 and was buried at the First ('A') Cemetery of Athens. Upon his death the Prime Minister of Greece at that time, Kostas Karamanlis stated: "Miltos Sachtouris was one of the leading poets of Greece and one of the last representatives of a very important era for the Greek poetry. His writing and his constant search of freedom in art and life, accompanied a whole era of adventures and challenges. His work will survive the time. I express my condolences to all of his relatives and close persons". Following that, George Papandreou the leader of the opposition at that time and a former prime minister of Greece stated: "Miltos Sachtouris was one of the greatest Poets of Modern Greece. He served the Greek letters with loyalty, elegance and moral. The global message deriving from his poems is colourful, strong, alive and it is going to thrive and survive throughout the years as our inheritance. I express my sincere condolences to all his relatives and friends". Karolos Papoulias the president of the Hellenic Republic, expressed his condolences about the death of Miltos Sachtouris by saying: "Miltos Sachtouris is the poet who opened and lifted the horizons with his global recognition as a Greek poet".

== Translations ==
His work has been translated and published in several languages including English, French, German, Russian, Polish, Italian, Spanish, Dutch. There are some translations of his work in English including The Forgotten Woman.

== Works ==
- The Music of My Islands (Η Μουσική των Νησιών μου, 1941)
- Christmas '43 (Χριστούγεννα '43, 1944)
- The Forgotten Woman (Η Λησμονημένη, 1945)
- The Heroine (Η Ηρωίδα, 1947)
- The Wounded Woman (Η Πληγωμένη, 1947)
- Death (Ο Θάνατος, 1947)
- The Battle (Η Μάχη, 1947)
- Paralogais (Παραλογαίς, 1948)
- With the Face on the Wall (Με το Πρόσωπο στον Τοίχο, 1952)
- When I Talk to you (Όταν σας Μιλώ, 1956)
- The Spectres, or Joy on the Other Street (Τα Φάσματα, η Η Χαρά στον Άλλο Δρόμο, 1958)
- The Walk (Ο Περίπατος, 1960)
- The Stigmata (Τα Στίγματα, 1962)
- The Seal, or The Eighth Moon (Σφραγίδα, ή Η Όγδοη Σελήνη, 1964)
- The Utensil (Το Σκεύος, 1971)
- Poems 1945-1981 (Ποιήματα 1945-1981, 1977)
- Colorwounds (Χρωμοτραύματα, 1980)
- Ectoplasms (Εκτοπλάσματα, 1986)
- Sinking (Καταβύθιση, 1990)
- Since (Έκτοτε, 1996)
- Voice from the Other Shore (Φωνή απ' την Άλλη Ακρογυαλιά, 1997)
- The Clocks Turned Upside Down (Ανάποδα Γυρίσαν τα Ρολόγια, 1998)
- Poems 1980-1998 (Ποιήματα 1980-1998, 2002)
- "Diavazo" lit. magazine (λογ. περιοδικό "Διαβάζω", January 2003)

== Translations ==
- Selected Poems, tr. K. Friar (1982)
