= Dimosthenis Kourtovik =

Greek writer (born 1948)

- Born: 15 July 1948 (age 78); Athens, Greece
- Occupations: Writer, literary critic, anthropologist
- Writing career
- Period: 1979–present

Dimosthenis Kourtovik (Greek: Δημοσθένης Κούρτοβικ; born 15 July 1948) is a Greek writer, literary critic and anthropologist. He studied biology in Athens and West Germany and specialized later in physical anthropology. In 1986 he obtained a doctoral degree from the University of Wroclaw, Poland, with a thesis on the evolution of human sexuality.

He has plied several occupations, from night watchman to university teaching, from translator to film and literary critic. In the period 1973–75 he was co-founder, director and actor of the "Greek Workers' Stage" in Stuttgart, Germany. Between 1990 and 1995, he taught at the University of Crete the subjects of history of human sexuality, sexual semiotics in art and animal behaviour. Until 2017, he worked as literary critic for the Athens daily 'Ta Nea'.

He has published until now 21 books (novels, short stories, essays, reviews, aphorisms, literary dictionaries, scientific treatises and textbooks). He also has translated 63 books from eight foreign languages (English, German, French, Italian, Finnish, Swedish, Danish and Norwegian). Several of his novels and short stories were translated into German, French, English, Danish, Swedish, Czech, Romanian, Serbian, Bulgarian, Hebrew, and Polish.

The following versions of his name also occur in other languages: Demosthenes Kourtovik, Dimosthenis Kurtovik, Demosthenes Kurtovik, Démosthène Kourtovik.

He lives on the island of Aegina.

== Works ==
=== Prose ===
- Τρεις χιλιάδες χιλιόμετρα (Three Thousand Kilometers), short stories, 1980
- Ο τελευταίος σεισμός (The Last Earthquake), novel, 1985
- Το ελληνικό φθινόπωρο της ΄Εβα-Ανίτα Μπένγκτσον (The Greek Autumn of Eva-Anita Bengtsson), novel, 1987
- Η σκόνη του γαλαξία (Galaxy Dust), novel, 1991
- Η νοσταλγία των δράκων (The Nostalgia of Dragons), novel, 2000
- Το άλλο μονοπάτι (The Other Path), short stories, 2007
- Τι ζητούν οι βάρβαροι (What the Barbarians Are Asking For), novel, 2008
- Λαχανόρυζο του Σταυρού (Post Summer Delights), short stories, 2012
- Ο ήχος της σιωπής της (The Sound of her Silence), novel, 2024

Moreover, several short stories are included in theme anthologies or published in newspapers.

=== Essays, aphorisms, literary criticism ===
- Ημεδαπή εξορία (Exiled in the Native Country), essays and reviews, 1991
- Αντιλεξικό νεοελληνικής χρηστομάθειας (Anti-lexicon of Modern Greek Chrestomathy), aphorisms, 1994
- Έλληνες μεταπολεμικοί συγγραφείς (Greek Postwar Writers), guide, 1995
- Τετέλεσται (It Is Accomplished), essays on photographic documents, 1996
- Στις καθυστερήσεις του ημιχρόνου (In the Extra Time of the First Half), essays and aphorisms, 1999
- Η θέα πέρα από τον ακάλυπτο (The View Beyond the Lightshaft), essays and reviews, 2002
- Ελληνικό hangover (Greek Hangover), essays, 2005
- Η νοσταλγία της πραγματικότητας (Longing for the Reality), essays and reviews, 2015
- Το Νέο Αντιλεξικό νεοελληνικής χρηστομάθειας (The New Anti-lexicon of Modern Greek Chrestomathy), aphorisms, 2019
- Η ελιά και η φλαμουριά (The Olive and the Lime), a panorama of Greek literature 1974-2020, 2021
- Σκοντάφτοντας σε ανοιχτά σύνορα (Stumbling Over Open Borders), a discussion with the writer Kostas Katsoularis, 2023

=== Treatises ===
- Η ελληνική διανόηση στον κινηματογράφο (Greek Intellectuals as Filmmakers), 1979
- Η εξέλιξη της ανθρώπινης σεξουαλικότητας (The Evolution of Human Sexuality), doctoral dissertation, 1986
- Συγκριτική ψυχολογία (Ηθολογία) (Animal Behaviour), 1994

=== Translations ===
Among the 63 books, both fiction and non-fiction, that he has translated are works by Daniel Defoe, Johann Wolfgang von Goethe, E.T.W Hoffmann, Lord Byron, Giacomo Leopardi, Edgar Allan Poe, Jules Verne, Algernon Blackwood, Bertolt Brecht, Daphne Du Maurier, Karel Čapek, Jens Bjørneboe, Veijo Meri, Eeva Kilpi, Martti Joenpolvi, Erich Fried, Wolf Biermann, Julian Barnes, Peter Høeg et al. He has also edited anthologies of German short stories, Finnish short stories and Finnish poetry, and he has translated poems of Desmond Egan, Inger Christensen, Henrik Nordbrandt, and Doris Kareva. Non-fiction authors translated by him include Ibn Khaldun, Max Weber, Walter Benjamin, Egon Friedell, Werner Heisenberg, John Maynard Smith, Siegfried Kracauer, Paul Klee, Herbert Marcuse, Ernest Borneman, Hans-Georg Beck, E.J.Hobsbawm and many others.

== His works in translation ==
In French:

- Poussière d’ étoiles, translator: Jasmine Pipart, Hatier, 1994
- La Nostalgie des Dragons, translator: Caroline Nicolas, Actes Sud, 2004

In German:

- Der griechische Herbst der Eva-Anita Bengtsson, translator: Gaby Wurster, Dialogos, 1989
- Griechische Schriftsteller der Gegenwart, translator: Doris Wille, Romiosini, 2000
- Die Mumie des Ibykus (Die Nostalgie der Drachen), translator: Gaby Wurster, Reclam-Leipzig, 2002
- “Der andere Pfad”, translator: Sophia Georgallidis, in: Niki Eideneier, Sophia Georgallidis (ed.), Die Erben des Odysseus, dtv, 2001
- “Und trotzdem”, translator: Maria Petersen, in the journal Metaphora, Nr 7, 2001
- “Physalia kalliauchen”, translator: Sophia Georgallidis, in: Sophia Georgallidis (ed.), Ausflug mit Freundinnen, Romiosini, 2002

In English:

- It Is Accomplished (excerpt), translated by the author, in: Greek Writers Today, Hellenic Authors’ Society, 2003
- “The Other Footpath”, translator: David Connolly, in: David Connolly (ed.), The Dedalus Book of Greek Fantasy, Dedalus, 2004

In Danish:

- Eva-Anita Bengtssons græske efterår, translator: Vibeke Espholm, Husets Forlag, Århus, 1995

In Swedish:

- Eva-Anita Bengtssons grekiska höst, translator: Cecilia Wedmark, Aegis Förlag, Lund, 1998

In Czech

- “Druha cesta”, translator: Alexandra Buchler, in: Alexandra Buchler (ed.), Cerne olivy, Apsida, 2000

In Romanian:

- Nostalgia demonilor, translator: Elena Lazar, Editura Omonia, 2001

In Serbian:

- Nostalgija zmajeva, translator: Gaga Rosić, Prosveta, 2003

In Bulgarian:

- “И все пақ”, translator: Здравка Миҳайлова, in: Да oпoзнaeм своймe сүседи, Центар за Образователни Инициативи, 2002
- Носталгията иа змейовете, translator: Здравка Михайлова, Балкани, 2007

In Hebrew:

- Η νοσταλγία των δράκων, translator: Amir Tsukerman, Tel Aviv, Keter, 2012

In Polish:

- A jednak, translator: Dorota Jędraś, nowogreckablog.wordpress.com, 2016
