= Oi frouroi tis Achaias =

Oi frouroi tis Achaias (Greek: Οι φρουροί της Αχαΐας, "The Guardians of Achaea") is a Greek popular television series that was broadcast on Mega Channel in 1992. It is an adaptation of a novel of the academician Tasos Athanasiadis and ran for 40 episodes. The directing was done by Giannis Diamantopoulos. The show stars Mimi Denissi, Stratos Tzortzoglou, Anna Synodinou, Katerina Chelmi, Nikos Garyfallou, Vladimiros Kiriakidis, Babis Hatzidakis, Kostas Triantafyllopoulos, Thomas Kindynis, Christoforos Papakaliatis, Akindynis Gkikas and many more.
