= Gynaika choris onoma =

- Genre: Daily drama Sociable
- Based on: Unknown Woman
- Written by: Maria Georgiadou; Konstantinos Ganosis
- Directed by: Viky Manoli; Linos Christodoulou
- Starring: Marianna Toumasatou; Ntora Makrygianni; Kostas Kazanas; Tamila Koulieva; Panos Natsis; Thanasis Patriarcheas
- Theme music composer: Kim & Dimitris Karatzas
- Country of origin: Greece
- Original language: Greek
- No. of seasons: 2
- No. of episodes: 348

Production
- Production locations: Athens, Greece
- Camera setup: Multi-camera
- Running time: 40-45 minutes
- Production company: Pedio Productions

Original release
- Network: ANT1; Alpha TV Cyprus
- Release: September 17, 2018 – July 20, 2020

Gynaika choris onoma (English: Woman with no name) is a Greek daily drama television series, produced from 2018 to 2020, which was broadcast by the television stations ANT1 and Alpha Cyprus.

The main plot of the series is based on the South Korean series "Unknown Woman" which was broadcast in 2017 on the television network KBS2. The adaptation of the script into Greek was undertaken by Maria Georgiadou and Konstantinos Ganosis, while the direction was undertaken by Linos Christodoulou and Viky Manoli.

The first episode of the series was broadcast on September 17, 2018. In May 2019, the series was renewed for a second season. The premiere of the second season took place on September 16, 2019. The series concluded with the end of the second season on Friday, July 10, 2020.

== Plot ==
Katia is desperately looking for a compatible donor to save her 10-year-old son. Marina is the only compatible donor but discovers that she is pregnant and that it is impossible to help Katia, who uses every means to force her. In order to escape and save her baby, Marina, now betrayed by her love, Kostis, fabricates her guilt and is sentenced as the "Woman Without a Name" for a murder she never committed. She gives birth to her daughter safely in prison and names her Elpida.

Katia will lose the child and makes it her life's purpose to find Marina and make her pay with the same coin, to deprive herself of her own child forever and finally succeeds. Then, Marina, with the help of her fellow prisoner, Martha, will get out of prison. Determined to go to the extreme, she transforms into an equal opponent, with a different name and appearance, returning to Katia's life and all those who hurt her, with the aim of destroying them. The two women will face each other and hatred will lead them to the most dangerous and cruel paths.

== Cast ==
- Marianna Toumasatou as Katia Makri-Eleftheriou
- Ntora Makrygianni as Marina Antoniadou/Nantia Petridou
- Tamila Koulieva as Martha Petridou
- Alexandros Stavrou as Argyris Rizos
- Stratos Tzortzoglou as Fotis Venieris
- Kostas Kazanas as Dimitris Makris
- Evaggelia Moumouri as Ria Anagnostou
- Kostas Falelakis as Nikos Georgiou
- Alexandra Tavoulari as Elli Makri
- Markella Giannatou as Rena Nikolaou
- Thanasis Patriarcheas as Michalis Makris
- Panos Natsis as Kostis Anagnostou
- Efthymis Georgopoulos as Gerasimos Chatzis
- Antonis Vlontakis as Antreas Pappas
- Konstantinos Antalopoulos as Nasos Petridis
- Ivan Svitailo as Aris
- Giorgos Makris as Miltos Anagnostou
- Sofia Priovolou as Sofia Anagnostou
- Giannis Athitakis as Giorgos Alexiou
- Danai Skiadi as Ioanna Tsoukala
- Erietta Manouri as Kleio Georgiou
