= Elisavet Spathari =

Greek archaeologist

Elisavet (or Elisabet or Elsi) Spathari (Greek: Ελισάβετ Σπαθάρη) is a Greek archaeologist and author. She is Honorary Director Emeritus of Ministry of Culture in Greece and has written several books about Ancient Greece.

In 2002, Spathari helped the Nemea Valley Archaeological Project, sponsored by Bryn Mawr College, an archeological survey and excavation of Tsoungiza on Peloponnese.

== Works ==
- Olympic Spirit, 1992
- Αρμενίζοντας στο χρόνο – Sailing Through Time: The Ship in Greek Art (translated to English), 1995
- Ο Ζαχαρίας και ο κόσμος, 1999
- Ναύπλιο, Παλαμήδι, 2000
- Αρχαία ελληνικά θέατρα, 2000
- Το ολυμπιακό πνεύμα, 2001
- Μυκήνες, 2001
- Ευ αγωνίζεσθαι, 2004
- Αχιλλέας Κομίνος, ο μεγάλος περίπατος, 2005
- Κόρινθος, Μυκήνες, Τύρινθα, Επίδαυρος – Corinth, Mycenae, Tiryns, Epidauros (translated to English, French, Spanish, Portuguese, Italian, German and Russian), 2008
- Ελληνική μυθολογία – Greek Mythology (translated to English, German, French, Italian, Spanish and Russian), 2010 and reprint 2012
- Ναύπλιο Πρωτεύουσα Πόλη – Nafplio Capital City (translated to English), 2020

=== Collective works ===
- Αρχαία Ολυμπία – Olympie antique (translated to French), 2004
- Αθήνα – Σπάρτη, 2007
- Δημοκρατία και η μάχη του Μαραθώνα – Democracy and the Battle of Marathon (translated to English), 2010
- Αρχαιολογία: Πελοπόννησος, 2012
