= Tatiana Gritsi-Milliex =

Greek novelist and journalist

Tatiana Gritsi-Milliex (Greek: Τατιάνα Γκρίτση-Μιλλιέξ; 1920 – 14 February 2005) was a Greek novelist and journalist.

== Biography ==
Gritsi-Milliex was born in Athens and studied at the University of Athens, but quit her studies after a short time. She went on to study French and phonetics at the French institute where she met her husband Roger Milliex (4 July 1913 – 7 July 2006), and with whom she had two children.

During the Axis occupation of Greece she became a volunteer for the Greek Red Cross.

The Milliex couple left for France in 1945 and returned to the Kingdom of Greece in 1947, when Roger Milliex became director of studies in the French Institute.

They remained in Athens until 1959, where Tatiana worked in the center of Asia Minor studies, while participating in various painting exhibitions throughout Greece, while intensifying her writing work.

From 1959 until 1971 the couple lived in Cyprus, since Mr. Milliex was transferred to the Cypriot French institute.

Later they left for Genoa, Italy. During the Greek military junta of 1967–1974, Tatiana lost her Greek citizenship, and thus she joined the anti-junta campaign.

They returned to Greece during the Metapolitefsi. Tatiana worked for EIR (1974–1975), 1983–1984) and ERT2 (Ellinikí Radiofonía Tileórasi) (1984–1985).

As a journalist and critic she worked with many newspapers and magazines. She was a member of the Rakina Academy in Paris, a founding member of the Company of Writers, member of the Company of Greek Novelists, of Pen Club, of the Greek Literature and Historical Archive and many more.

She was honoured with the Greek state prize, the Prize of the 12, the state prize of novel writing and the prize of the Athens Academy.

She died in Athens,

== Sources ==
- Παγκόσμιο Βιογραφικό Λεξικό vol. 6, Ekdotiki Athinon.
