= George Pol Papadakis =

Greek poet, writer and mathematician

George Pol. Papadakis is a Greek poet, writer and mathematician who was born in Athens. He also deals with literary criticism.

== Career ==
Papadakis is a secondary education teacher in Computer Science, and has also taught in institutes of vocational training. He is a member of the Greek Literary Society and received a prize in prose writing from the Literary Society Parnassos in 2002.

As a researcher he is engaged in the area of “Entexno” Greek popular music. He also writes verses, some of which set to music by Greek composers including Joseph Benakis and Chrysanthos Mouzakitis. Papadakis was Associate Editor of the literary journal Pnevmatiki Zoi (Athens Academy Award – 2002) until 2018.

== Works ==
- (2001) Anthologia Poiisis. (A Poetry Anthology) Athens: Pnevmatiki Zoi.
- (2001) Enas Peripatos stin Amorgo tou Nikou Gatsou. (A Stroll in Nikos Gatsos's Amorgos, Essay) Athens: Pnevmatiki Zoi.
- (2001) Sta Balkonia tou Ouranou. (At Heaven's Balconies, Poetry) Athens: Pnevmatiki Zoi.
- (2003) Anthologia Poiisis. (A Poetry Anthology) Athens: Pnevmatiki Zoi.
- (2003) To Iparchon Fos. (The Existing Light, Poetry) Athens.
- (2005) Oi Dromoi tou Fantastikou. (The Roads of Fantasy Literature, Stories – Essays) Athens: Oxy.
- (2007) Sto Likofos ton Kairon. (In the Twilight of Times, Poetry) Athens: Oxy.
- (2007) Tromos kai Fantasia. (Terror and Fantasy, Comics on Fantasy Literature) Athens: Psichis ta Lampirismata.
- (2007) “To Nekronomikon”, Apagorevmena Vivlia (Forbidden Books) Athens: Archetipo, pp. 75–81.
- (2007) Akatonomastes Exomologiseis. (Unutterable Confessions, Psychological Atmospheric Horror) Athens: Oxy.
- (2007) O Mplek kai oi alloi. (Bleck and the Others, Studies on 70s Comics) Athens: Periodikos Typos.
- (2007) “Takis Varvitsiotis”, in Timi ston Taki Varvitsioti (A Tribute to Takis Varvitsiotis, Texts on his poetic Work), Various Authors. Thessaloniki: Bibis.
- (2008) “Giati i Poiisi”, 27th symposium of poetry. Patras: Ekdoseis Peri Texnikon.
- (2008) “Ti Akrivos Einai I Tetarti Diastasi” (What Exactly Does The Fourth Dimension Stand For), “Sxetika me to Apeiro” (Issues Related To The Infinity), “Poso Efikto Einai Ena Taxidi ston Xrono” (Is Travelling Through Time An Attainable Objective?), “Oi Neoteres Theories Xronometaforas”, “I Ekpliktiki Xronomixani tou Kathigiti Ronald Malett” (Professor Ronald Malett's Amazing Time Machine) (All Works on the issue of time travelling and the fourth dimension), in Tetarti Diastasi kai Taxidia ston Xrono, Various Authors. Thessaloniki: Arxetypo.
- (2008) The Little Runaways and the House in the Woods (Opera for Children). Montreal and Athens: ChromaMusika and Ekdoseis Hadjilakos.
- (2010) "Tasos Falkos, Synoptiki parousiasi tou ergou tou", in Tasos Falkos Arvanitakis, Peninta Chronia Dimiourgias (Collective Volume) Thessaloniki: DIK.
- (2011) Simandro Afipnisis. (A Gong of Awakening), Poetry. Athens: Pnevmatiki Zoi.
- (2011) Fos sti Siopi. (Light in Silence), Poetry. Athens: Pnevmatiki Zoi.
- (2012) Matomenos Erotas. (Bloody Love), Novel. Athens: Dromon.
- (2012) 70 '80 Ta periodika pou agapisame. (The Magazines we Loved, Study) Athens.
- (2013) Mou Eipan. (They talk to me), Interviews. Athens: Dromon.
- (2013) Dokimia ston Evropaiko Politismo, (Essays in European Culture). Athens: Dromon.
- (2014) Nea Atrapos,(New Path). Poetry Athens: Difros.
- (2015) Kostas Davourlis O Pele tis Evropis, (Costas Davourlis, A Pele in Europe). Study, Athens: Dromon.
- (2015) Iroes tou Steliou Anemodoura, (Heros of Stelios Anemodouras). Study, Athens:Mikros Iros.
- (2016) O Manolis Pratikakis sto fos tiw dialektikis, (Manolis Pratikakis of the light of dialectics). Athens: Kedros
- (2017) Gia ton Antoni Fostieri: Kritika Keimena (Critical Texts on Antonis Fostieri, Collective volume). Nicosia: Aigaion Editions, p. 333.
- (2017) Laxeftis Topion, (Landscape Carver) Poetry. Athens: Difros.
- (2019) Draculas, i eksomologisi toy, (The confession of Dracula), horror comic. Athens: Dromon.
- (2022) Grigoris bithikotsis, O tragoudistis ton ellinon, (Grigoris Bithikotsis, the singer of the Greeks), study. Athens: Dromon.
- (2023) 15 Vimata stin Avysso. (15 Steps into the Abyss, Short Stories) Athens: Moraitis.
- (2024) Ennea Koryfaioi Ellines Podosfairistes. (Nine Top Greek Football Players, Study) Athens: Dromon.
- Συνομιλία με τον Σωτήρη Σόρογκα (Στο: Σωτήρης Σόρογκας, Διάλογοι). Αθήνα: Εκδόσεις Καστανιώτη, 2024, σελ. 145–153. ISBN 978-960-03-7353-0.
- (2025) Smileftis tou Arritou. (Carver of the Unspoken, Poetry) Athens: Difros.
- (2026) "Antonis Fostieris", interview in Collective Volume Antonis Fostieris, Poiisi kai Poiitiki, Synomilies Monologoi. Athens: Kastaniotis.
