= Kostas Karyotakis =

Greek poet (1896–1928)

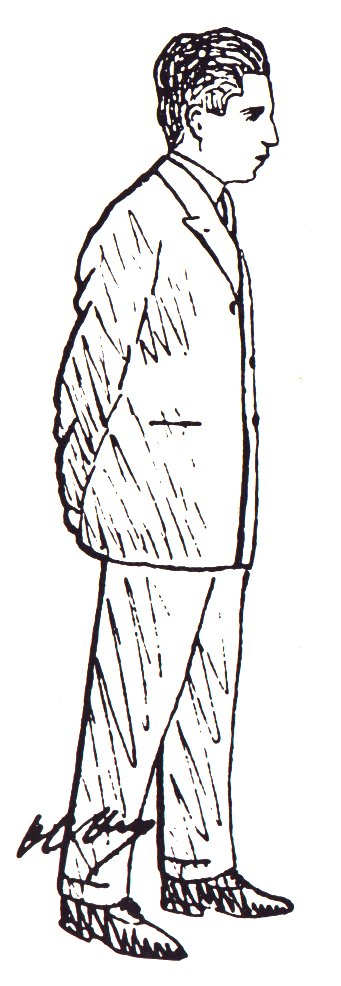
Kostas Karyotakis, self-portrait

Kostas Karyotakis (/kæriəˈtækɪs/; Greek: Κώστας Καρυωτάκης [karʝioˈtakis]; 11 November (OS October 30), 1896 – 20 July 1928) is considered one of the most representative Greek poets of the 1920s and one of the first poets to use iconoclastic themes in Greece.

His poetry conveys a great deal of nature, imagery and traces of expressionism and surrealism. He also belongs to the Greek Lost Generation movement. The majority of Karyotakis' contemporaries viewed him in a dim light throughout his lifetime without a pragmatic accountability for their contemptuous views; for after his suicide, the majority began to revert to the view that he was indeed a great poet. He had a significant, almost disproportionately progressive influence on later Greek poets.

== Biography ==
Karyotakis gave existential depth as well as a tragic dimension to the emotional nuances and melancholic tones of the neo-Symbolist and neo-Romantic poetry of the time. He captures and conveys with poetic daring the climate of dissolution and the impasses of his generation, as well as the traumas of his own inner spiritual world.

=== Early life ===
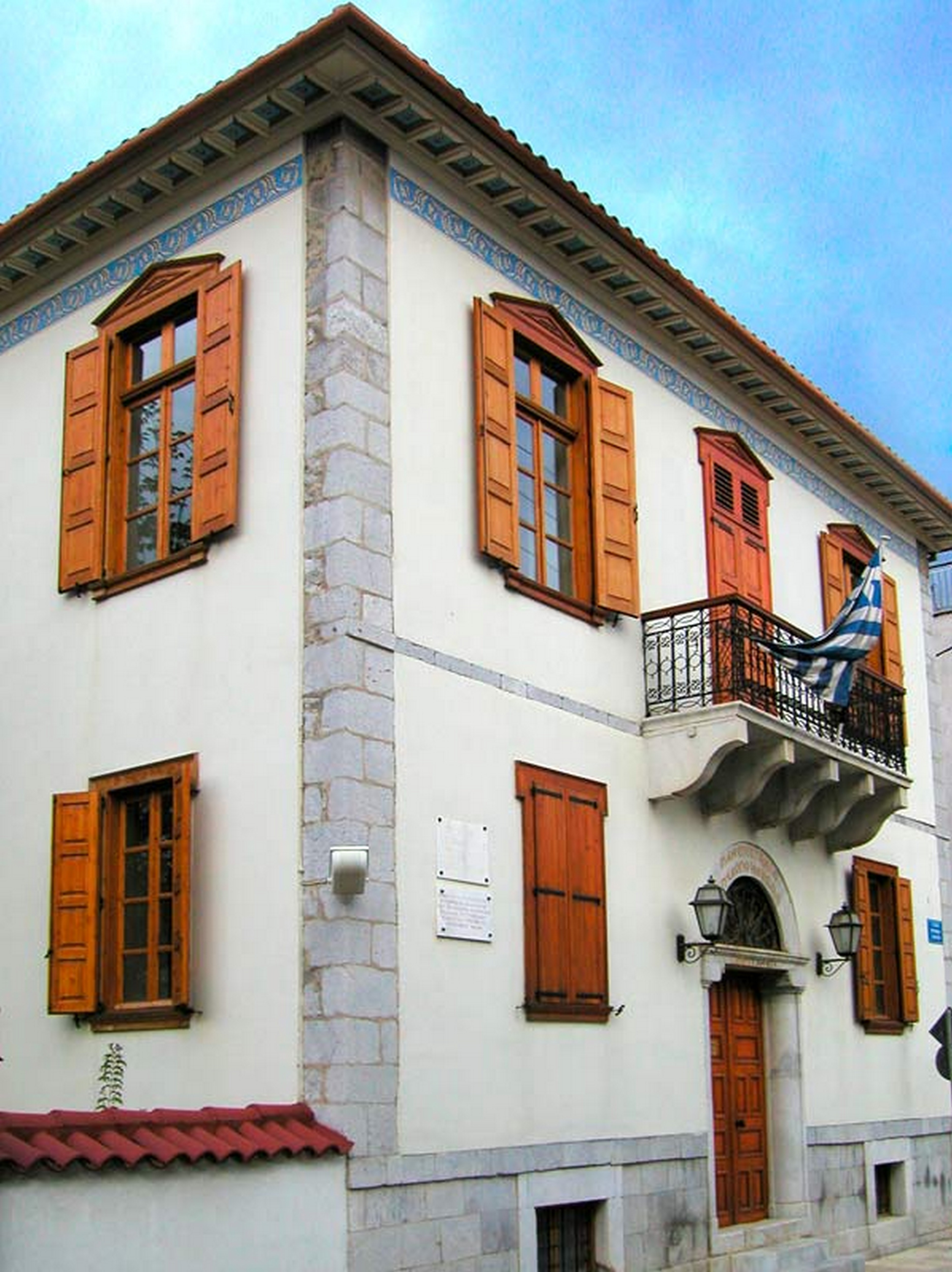
The poet's birthplace in Tripoli

Karyotakis was born in Tripoli, Greece, his father's occupation as a county engineer resulted in his early childhood and teenage years being spent in various places, following his family's successive moves around the Greek cities, including Argostoli, Lefkada, Larisa, Kalamata, Athens and Chania. He started publishing poetry in various magazines for children in 1912. It is solely rife speculation that he had felt deeply betrayed that a girl he had cared for in Hania in 1913 had married and sent him into melancholy.

After receiving his degree from the Athens School of Law and Political Sciences, in 1917, he did not pursue a career as a lawyer. Karyotakis became a clerk in the Prefecture of Thessaloniki. However, he greatly disliked his work and could not tolerate the bureaucracy of the state, which he wrote about often in his poems. His prose piece Catharsis ('purification') is characteristic of this. For this reason, he would often be removed from his posts and transferred to other locations in Greece. During these removals, he became familiar with the boredom and misery of the country during World War I.

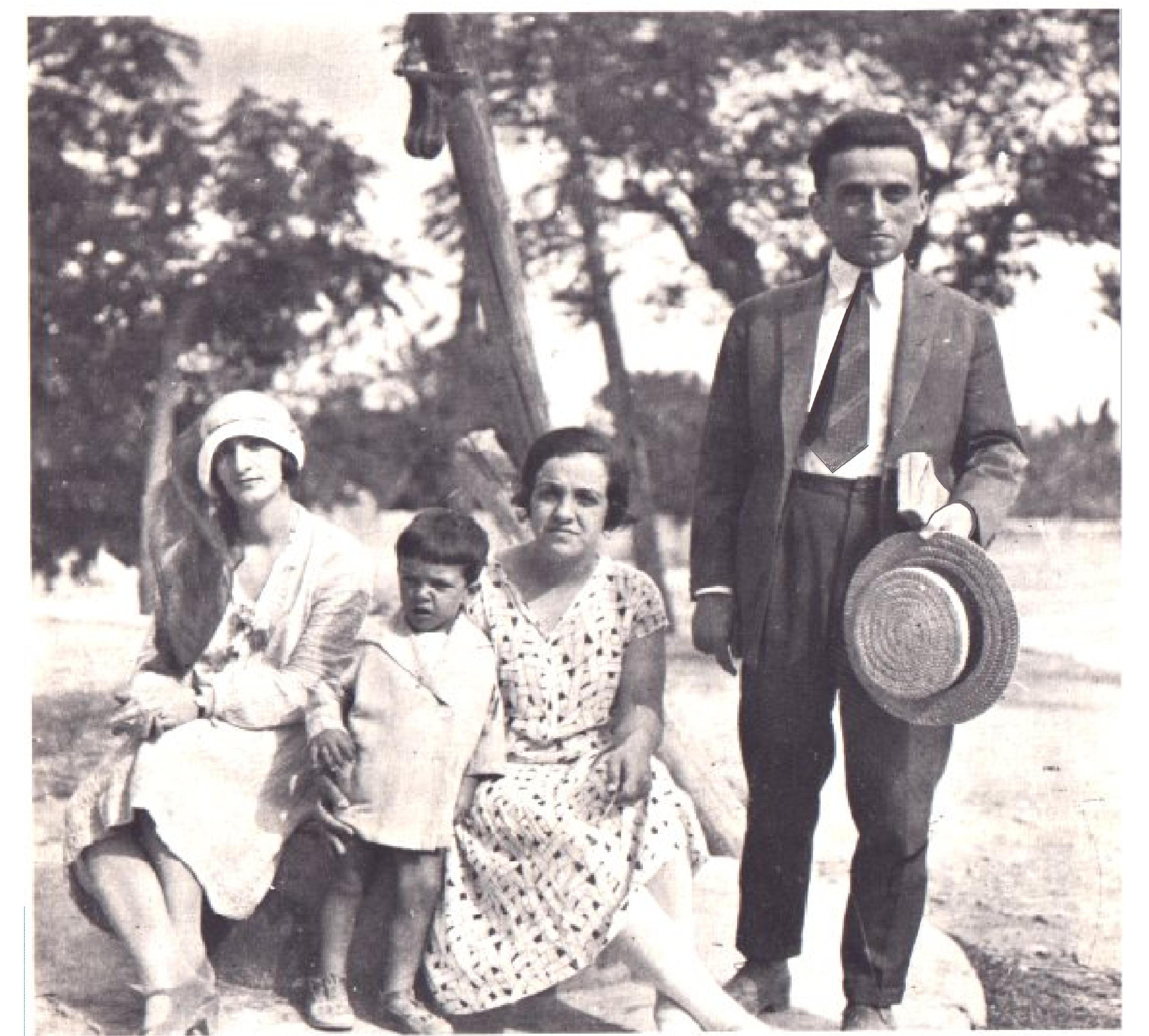
Kostas Karyotakis in Sykia village of Corinth, with his sister, nephew, and his brother's sister-in-law, year 1927

=== Adulthood and career ===
In February 1919, he published his first collection of poetry: The Pain of People and of Things (Greek: Ὁ πόνος τοῦ ἀνθρώπου καὶ τῶν πραμάτων), which was largely ignored or badly reviewed by the critics. In the same year, he published, with his friend Agis Levendis, a satirical review, called The Leg, which, despite its success, was banned by the police after the sixth issue. In 1921 he published his second collection called Nepenthe (Greek: Νηπενθῆ) and also wrote a musical revue, Pell-Mell (Greek: Πελ-Μελ). In 1922, he began having an affair with the poet Maria Polydouri who was a colleague of his at the Prefecture of Attica. In 1923 he wrote a poem called "Treponema pallidum" (Greek: Ὠχρὰ Σπειροχαίτη), which was published under the title "Song of Madness" and gave rise to speculation that he may have been suffering from syphilis, which before 1945 was considered a chronic illness with no proven cure for it.

George Skouras, a physician of the poet, wrote: "He was sick, he was syphilitic" and George Savidis (1929–1999), professor of the Aristotle University of Thessaloniki, who possessed the largest archive about Greek poets, revealed that Karyotakis was syphilitic, and that his brother, Thanasis Karyotakis, thought the disease to be a disgrace to the family. In 1924 he traveled abroad, visiting Italy and Germany. In December 1927, he published his last collection of poetry: Elegy and Satires (Greek: Ἐλεγεῖα καὶ Σάτιρες). In February 1928, Karyotakis was transferred to Patras, although soon afterwards he spent a month on leave in Paris and, in June 1928, he was sent yet again to Preveza by ship.

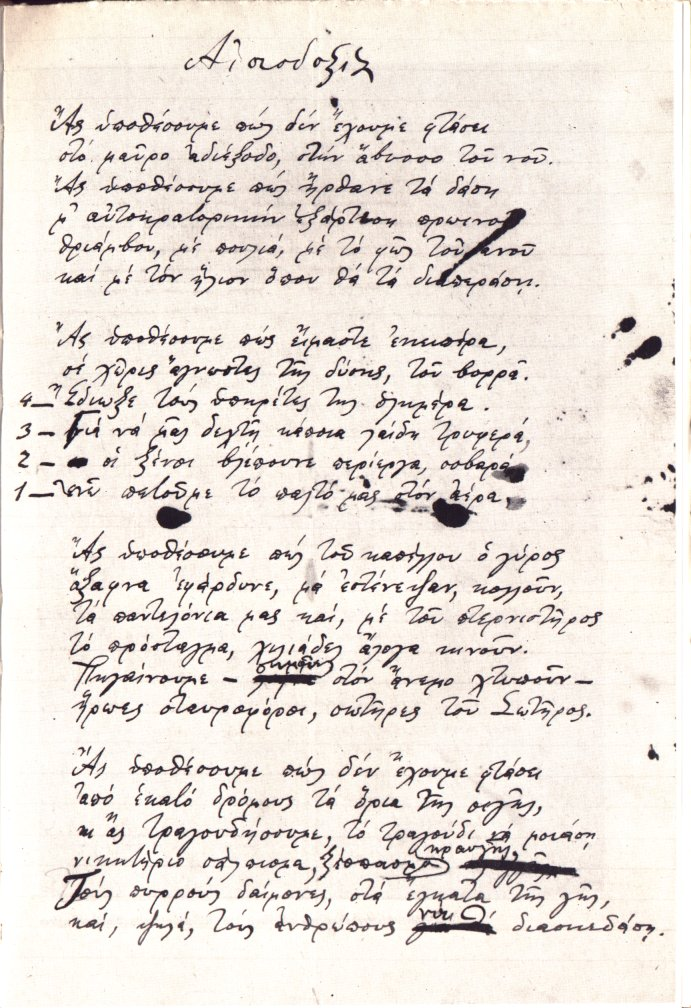
Optimism, hand written manuscript by Kostas Karyotakis

== Suicide ==
Karyotakis lived in Preveza only for 33 days, until his suicide there on 21 July 1928 at age 31. His work was in the Prefecture of Preveza, in the Palios mansion, 10 Speliadou Street, as a lawyer for control of land donations from the State to refugees from the Asia Minor War of 1922. From Preveza, he sent desperate letters to friends and relatives describing the misery he felt in the town. His family offered to support him for an indefinite stay in Paris, but he refused, knowing what a monetary sacrifice like this would entail for them. His angst is felt in the poem "Preveza" (Greek: Πρέβεζα), which he wrote shortly before his suicide. The poem displays an insistent, lilting anaphora on the word Death, which stands at the beginning of several lines and sentences.

An intense preoccupation with mortality permeates the poem. Against the backdrop of the stifling mediocrity Karyotakis perceived, death is measured through trivial details, such as black pecking birds or a town policeman inspecting a disputed weight, futile street names commemorating past battles, a Sunday brass band, a modest bank balance, balcony flowers, a newspaper-reading teacher, or a perfect arriving by ferry. As the final of the six symmetrical quatrains laments: 'If only one of those men would fall dead out of disgust.'

On 19 July 1928, Karyotakis went to Monolithi beach and kept trying to drown in the sea for ten hours, but failed in his attempt, because he was an avid swimmer, as he himself wrote in his suicide note. In the subsequent morning, he returned home and left again to purchase a revolver and went to a little café in the place Vryssoula (near today's Hotel Zikas). After smoking for a few hours, and drinking cherry juice, he left 75 drachmas as a gratuity, while the cost of the drink was 5 drachmas, he went to Agios Spyridon, where, under a eucalyptus tree, he shot himself through the heart. His suicide letter was found in his pocket:

It is time for me to reveal my tragedy. My greatest faults were unbridled curiosity, a diseased imagination, and my attempts to become acquainted with every emotion without being able to feel most of them. However, I despise the base act that is attributed to me. I experienced but the ideation of its atmosphere, the ultimate bitterness. Nor am I the suitable person for that profession. My entire past will show that much. Every reality to me was repulsive.

I felt the rush brought on by danger. And with glad heart I shall accept the coming danger.

P.S. And, to change the tone: I advise those who can swim never to try to commit suicide in the sea. All night and for ten hours I was battered by the waves. I drank much water but, by and again and without me knowing how, my mouth would surface. Perhaps some time, given the opportunity, I shall write down the impressions of a drowning man."

One of his most famous poems is "Preveza", about the place where he committed suicide.

Death is the bullies bashing
against the black walls and roof tiling,
death is the women being loved
as if onion peeling.

Death the squalid, unimportant streets
with their glamorous and pompous names,
the olive-grove, the surrounding sea, and even
the sun, death among all other deaths.

...

If at least, among these people,
one would die of sheer disgust
silent, bereaved, with humble manners,
at the funeral we'd all have fun.

== Works ==
=== Poems and collections ===
- Xeprovodisma (1919) published in «Noumas» (638)
- When you Came... (1919) published in «Noumas» (650)
- Your Letters (1920) published in «Noumas» (671)
- The Pain of Men and Things (1919)
- Nepenthe (1921)
- Song (1922) published in «Pharos» (82)
- Lycabettus ( 1922) published in «Noumas» (765)
- Treponema pallidum (1923) published in «New Life» (322)
- the Ash beyond the Horizon... (1923) published in «Noumas» (771)
- Varium et Mutabile (1923)) published in «Easter Anthology, 1923 (together with one of his friends Agis Leventis).
- Escape (1923) published in «New Life» (324)
- Prepare (1923) published in «Espero» (3)
- Elegies and Satires (1927) published by printing press "Αthena"
- Optimism (1929) [Posthumously] «Nea Estia» (6, 63)
- Sunday (1929) [Posthumously] published in «Pnoe» (1)
- Preveza (1930) [Posthumously] published in «Nea Estia» (8, 88)
- When we get down the stairs... (1933) [Posthumously] published in «Beginnings» (7, July 1933)

== Translations ==
- Elegias e Sátiras/Ελεγεία και Σάτιρες, Théo de Borba Mossburger (Trans.), (n.t.) Revista Literária em Tradução, nº 1 (set/2010), Fpolis/Brasil, ISSN 2177-5141

== Sources ==
- Vangelis Hadjivassiliou (2001). Greece: books and writers. National Book Centre of Greece, Ministry of Culture.
- Τέλλος Ἄγρας, Δοκίμιο γιὰ τὸν Καρυωτάκη (in Greek).
- Η Συνάντηση Κώστας Καρυωτάκης - Μαρία Πολυδούρη (in Greek).
- Agras. T. Petros Charis; Kleon Paraschos (1928). Κώστας Καρυωτάκης [Kostas Karyotakis]. Nea Estia (in Greek). Vol. 16, 17. and IX. pp. 726–835.
- Skouras, F. (15 May 1943). Ό Καρυωτάκης, μπροοτά στό φράγμα της νευρώσεως [Karyotakis, Faced by the Barrier of Neurosis]. Nea Estia (in Greek). Vol. 396. pp. 5–9.
- Hadas, Rachel (1983). "Enjoying the Funeral: Constantine Caryotakis". Grand Street. 3 (1): 153–160. doi:10.2307/25006570. JSTOR 25006570.
- John S. Koliopoulos; Thanos M. Veremis (2007). Modern Greece: A History Since 1821. John Wiley & Sons.
