= Athos Dimoulas =

Greek poet

- Born: 1921; Athens, Greece
- Died: 1985 (aged 63–64); Athens, Greece
- Occupation: Poet
- Spouse: Kiki Dimoula (1952–1985)
- Children: 2
- Writing career
- Period: 1951–1985

Athos Dimoulas (Greek: Άθως Δημουλάς; 1921–1985) was a Greek poet. He studied civil engineering at the National Technical University of Athens and abroad (in Belgium, England and France), and worked for the Hellenic State Railways from 1944 to 1972. His collection of poems Άλλοτε και αλλού was awarded the State Prize for Poetry in 1967.

== Works ==
- Ποιήματα (Poems), 1951
- Νέα Ποιήματα (New Poems), 1951
- Σονέττα (Sonnets), 1953
- Χωρίς τίτλο (Untitled), 1956
- Ορφεύς (Orpheus), 1958
- Ένδον (Inside), 1960
- Αυτή η πραγματικότητα και η άλλη (This Reality and the Other One), 1961
- Περί μνήμης (About Poetry), 1964
- Άλλοτε και αλλού (Erstwhile and Elsewhere), 1966
- Ο αγρός της τύχης (The Field of Luck), 1972
- Η μοίρα των πεπρωμένων (The Fate of Destinies), 1979
