= Vangelis Raptopoulos =

Greek novelist

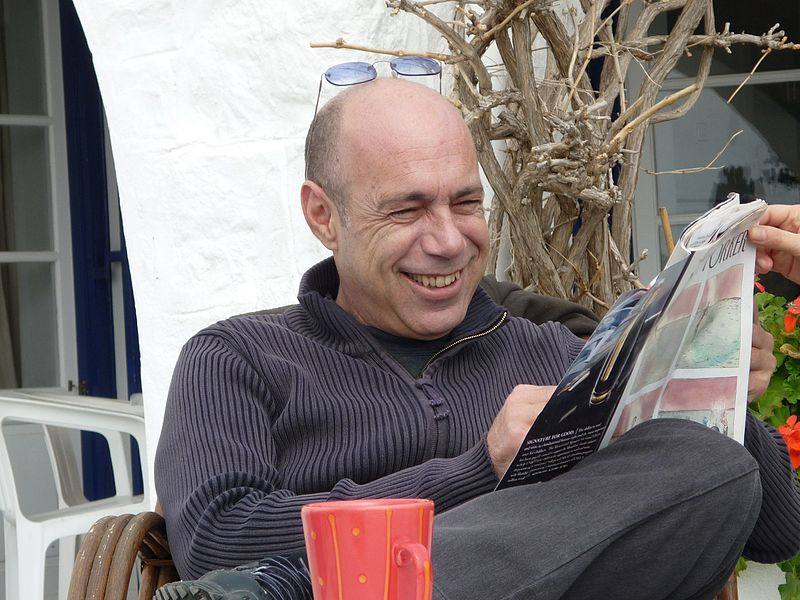
- Born: 1959 (age 66–67); Athens, Greece
- Occupation: Novelist
- Writing career
- Period: 1979–
- Genre: male
- Website: vangelisraptopoulos.wordpress.com

Vangelis Raptopoulos (Greek: Βαγγέλης Ραπτόπουλος; born 1959) is a Greek novelist and considered a part of the "1980s generation".

== Career ==
He published his first work, In Pieces, in 1979 at the age of 20. Along with his second book, Toll Post, they were adapted for television; Loula, Black Wedding and The Invention of Reality were performed on stage; while The Bachelor and Lesbian were brought to the screen. The Cicadas came out in English, The Incredible Story of Pope Joan in Italian. He has published around 30 books.

Raptopoulos has worked as a literary consultant in Greek publishing houses, a scenario consultant at Greek Film Center and various TV channels, a newspaper and magazine columnist, a screenwriter for the small and big screen, a playwright for the National Theater and independent theater groups, a producer and speaker on radio programs, an adjunct lecturer in Creative Writing at the Hellenic Open University. His personal archive has been donated to the Gennadius Library.

== Works ==
1. My Generation: In Pieces, Toll Post, The Cicadas (Η γενιά μου: Κομματάκια, Διόδια, Τα τζιτζίκια)
2. The Imperial Memory of Blood (Η αυτοκρατορική μνήμη του αίματος)
3. Nightmares with Women: The Batchelor, The Incredible Story of Pope Joan, Black Wedding (Εφιάλτες με γυναίκες: Ο εργένης, Η απίστευτη ιστορία της Πάπισσας Ιωάννας, Μαύρος γάμος)
4. Obsessions (Έμμονες ιδέες)
5. Loula (Λούλα)
6. Τales of Limni: The Game, Sad and Deep As You, Endlessly Empty House (Ιστορίες της Λίμνης: Το παιχνίδι, Βαθύς και λυπημένος όπως κι εσύ, Απέραντα άδειο σπίτι)
7. Does Simitis Listen to Mitropanos? (Ακούει ο Σημίτης Μητροπάνο;)
8. My Own America (Η δική μου Αμερική)
9. The Invention of Reality (Η επινόηση της πραγματικότητας)
10. We Lost Dad (Χάσαμε τον Μπαμπά)
11. A Bit of History of Modern Greek Literature (Λίγη Ιστορία της Νεοελληνικής Λογοτεχνίας)
12. Friends (Φίλοι)
13. Ancient Recipe: Herodotus, Heraklitus, Lucian (Αρχαία συνταγή: Ηρόδοτος, Ηράκλειτος, Λουκιανός)
14. The Great Sand (Η Μεγάλη Άμμος)
15. The High Art of Failure (Η υψηλή τέχνη της αποτυχίας)
16. The Most Secret Wound (Η πιο κρυφή πληγή)
17. F8alism (Μοιρολα3)
18. Lesbian (Λεσβία)
19. The Man Who Burned Down Greece (Ο άνθρωπος που έκαψε την Ελλάδα)
20. The Best Things that Ever Happened to Me (Ό,τι καλύτερο μου έχει συμβεί)
21. Untouched (Ανέγγιχτη)
22. Loves, Loves, Loves (Έρωτες, έρωτες, έρωτες)
23. God is to Blame, for Making the World So Beautiful: Allegories from Kazantzakis (Ο Θεός φταίει, που έκανε τον κόσμο τόσο ωραίο: Αλληγορίες από τον Καζαντζάκη)
24. Innocence (Αθωότητα)

== See also ==
- Modern Greek literature
- List of Greek writers
