= Maria Papayanni =

Greek author (born 1964)

- Born: 27 May 1964 (age 61) Larissa, Greece
- Occupation: Writer, author

Website
- mariapapayanni.gr

Maria Papayanni (born 27 May 1964) is a Greek author. She writes books for children and young adults.

== Biography ==
Papayanni was born in Larissa, Greece. She studied Greek language and literature at the Aristotle University of Thessaloniki and for many years she worked as a journalist on TV, radio, newspapers, and magazines. She later started writing books for children and teenagers and translating books into the Greek language. She has also written theatrical plays for children and librettos.

Papayanni has won numerous awards for her literary work, including the Children's Book Award of the Greek section of the International Board on Books for Young People (IBBY) and the Greek National Prize for Youth Literature.

In 1993, she married composer Thanos Mikroutsikos; together, they have two children.

== Awards ==
- (2017) Greek IBBY awards for Children's Literature (Shoes with Wings)
- (2011) State Prize for Children's Literature (The Lonesome Tree)
- (2011) Diavazo Literary Magazine Award (The Lonesome Tree)
- (2007) Diavazo Literary Magazine Award (As If By Magic)
- (2007) Greek IBBY awards for Children's Literature (As If By Magic)
- (2004) Greek IBBY awards for Children's Literature (Catch Them!)
- Nominee for the 2020 Hans Christian Andersen Award.

== Works ==
=== Novels ===
- (2003) Will You Do Me a Favour, Santa? Original title: Άγιε Βασίλη,θα μου κάνεις μια χάρη;
- (2003) An Adventure for Romeo Original title: Μια περιπέτεια για το Ρωμαίο
- (2003) Catch them! (co-written with Philippos Mandilaras) Original title: Πιάστε τους!
- (2006) As If By Magic Original title: Ως διά μαγείας
- (2008) My Name is Maya Illustrated by Yorgos Sgouros Original title: Με λένε Μάγια
- (2009) Around the World on a Bicycle Original title: Ο γύρος του κόσμου με το ποδήλατο
- (2010) The Lonesome Tree Original title: Το ∆έντρο το Μονάχο
- (2016) Shoes with Wings Original title: Παπούτσια με φτερά

=== Picture books ===
- (2001) Goodnight, Mom Original title: Καληνύχτα, μαμά!
- (2006) The Dream Thief Original title: Η κλέφτρα των ονείρων
- (2007) Isn't It Strange? Original title: Παράξενο δεν είναι; Το χρυσοφλιδάκι της γης
- (2008) Christmas: Time for Miracles Original title: Χριστούγεννα, καιρός για θαύματα
- (2012) Christmas Topsy-Turvy Original title: Εκείνα τα Χριστούγεννα ήρθαν τα κάτω πάνω!
- (2013) I Want To Win! / On ne gagne pas tous les jours / Wer gewinnt? Minedition
- (2013) Miltos, Mina, Rosalia, Che, and the... suitcase Maria Papayanni's story “Che and his Father” is included in this collection of stories that the authors donated to A.P.H.C.A. Original title: Ο Μίλτος, η Μίνα, η Ροζαλία, ο Τσε και... η βαλίτσα Association for the Psychosocial Health of Children And Adolescents (A.P.H.C.A.)
- (2015) The King Who Had Too Much of Everything Original title: Είχε απ’ όλα και είχε πολλά • Included in the White Ravens catalogue, compiled by the Internationale Jugendbibliothek, (International Youth Library), in Munich.
- (2017) The Moonling Original title: Τουλάχιστον δύο
- (2018) The Adventures of Nils Selma Lagerlöf's “The Wonderful Adventures of Nils” retold for very young children. Original title: Πες το μ’ ένα παραμύθι - Οι περιπέτειες του Νιλς

=== Early Readers ===
- (2004) Who's in Charge? Original title: Ποιος είναι ο αρχηγός;
- (2005) How Long is ‘Always’? Original title: Πάντα;
- (2005) Top of The Class Original title: Πρώτος!
- (2006) The Accidental Bookworm! Original title: Βιβλιοφάγος κατά... λάθος!
- (2007) Go to the Blackboard! Original title: Στον πίνακα!
- (2008) Back to School Original title: Επιστροφή στο σχολείο
- (2014) Petros’ Stories (an anniversary edition that includes the stories: Who's in Charge?, The Accidental Bookworm!, Go to the Blackboard!, How Long is ‘Always’?, Top of The Class, Back to School) Original title: Οι μικρές ιστορίες του Πέτρου
- (2005) Tomorrow the Earth Will Grow Original title: Τρεις παλάμες όλη η Γη
- (2012) Ellie on the Moon Original title: Η Έλλη στο φεγγάρι
- (2015) Ellie's Secret Recipe Original title: Η μυστική συνταγή της Έλλης

=== CDs and Books with CDs ===
- (2007) Isn't it Strange? Music by Thanos Mikroutsikos Story & lyrics by Maria Papayanni, Melina Karakosta Original title: Παράξενο δεν είναι;
- (2017) Says One, Says the Other Music by Thanos Mikroutsikos Story & lyrics by Maria Papayanni Original title: Λέγε ο ένας, λέγε ο άλλος...
