= Aris Marangopoulos =

Greek author, literary critic and translator

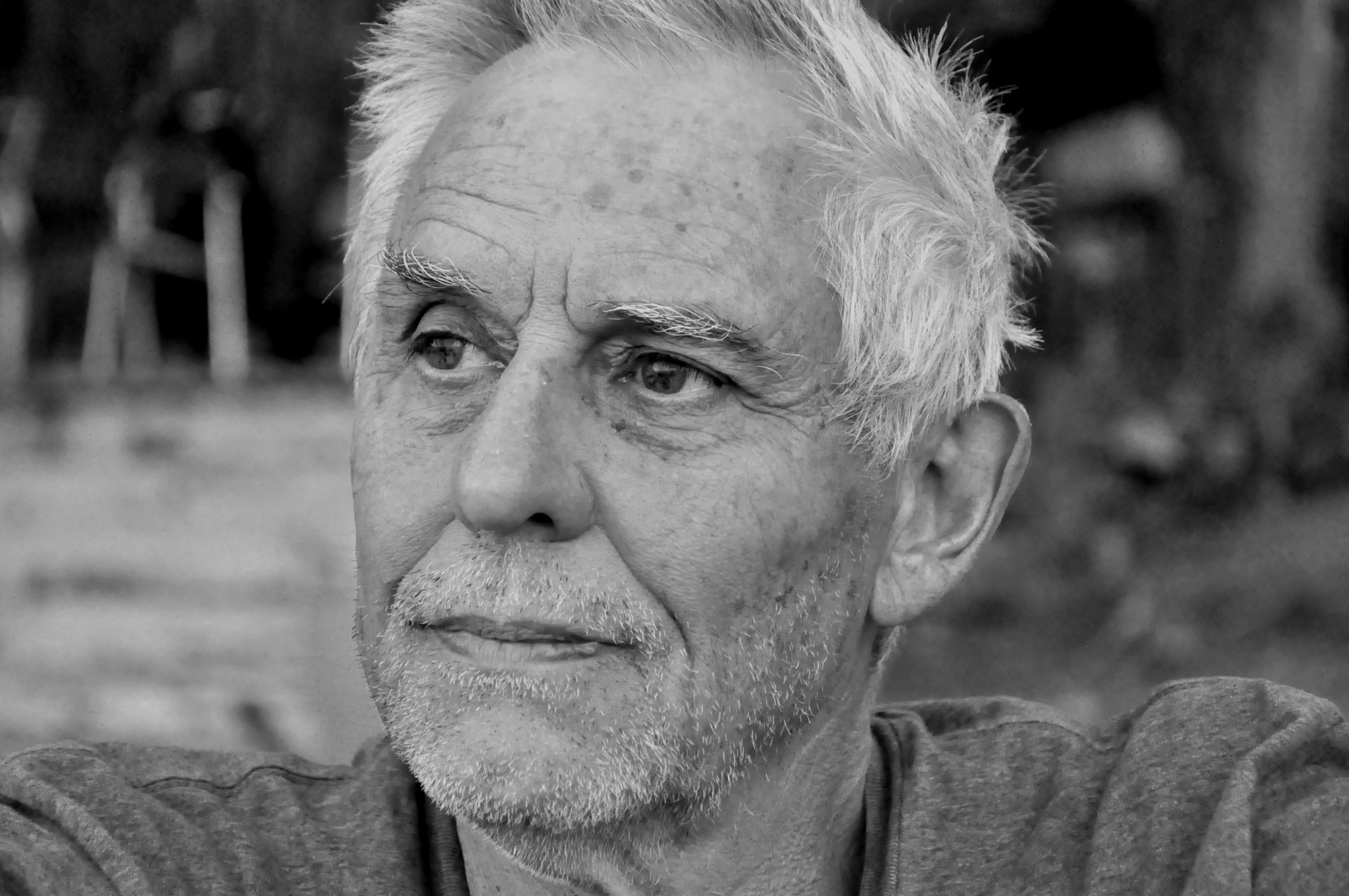
- Aris Marangopoulos, 2015.
- Born: Aristides; Athens, Greece
- Education: University of Athens, Université de Paris I Panthéon-Sorbonne
- Occupations: Prose writer, Literary critic, Editor, Translator, Publisher
- Spouse: Hera Pananidou
- Children: 2
- Writing career
- Language: Greek, English, French
- Period: 1966–1973
- Subjects: History, History of Art and Archeology
- Notable works: Paul & Laura, tableau d'après nature, The Slap-tree, Obsession with Spring, Ulysses: a reader's guide
- Notable awards: Shortlisted twice (2003, 2018) for the National Literary Award, Nikos Themelis literary award of Anagnostis magazine (2021)
- Literary movement: Modernism
- Website: arisgrandmangr.com

Aris Marangopoulos (Greek: Άρης Μαραγκόπουλος, translit. Maragkopoulos; b. Athens, 1948) is a Greek author, literary critic and translator. He studied History and Archaeology at the University of Athens, History of Art and Archaeology at the University of Paris 1 Pantheon-Sorbonne.

Marangopoulos is a politically committed intellectual (but with no political adherence to any particular party) who has been writing since the early eighties. Some of his older fiction cult books deal with the Utopian idea of communal love as a means of civil disobedience but those more recent and more widely read deal with a contemporary social context, pictured through known historic facts of political disobedience against state impingement of civil rights. In seeming contrast to that realist predilection his literary style, though, should not be defined as purely realistic. A writer who, in some of his older books, has adopted the modernist form of a poème en prose A.M. rather stands for an elective modernist style. Vassilis Vassilikos, author of the novel Z, has written for Marangopoulos' politically engaged novel Obsession with Spring:

«It is the outcome of a difficult journey through the clashing rocks of James Joyce and Jorge Luis Borges, a fruitful journey that made him rediscover Honoré de Balzac’s gold... A fantastic political thriller, an anatomy of the country we call Hellas, a novel that opens a wide discussion amid the reading community since it re-reads our recent history»

His more widely read novel so far (and one of his best as most critics agree), The Slap-tree, is a story that reviews post-war Greece through the eyes of a foreign woman, a Welsh teacher who during WW II fell in love with a young Greek communist and thereafter put every possible effort to free him from an incarceration of 17 years (a true story which made to the first page of international media in the sixties). Apart from its literary merits the story has ignited a certain discussion and dispute in Greece as to the possible ways of narrating historic facts in literature.
His «French» novel Paul et Laura, tableau d’après nature (Topos books 2017) is inspired by the lives of the intellectual activist Paul Lafargue (1842-1911, best known for his polemic essay The Right To Be Lazy) and his wife Laura Marx (1845-1911). The mythical life of these two characters who at their old age (Paul 69, Laura 66) decided to die together by a suicide pact is painted in this novel as a concave mirror reflecting the tumultuous development of the European society in the second half of 19th and the beginnings of the 20th century.

The novel is considered by all critics to be the opus magnum of the author: See e.g. A. Sainis's review (in Efimerida Syntakton 19.02.17), Efi Giannopoulou's (in Epochi, 24.01.17), Maria Moira's (in Aygi of Sunday, 19.03.17) (See more reviews in Greek and English here). This last critic has noted on account of this book:

«This daring narrative by Aris Maragkopoulos dips decisively into a staggering factual material comprising important historical characters and shocking social contents, multi specific primary sources, indexed information and multiple cross linked time records. The author, for the sake of the plot fills with sensitivity, respect and creative verve the space between the prominent historical moments that marked the course of our world, giving the historical figures of the central ideological scene a human face and in their daily lives a parallel dimension of plausibility. He removes the strangeness created by the distance in time and the inevitable mythology, and creates a dense grid of inventive interventions and interstitial links.»

Marangopoulos is considered an authority on James Joyce in Greece. He has published indeed three books and many articles on the matter. His most important study, Ulysses, A reader's guide is principally an attempt to explain James Joyce's Ulysses through affinities to its Homeric counterpart, the Odyssey, – affinities clearly exposed for the reader, in richly documented text. Exegetic suggestions in response to central issues of the Joycean critical literature are also seriously treated in the volume – documented as they are in a thorough textual and intertextual analysis of the original.
His Joycean studies have influenced his critical reading of Greek modern and contemporary prose: his writings over the years ask for a total re-mapping of the reception of literature in Greece.

He has served for two consecutive terms as Secretary Executive of the Hellenic Authors' Society.
His novel Love, Gardens, Ingratitude has been translated into Serbian and has been shortlisted for the National Literary Award of 2002, his Obsession with Spring into Turkish, his short novel Nostalgic Clone into English and various texts and articles into English, French, Turkish and Serbian. His novel Paul et Laura, tableau d'après nature has been shortlisted for the National Literary Award of 2018. He has received the special prize for literature of the literary magazine Anagnostis ("Nikos Themelis award") for his novel Fllsst, fllsst, flllssst (June 2021).

== Works ==
=== Novels ===
- Απάρνηση (Renunciation), Topos books, 2025
- Ω! Τι υπέροχη εκδρομή! (What a wonderful outing!), Topos books, 2023
- Φλλσστ, φλλσστ, φλλλσσστ (Fllsst, fllsst, flllssst), Topos books, 2020
- Πολ και Λόρα, ζωγραφική εκ του φυσικού (Paul et Laura, tableau d'après nature), Topos books, 2016
- Το Χαστουκόδεντρο (The Slap-tree), Topos books, 2012
- H μανία με την Άνοιξη (Obsession with Spring), Ellinika Grammata, 2006, Topos books 2009, Topos books 2025
- Αγάπη, Κήποι, Αχαριστία (Love, Gardens, Ingratitude), Kedros publishers 2002
- Οι ωραίες ημέρες του Βενιαμίν Σανιδόπουλου (Fine days of Benjamin Sanidopoulos), Kedros publishers 1998
- Oldsmobile, Eleutheros Typos, A: 1982 B (The 80's trilogy collective ed.): 2018

=== Novellae ===
- True Love, Topos books, 2008
- Τα δεδομένα της ζωής μας (The Facts of our Lives), A' Ellinika Grammata, 2002, B' Topos books, 2015

=== Short stories ===
- Γλυκειά Επιστροφή (Sweet Come back), Ellinika Grammata, 2003
- Δεν είναι όλα σινεμά μωρό μου (This is no cinema, baby), Eleftheros Typos, A: 1985 B (The 80's trilogy collective ed.): 2018
- Ψυχομπουρδέλο (Psycho-brothel), Eleftheros Typos, A: 1983 B (The 80's trilogy collective ed.): 2018

=== Selected essays ===
- Πορτρέτο του συγγραφέα ως κριτικού, Ανθολογία κριτικών κειμένων & Εργογραφία, επιμ.: Άννα Κατσιγιάννη - Κατερίνα Κωστίου (Portrait of the Writer as a literary Critic, an anthology of critical texts & Ergography), Topos books 2022
- Ο κ. Ιάκωβος Ζώης και ο κ. Τζάκομο Τζόις (An introduction to Giacomo Joyce as an introduction to James Joyce's œuvre), Topos books 2018
- Πεδία Μάχης Αφύλακτα (Unguarded Battlefields, a thesis on contemporary Greek culture), Topos books 2014
- Ulysses, Οδηγός Ανάγνωσης (Ulysses, a Reader's Guide), Delfini 1996, Kedros publishers 2001, Topos books 2010 / 2022
- Διαφθορείς, Εραστές, Παραβάτες (Seducers, Lovers, Transgressors), Ellinika Grammata, 2005

=== Illustrated books ===
- Αυτόπτης φωτομάρτυρας στην οδό των ονείρων (Greek pop music of the 60's, photos from Takis Pananides archive), Topos books 2013
- Η άλλη Ελλάδα: 1950-1965 (An Unknown Greece: 1950-1965, a short history of modern Greece, photos from K. Megalokonomou archive), Topos books A: 2007, B: 2018
- Ρωσία: 100 χρόνια (A short history of Russia based on photos from various archives), Stavros Niarchos institution, Rizareion institution, 2002
- Αγαπημένο Βρωμοδουβλίνο: Τόποι και Γλώσσες στον Οδυσσέα του Τζέιμς Τζόις(Dear Dirty Dublin: The Scene and the Language in Joyce's Ulysses), Kedros publishers, 1997, (revised edition with extended iconography and comments) Topos books, 2022.

=== Selected translations ===
Note: dates given are of the first publication of the Greek translation

- Swift, Jonathan, Τα ταξίδια του Γκάλιβερ (Gulliver's Travels), 1996
- Defoe, Daniel, Ροβινσώνας Κρούσος (Robinson Crusoe), 1997
- Joyce, James, Τζάκομο Τζόις (Giacomo Joyce), A: 1994, B: 2018
- James, Henry, Πλατεία Ουάσιγκτον (Washington Square), 1997
- Balzac, Honoré de, Σαραζίνος (Sarrasine), 1999
- Duras, Marguerite, Moderato Cantabile (Moderato Cantabile), A: 1991, B: 2017
