= Tassos Denegris =

Greek poet (1934–2009)

Tassos Denegris (Greek: Τάσος Δενέγρης; 1934–2009), born in Athens in 1934, was one of Greece's best known poets.

He published six collections of poetry and translated into Greek work by, among others Borges and Octavio Paz. His own work has been translated into many languages, including French, Hungarian, Portuguese and Spanish.

In 1975 Tassos Denegris was a fellow at the international writing program at the University of Iowa and 1993 he was an invited guest at the Cambridge poetry festival. He has also given readings of his work in Belgrade, New Delhi, Strasburg, Tübingen, Colombia, and in 1998 was one of a gathering of "Poets of the World" who met in Lima. He died on 7 February 2009.
