= Sam Albatros =

Writer, queer artist and poetry translator

Sam Albatros is a pseudonymous Greek-born author, queer artist and poetry translator. They wear masks and have never shown their face publicly.

== Early life and education ==
Albatros was born and raised in rural Greece. They hold an MPhil in Psychology from University of Cambridge and a PhD in Cognitive Neuroscience from University College London. Albatros describes themselves using "they/them" pronouns.

== Career ==
Their debut novel Faulty Boy and its stage adaptations, which focus on a gender nonconforming/queer child, have attracted mainstream Greek media attention. As an artist, they have presented video-art performances in Greece, Cyprus, UK, and Berlin.

In May 2021, they took part in the Exchange Program Thessaloniki – Leipzig 2021, a two-month residency programme in Leipzig.

They publish original and translated poems on YouTube and on their website https://queerpoets.com.

== Bibliography ==
=== Fiction ===
- Faulty Boy (novel, Hestia Publishers & Booksellers, 2021)
- Dad, I want you to be ashamed of me (novel, self-published, 2024)

== Awards ==
- Stavros Niarchos Foundation Artist Fellowship by ARTWORKS, 2021
