= Katerina Poulios =

British-born figure skater (born 2001)

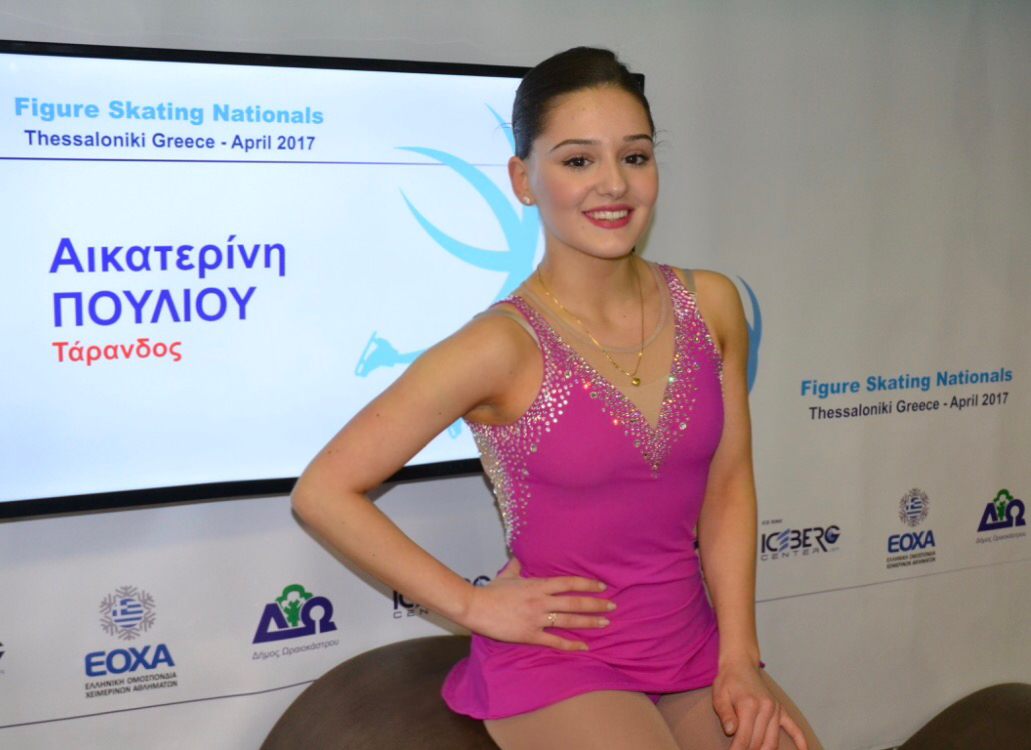
Poulios after the Junior Short Program at 2017 Greek National Championships

Katerina Lily Poulios (born 3 January 2001 in Paddington, London) is a British former figure skater who competed for Greece. By July 2013, she was two-time champion of the Greek National Figure Skating Championships and placed second at Novice and Junior level in 2016 and 2017, respectively. She then gained a place on the National Hellenic Team, enabling her to compete in ISU Events. She represented Greece at the 2014 ISU World Development Trophy in Gdańsk, Poland. She also appeared on the ITV daytime programme This Morning alongside British figure skater Anna Litvinenko.

== Early life and education ==
Poulios was born on 3 January 2001 in St Mary's Hospital, London, England. She attended Christ's Hospital School, in Horsham, West Sussex. She took part in a wide range of extra-curricular activities, including music and theatre.

== Career ==
Poulios began skating at the age of ten, at Guildford. She won the Greek National Figure Skating Championships in 2013 and 2014, and came second in 2016 and 2017. She has been representing Greece internationally since the 2014–15 season, making her International début at the 2014 Skate Southern International, in Lee Valley, London, placing fourth. She was then selected to represent Greece at the 2014 ISU World Development Trophy in Gdańsk, Poland, where she placed eighth.

She was coached by Melissa Galvin and 2015 British Pairs Champion, Hamish Gaman.
