= Nikiforos Vrettakos =

Greek poet

Nikiforos Vrettakos (Greek: Νικηφόρος Βρεττάκος; 1 January 1912 – 4 August 1991) was a Greek writer and poet.

== Biography ==
Nikephoros Vrettakos was born in the village of Krokees, near Sparta, Laconia, but originated from Mani. He published his first collection of poems, Under Shadows and Lights, in 1929, at the age of seventeen. That same year he moved to Athens to attend university, but left after a year to take a series of jobs as a clerk in various businesses. In 1937 he began a thirty-year career in the Greek Civil Service, also seeing combat service in the Greco-Italian War during this period. In 1967 he responded to the takeover of Greece by a military dictatorship by going into self-imposed exile in Switzerland and Italy, where he remained until returning to Greece in 1974.. In April 1970 he arrived in Palermo, where he remained for most of the following years until 1974. His Sicilian period represented an important chapter in both his personal life and his literary activity.

Vrettakos came to Palermo following an invitation from the Greek scholar Bruno Lavagnini, then president of the Sicilian Institute of Byzantine and Neo-Hellenic Studies. Lavagnini involved him in the preparation of the Modern Greek–Italian Dictionary, an important lexicographical project to which Vrettakos contributed extensively. He worked closely with the Institute and with a circle of Italian scholars of Greek language and literature, while continuing his own poetic and literary activity.

Vrettakos was also associated with other members of the Sicilian Greek-studies community, including Vincenzo Pecoraro, Salvatore Nicosia and Renata Lavagnini. Their testimonies were subsequently used to recall aspects of the poet’s life in Palermo.

The Palermo years were not merely a period of exile for Vrettakos but also a significant phase of literary renewal. Removed from the political circumstances of Greece, he continued to write poetry and prose and became increasingly engaged with Sicily and its landscape. His experience of the island found direct expression in works such as Journey to Sicily (Viaggio in Sicilia), in which the Mediterranean landscape becomes a poetic space through which the exiled poet contemplates his distant homeland. During his stay he also worked on Prometheus, or the Game of a Day (Prometheus or the Game of a Day), a dramatic work connected with the themes of tyranny, freedom and political oppression.

In 1974, after suffering from severe tuberculosis, Vrettakos was hospitalized in Palermo for several months. With the intervention of Roger Milliex and the assistance of the Sicilian authorities, he subsequently moved to Serres in the French Alps for convalescence. He returned to Greece on 16 August 1974, following the restoration of democracy and the fall of the junta.

He also wrote a poem about Kostas Georgakis, the student who set himself ablaze in Genoa as a protest against the junta.

Nikephoros Vrettakos was considered one of Greece's most important poets. He won a number of prizes and medals, including the Greek State Poetry Prize twice. Some of his poems became popular songs in musical settings by Greek composers, including Mikis Theodorakis. His verse was also translated into many languages. He was also elected as a member of the Academy of Athens in 1987.

Vrettakos died in Athens.

== Works ==
Greek text

- Τά ποιήματα (ed. Tria Phylla, Athens, 1991), 3 vols

Works by or about, in English

- The Charioteer: An Annual Review of Modern Greek Culture. Numbers 33/34 1991-1992 (Pella Publishing Company, Inc.) — Book length special issue of articles about and English translations of Vrettakos's poems
- "Nikiforos Vrettakos - Selected Poems", translated by David Connolly, Aiora Press, Athens 2015

Anthologies in English including some of Vrettakos's poems

- Bien, P. et al. A Century of Greek Poetry: Bilingual Edition. (Cosmos Publishing, Vale, N.J. 2004)
- Friar, Kimon. Modern Greek Poetry (Efstathiadis, Athens, 1993)
- Raizis, M. Byron. Greek Poetry Translations (Efstathiadis, Athens, 1983)
