= Justine Frangouli-Argyris =

Greek author & journalist (born 1959)

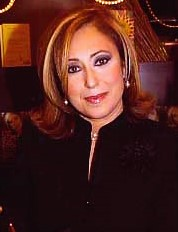
Justine Frangouli-Argyris, 2007

Justine Frangouli-Argyris (Greek: Ιουστίνη Φραγκούλη-Αργύρη; born on July 31, 1959) is a Greek author and journalist. She was born on the Greek island of Lefkada, where she completed her primary and secondary education. A graduate of the University of Athens Law School's Political Science department, Frangouli-Argyris has been a contributor to daily newspapers, radio, television and magazines in Greece since 1983.

She is a member of the Journalists' Union of the Athens Daily Newspapers (ESIEA) and has periodically worked for major radio stations such as ERA, SKY, FLASH 9.61, Athens Municipality Radio 9.84 as well as for Greek state television (ET).

== Biography ==
Justine Frangouli-Argyris has been living and working in Montreal, Canada since 1989 as a correspondent for the Athens News Agency (ANA), Eleftherotypia and Ethnos newspapers. During the same period, she also collaborated with local Greek-Canadian and American radio stations and publications.

Frangouli-Argyris is a member of the Union of Journalists of Athens Daily Newspapers (ESIEA) and has been working in Montreal, Canada since 1989 as a correspondent for the Athens News Agency (ANA), She is a member of UNEQ (Union des Ecrivaines et Ecrivains Quebequois) and QWF (Quebec Writers’ Federation).

She is currently the Athens News Agency correspondent for Canada.

She is a Huffington Post blogger writing weekly articles about Canada and Greece.

As an author, she has written The Lonely Path of Integrity (Exandas Publishers, Athens, 2002), the authorized biography of Spyridon, former Primate of the Greek Orthodox Church of America (1996–1999).

Her second book Petaei, Petaei to Synnefo (Clouds Fly, Don't They?), a novel dedicated to a human story which plays out in 20th-century Greece on the island of Lefkada, was published by Psychogios Publishers (Athens) in 2003.

Her third book, Shopping Around the World: Unbeatable Bargains and Bite-Sized Stories, a shopping guide spiced with short stories, was published by Ellinika Grammata (Athens) in 2004.

The Legacy (Η Παρακαταθήκη), published by Ellinika Grammata in 2005, is a bilingual edition that includes selected speeches and writings by Spyridon, the former Greek Orthodox Archbishop of America, with editing, introduction and commentary by Justine Frangouli-Argyris.

"Psila Takounia Gia Panda" (High Heels For Six ), a best-selling novel about women in the post-feminist era,(December 2006).

Her work, Imerologio Avanas (Havana Diaries), is a journal about Havana just prior to Fidel Castro’s resignation (April 2008).

“For the Love of Others” is a best-seller novel based on the true story of John Catsimatidis’ mother (Psihogios 2009)

Her best-selling novel “Love in the Fog” is a psychological thriller (Psichogios 2011)

Her children's book Pol and Lara are travelling is a book about the environmental issues (Psichogios 2011)

In 2013, her novel High Heels For Six was published by amazon kindle, and her novel Psila Takounia Gia Panda was reprinted by Armos Publications.
