= Stefanos Tassopoulos =

Greek novelist, playwright and poet

- Born: 1939; Volos, Greece
- Died: 5 February 2013 (aged 73–74); Athens, Greece
- Occupations: novelist, playwright, poet
- Writing career
- Period: 1971–

Stefanos Tassopoulos (Greek: Στέφανος Τασσόπουλος) (born 1939 in Volos) is a Greek novelist, playwright and poet. He read Law at the University of Athens; he also studied Theatre and journalism and worked as a journalist. He died in Athens on February 5, 2013.

== Works ==
- Εδώ (Here), (play, 1971)
- Μνηστρόμνηστα, (play, 1975)
- Ημερολόγιο νυκτός (Night Journal), (poems, 1979)
- Δεκαπενθήμερο (Fortnight), (novel, 1983)
- Ηλιακό Ωρολόγιο (Sundial), (novel, 1988)
