= Vassilis Steriadis =

Greek poet

- Born: 1947; Volos, Greece
- Died: 2003 (aged 55–56); Athens, Greece
- Occupations: Poet, critic
- Writing career
- Period: 1970–2002

Vassilis Steriadis (Greek: Βασίλης Στεριάδης; 1947–2003) was a Greek poet and critic.

== Life ==
He studied Law at the University of Athens and Italian at the Universita per Stranieri in Perugia, Italy. He worked as a lawyer until 2002.

From 1969 on, he collaborated with many literary periodicals (Lotos, Hroniko etc.), and from 1976 to 1984 he was writing critical articles and book reviews for the newspaper Kathimerini. He coined the literary term Genia tou 70, which refers to Greek authors who began publishing their work during the 1970s, especially towards the end of the Greek military junta of 1967-1974 and at the first years of the Metapolitefsi.

== Works ==
=== Poetry ===
- Ο κ. Ιβο (Mr Ivo), 1970
- Το ιδιωτικό αεροπλάνο (The Personal Airplane), 1971
- Ντικ ο χλομός (Pale Dick), 1976
- Το χαμένο κολλιέ (The Lost Necklace), 1983
- Ο προπονητής παίκτης (The Trainer Player), 1992
- Χριστούγεννα της Ισοπαλίας (Equalizing Christmas), 2002

=== Prose ===
Η κατηγορία Α1 (Category A1), novel, 1979
