= Christoforos Liontakis =

Greek poet and translator (1945–2019)

- Born: 1945; Heraklion, Greece
- Died: 26 July 2019 (aged 74); Athens, Greece
- Occupations: Poet, translator
- Writing career
- Period: 1973–2019

Christoforos Liontakis (Greek: Χριστόφορος Λιοντάκης; 1945 – 26 July 2019) was an award-winning Greek poet and translator. He read law at the University of Athens and philosophy of law at the Sorbonne, in Paris. His first collection of poems was published in 1973.

He belonged to the so-called Genia tou 70, a literary term referring to Greek authors who began publishing their work during the 1970s, especially towards the end of the Greek military junta of 1967-1974 and during the first years of the Metapolitefsi.

For his collection of poems With the Light, published in 1999, he received the Greek National Book Award for the Year 2000 and the poetry prize of the prestigious literary journal Diavazo. The French Ministry of Culture honored him with its Knighthood of Arts and Letters, and the municipality of Heraklion awarded him the Nikos Kazantzakis Literary Prize.

Liontakis died on 26 July 2019.

== Poetry ==
- Το τέλος του τοπίου (The end of the landscape), 1973
- Μετάθεση (Transference), 1976
- Υπόγειο γκαράζ (Underground Garage), 1978
- Ο Μινώταυρος μετακομίζει (The Minotaur Moves), 1982
- O ροδώνας με τους χωροφύλακες (Rose Garden with the Gendarmes), 1988
- Με το φως (With the Light), 1999

== Prose ==
- Νυχτερινό γυμναστήριο (Nocturnal Gymnasium), 1993

== Selected translations ==
- Stendhal, Αρμάνς (Armance), 1978
- Bonnefoy, Yves, Οι τάφοι της Ραβέννας (Les Tombeaux de Ravenne), 1981
- Genet, Jean, Ο σκοινοβάτης, 1986
- Rimbaud, Arthur, Μια εποχή στην Κόλαση (Une Saison en Enfer), 2004
