= Yannis Kondos =

Greek poet (1943–2015)

- Born: 1943; Aigio, Greece
- Died: 21 January 2015 (aged 71–72); Athens, Greece
- Occupation: Poet
- Writing career
- Period: 1970–present

Yannis Kondos (Greek: Γιάννης Κοντός; 1943 – January 2015) was a Greek poet. He read Economics at the University of Piraeus (then Higher School for Industrial Studies). He founded the bookshop Ηνίοχος in 1971, along with Thanassis Niarchos. Since 1975, he has been working for Kedros publishers. He has also been professor of poetry for Kostas Kazakos' School of Dramatic Art.

He belongs to the so-called Genia tou 70, which is a literary term referring to Greek authors who began publishing their work during the 1970s, especially towards the end of the Greek military junta of 1967–1974 and at the first years of the Metapolitefsi.

He was awarded the State Prize for Poetry for his collection, Absurd Athlete in 1998. His work has been translated into English, German and Danish.

== Poetry ==
- Περιμετρική (Circular Route), 1970
- Το χρονόμετρο (The Chronometer), 1972
- Τα απρόοπτα (The Unforeseen), 1975
- Φωτοτυπίες (Photocopies), 1977
- Danger in the Streets, tr. J. Stathatos (1978) [English translations of selected poems]
- Στη διάλεκτο της ερήμου (In the Dialect of the Desert), 1980
- Τα οστά (The Bones), 1982
- The Bones: selected poems 1972–1982, tr. J. Stone (1985)
- Ανωνύμου μοναχού (By an Anonymous Monk), 1985
- Δωρεάν σκοτάδι (Gratuitous Darkness), 1989
- Στο γύρισμα της μέρας (At the Turn of Day), 1992
- Όταν πάνω από την πόλη ακούγεται ένα τύμπανο (When a Drum is Heard over the City), selection, 1992
- Ο αθλητής του τίποτα (Absurd Athlete), 1997
- Πρόκες στα σύννεφα (Pins in the Clouds), 1999
- Η υποτείνουσα της σελήνης (The Moon's Hypotenuse), 2002
- Δευτερόλεπτα του φόβου (Seconds of Fear), 2006

== Prose ==
- Τα ευγενή μέταλλα (The Noble Metals), 1994
- Αριστείδης, ο μικρός ιπποπόταμος (Aristeides, the Little Hippopotamus), for children, 2001
- Τα Χριστούγεννα έρχονται (Christmas is coming), 2004
- Τα ευγενή μέταλλα ΙΙ (The Noble Metals II), 2005
