= Takis Sinopoulos =

Takis Sinopoulos (Greek: Τάκης Σινόπουλος; Pyrgos, Elis, March 17, 1917 – Athens, April 25, 1981) was a Greek poet and a leading figure among the so-called first postwar generation of Greek poets. A doctor by profession, he came of age at the beginning of perhaps the most terrible decade of Greece's recent history, running from the Metaxas dictatorship through war, occupation and the horrors of civil war, many of which he experienced at first hand. These experiences, and their exorcism, inform much of his work, as did the colonels' dictatorship of 1967–1974. Alongside his poetry, he was an astute and prolific critic as well as a talented painter, and his encouragement help launch the very much younger poets who became known as the generation of the seventies.

== Principal publications ==
- No Man's Land, 1952
- Songs, 1953
- The Meeting with Max, 1956
- Helen, 1958
- Night and Counterpoint, 1959
- The Song of Joanna and Constantine, 1961
- The Poetry of Poetry, 1964
- Deathfeast, 1972
- Stones, 1972
- Chronicle, 1975
- The Map, 1977
- The Book of Night, 1978

== Translations ==
- Landscape of Death The Selected Poems of Takis Sinopoulos, tr. K. Friar (1979) [Greek & English texts]
- Selected Poems, tr. J. Stathatos (1981)
