= Kiki Dimoula =

Greek poet (1931–2020)

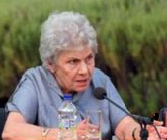
- Dimoula in 2011
- Born: Vasiliki Radou; 6 June 1931; Athens, Greece
- Died: 22 February 2020 (aged 88); Athens, Greece
- Occupation: Poet
- Spouse: Athos Dimoulas (1952–1985)
- Children: 2
- Writing career
- Period: 1952–2020

Kiki Dimoula (née Vasiliki Radou (Βασιλική Ράδου); Greek: Κική Δημουλά; 6 June 1931 – 22 February 2020) was a Greek poet. She was the first female poet ever to be included in the prestigious French publisher Gallimard’s poetry series.

== Work ==
Dimoula's work is haunted by the existential dissolution of the post-war era. Her central themes are hopelessness, insecurity, absence and oblivion. Using diverse subjects (from a "Marlboro boy" to mobile phones) and twisting grammar in unconventional ways, she accentuated the power of the words through astonishment and surprise, but always managed to retain a sense of hope.

Her poetry has been translated into English, French, German, Swedish, Danish, Spanish, Italian and many other languages. In 2014, the eleventh issue of Tinpahar published 'Kiki Dimoula in Translation', which featured three English translations of her better known works.

== Recognition ==
Dimoula was awarded the Greek State Prize twice (1971, 1988), as well as the Kostas and Eleni Ouranis Prize (1994) and the Αριστείο Γραμμάτων of the Academy of Athens (2001). She was awarded the European Prize for Literature for 2009. Since 2002, Dimoula was a member of the Academy of Athens.

== Personal life ==
Dimoula worked as a clerk for the Bank of Greece. She was married to the poet Athos Dimoulas (1952–1985), with whom she had two children.

== Works ==
- Ποιήματα (Poems), 1952
- Έρεβος (Erebus), 1956
- Ερήμην (In absentia), 1958
- Επί τα ίχνη (On the trail), 1963
- Το λίγο του κόσμου (The Little of the World),1971
- Το Τελευταίο Σώμα μου (My last body), 1981
- Χαίρε ποτέ (Farewell Never),1988
- Η εφηβεία της Λήθης (Lethe's Adolescence), 1996
- Eνός λεπτού μαζί (One Minute's Together), 1998
- Ήχος απομακρύνσεων (Departure's Sound), 2001
- Χλόη θερμοκηπίου (Glass-house lawn), 2005
- Μεταφερθήκαμε παραπλεύρως (We moved next door), 2007
- Συνάντηση (Meeting), 2007 (Anthology with seventy-three paintings by John Psychopedis)
- Έρανος Σκεψεων, 2009
- Τα εύρετρα, 2010
- Δημόσιος Καιρός, 2014
