= Nikos Karouzos =

Greek modernist poet (1926–1990)

- Νίκος Καρούζος
- Karouzos in 1987
- Born: 17 July 1926; Nafplio, Greece
- Died: 28 September 1990 (aged 64); Athens, Greece
- Occupation: Poet

Nikos Karouzos (Greek: Νίκος Καρούζος; 17 July, 1926 – 28 September, 1990) was a Greek modernist poet.

He published his first poems in 1949. He also wrote literary criticism and essays on the theatre and art. He was awarded the State Poetry Prize twice, in 1972 and 1988. His Collected Poems were published in 2004 by Shoestring Press (Nottingham, England, UK), translated by Philip Ramp. In the poetry of Karouzos, a fusion of the religious dimension of life with the ideological one was identified, and at the same time the lyrical element renewed its lyricism on the foundations of classical romanticism. His poetics significantly shaped modern Greek poetry and at the same time defined the style and ethos of contemporary Greek-speaking poetry of the Left.
