= Alexis Stamatis =

Greek writer (1960–2026)

Alexis Stamatis Αλέξης Σταμάτης
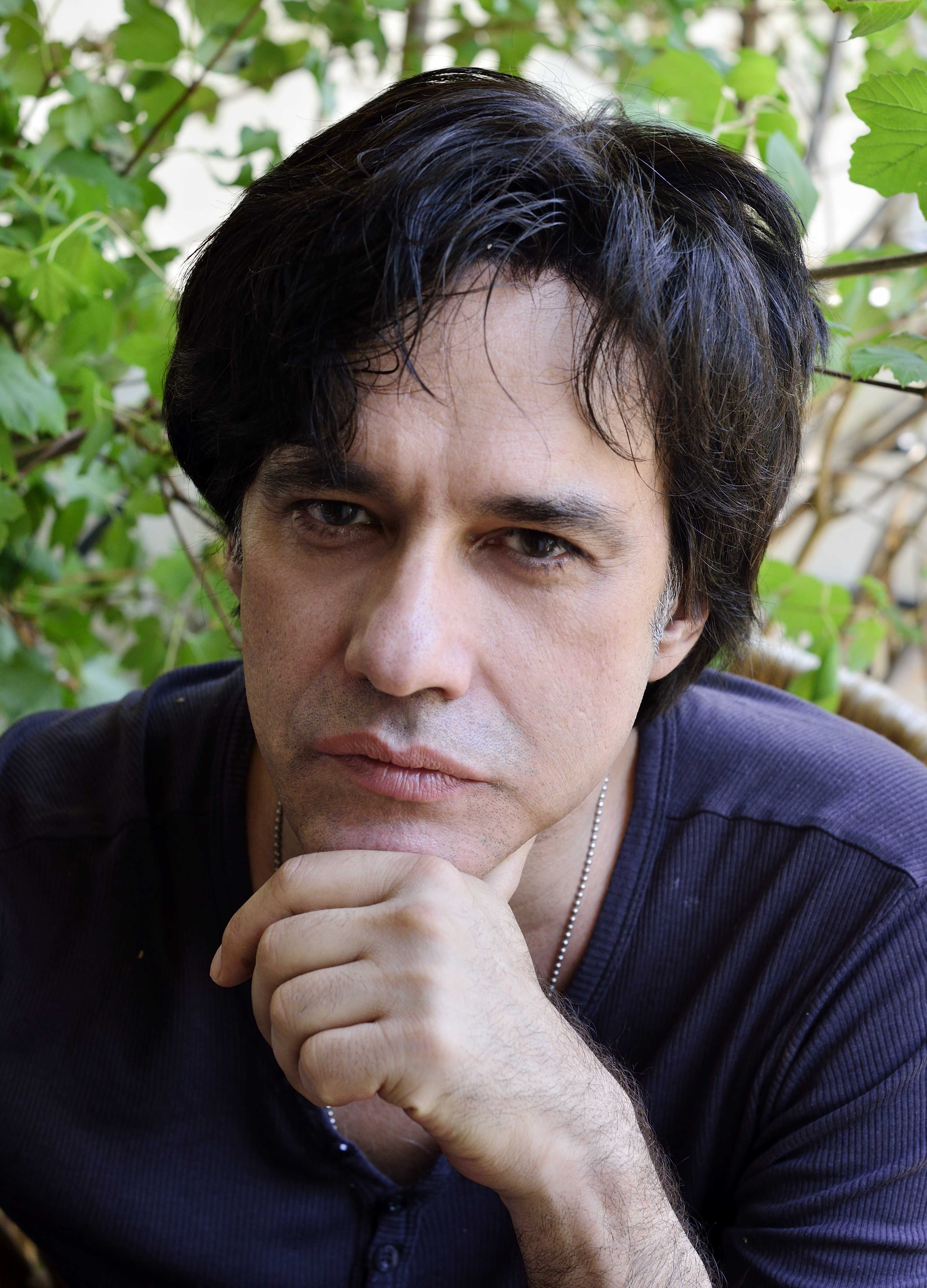
- Stamatis in 2012
- Born: 19 July 1960; Athens, Greece
- Died: 20 July 2026 (aged 66); Athens, Greece
- Education: Moraitis High School
- Alma mater: Architectural Association School of Architecture (B.A.; graduate coursework); Architectural Association School of Architecture (M.Phil.; Social Studies); Westminster University (Post graduate diploma in Fim and TV Studies)
- Occupations: Writer, screenwriter, playwright
- Spouse: Eva Simatou
- Children: 1
- Relatives: Betty Arvaniti (mother)
- Writing career
- Language: Greek
- Subject: Literature
- Notable works: Bar Flaubert; Mother Ash; The book of rain
- Notable awards: National Endowment of the Arts, International Literature Award for American Fugue First Award of The Circle of the Greek Children's Book- IBBY Greece, for his children's book Alkis and the Labyrinth

Alexis Stamatis (Greek: Αλέξης Σταμάτης; 19 July 1960 – 20 July 2026) was a Greek novelist, playwright, and poet. Amongst other work, he published nineteen novels, six books of poetry, and a number of plays. As of 2017, he had his own column at the Greek newspaper VIMA. He taught creative writing at various institutions.

== Life and career ==
Son of Kostas Stamatis, an architect, and Betty Arvaniti, a film actress, Stamatis studied architecture at the National Technical University of Athens and took postgraduate degrees in architecture and cinematography in London.

Stamatis published nineteen novels. His second novel, Βar Flaubert (Kedros, 2000), a critically acclaimed bestseller in Greece, has been published in the UK, France, Italy, Spain, Portugal, Serbia, and Bulgaria. Bar Flaubert has been adapted as a screenplay by the author and the director Vassilis Douvlis. Stamatis also published six books of poetry. His second book, The Architecture of Interior Spaces, was awarded the Nikiforos Vrettakos Prize in 1994. Τwo collections of his poems have been translated in Great Britain. He wrote the libretti for two musical pieces performed in Megaron Mousikis and the Chora theatre. In 2004, he participated in the International Writing Program of the University of Iowa through a Greek Fulbright Artists & Art-Scholars Award.

In 2007, the US publishing house Etruscan Press won the 1st International Literary Award from the US National Endowment for the Arts to publish his novel American Fugue. Stamatis presented his book in the US in 2008. His tour included around 15 universities all over the country, including Harvard, Yale, New York University, San Francisco State University, and Brown. .

He wrote the following plays, among others: Last Martha, Monologue for the Cultural Olympiad; directed and performed by Dimitris Ikonomou (2003), Dakrygona (Tear Gas), 2010, and Kill Your Darlings, 2012, a three-act play, staged at the Theatre of Kefallinias Street and directed by Aris Troupakis, Melissia, National Theater of Greece 2012 (play reading), Midnight in a perfect world, Monologue (2013) directed by Aris Troupakis and staged at Theatro Technis Karolos Koun, Innerview, one-act play, staged at Southbank Centre, London (2013). for the event "Greece is the word!", Innerview, a three-act play, which was later staged at the Michael Cacoyiannis Foundation, 2014–15.

In 2009 he was a writer in residence in Shanghai, invited by the Shanghai Writers Association. He represented Greece in various Book Festivals and seminars all over the world. He was working for many major Greek newspapers and magazines. Ηe taught creative writing at the Hellenic American Academic Foundation (Athens College – Psychico College) and in various other institutions.

On 19 October 2013, he took part in the event "Greece is the Word" at the Southbank Centre London.

Stamatis was interviewed by Victoria Hislop and a short play of his, "Innerview", was staged with the actors Eva Simatou and Nikos Poursanidis. He was married to the actress Eva Simatou, and they had a son, Ermis who was born in 2019.

Stamatis died on 20 July 2026, at the age of 66 after a struggle with a rare blood disorder.

== Novels ==
- 1998 – The Seventh Elephant. Kedros, 2nd edition, Kastaniotis, 2016
- 2000 – Bar Flaubert. Kedros, 16th edition, 2011, 32th edition, Kastaniotis, 2023
- 2002 – Like a Thief in the night. Kastaniotis, 4th edition, 2009
- 2003 – Theseus Street. Kastaniotis, 4th edition, 2004
- 2005 – Mother Ash . Kastaniotis, 5th edition, 2005
- 2006 – American Fugue. Kastaniotis, 4th edition, 2007
- 2008 – Villa Combray, Kastaniotis, 9th edition, 2014
- 2009 – Kill your darlings, Kastaniotis 4th edition, 2010
- 2011 – Sunday, Kastaniotis 2nd edition, 2011
- 2012 – Can you cry underwater?, Kastaniotis, 3rd edition, 2013
- 2013 – Chameleons. Kastaniotis, 2013, 2nd edition, 2014
- 2014 – Melissia. Kastaniotis, 2014, 2nd edition, 2015
- 2015 – The book of rain, Kastaniotis, 2015
- 2017 – Motel Morena, Kastaniotis, 2017
- 2018 – The man of the fifth act, Kastaniotis, 2018
- 2020 – Innocent Creatures, Kastaniotis, 2020
- 2021 – The White Room, Kastaniotis, 2021
- 2023 – I’ve been so many others, Kastaniotis, 2023
- 2025 – The boy and Angelos, Metaixmio, 2025

== Novellas and short stories ==
- 2002 – Scorpio in the drawer (novella). Ellinika Grammata, editions
- 2005 – Zoi (novella). Minoas Editions
- 2007 – Stories for Lonely People (short stories), Topos editions
- 2010 – The errand boy – Kurtz Revisited (short story), Magic Box editions ("The Book of Evil")
- 2010 – Legendary Tales (short stories), Kastaniotis editions
- 2014 – Zoi (novella), Minoas Editions [re-issue, 2nd edition 2014]
- 2025 – For the Great Gabo (short stories), Minoas Editions + translation into Colombian

== Novel translations ==
- 2000 – The Seventh Elephant. Arcadia Books, London, UK
- 2002 – Bar Flaubert. Crocceti Editions, Milano, Italy
- 2003 – Bar Flaubert. Alter Edit, Paris, France
- 2006 – Bar Flaubert. Rd Editores, Seville, Spain
- 2007 – Bar Flaubert. Livre de Poche, Hachette, Paris, France
- 2007 – Bar Flaubert. Arcadia Books, London, UK
- 2008 – American Fugue. Etruscan Press, USA
- 2008 – Fuga Americana. Crocceti Editions, Milano, Italy
- 2009 – Bar Flaubert. Archipelag editions, Belgrade, Serbia
- 2010 – Mother Ash. Nemesis Editions, Istanbul, Turkey
- 2011 – Bar Flaubert. Porto Editora, Lisboa, Portugal
- 2013 – Mother Ash, Kastaniotis edition [in English]
- 2015 – Bar Flaubert, Panorama, Sophia, Bulgaria

== Poetry collections ==
- 1992 – The Corner of the World. Socolis Editions
- 1993 – Architecture of the Intimate Spaces. Kastaniotis Editions
- 1995 – A Simple Method of Three. Kastaniotis Editions
- 1999 – Dense Now. Ellinika Grammata editions
- 2002 – The closer I get the more the future gets away. Rodakio
- 2004 – We are never alone. Kastaniotis Editions.

== Poetry translations ==
- 2001 – Collected Poetry of Alexis Stamatis. Dionysia Press, Edinburgh
- 2003 – Dense Now. Dionysia Press, Edinburgh
- 2014 – We are never alone. Dionysia Press, Edinburgh (under publication).

== Children's books ==
- 2008 – Alkis and the Labyrinth. Kastaniotis Editions (IBBY award)
- 2022 – Talentina. Kastaniotis Editions

== Theatrical plays ==
- 2008 – Last Martha, Ianos Editions.
- 2009 – Genesis. Two Monologues (The Errant Boy & Genesis), Socolis – Kouledakis Editions
- 2010 – Dakrygona (Tear Gas)
- 2012 – Kill your darlings, Socolis – Kouledakis editions
- 2013 – Midnight in a perfect world – Theatro Technos Karolos Koun editions
- 2014 – Melissia Editions théâtrales de la maison Antoine Vitez
- 2014 – Innerview Philotypon editions
- 2018– The White room Theatro Stathmos

== Theatre, opera and film ==
=== Theatre ===
- 2002–2003 – Look at me. Opera Theatre Group, Chororoes Theatre; directed by Theo Abazis
- 2002 – Last Martha. Monologue for the Cultural Olympiad; directed and performed by Dimitris Ikonomou
- 2008 – Last Martha. Monologue; Theatre of Kefallinias Street, directed by Vicky Georgiadou and performed by Christos Stergioglou
- 2009 – Genesis. Two Monologues (The Errant Boy & Genesis), Chora Theatre, directed by Avra Sidiropoulou and performed by Christos Stergioglou and Rinio Kyriazis respectively
- 2010 – Dream a little dream of me, one-act play, directed by Ektoras Lygizos, performed by Dimitris Makalias, Michalis Oikonomou, Danai Papoutsi for the "24 Hour Plays Athens" (Chora Theater)
- 2010 – Dakrygona (Tear Gas), play, Theatre of Kefallinias Street directed by Aris Troupakis.
- 2011 – Thalamos, one-act play, Theatre "Synetgeion" directed by Giolanda Markopoulou, and performed by Maria Aiginitou, Despoina Kourti, Charis Charalambous (part of the play "Exodus")
- 2012 – Kill Your Darlings, play, Theatre of Kefallinias Street directed by Aris Troupakis
- 2012 – Melissia, National Theater of Greece directed by Eleni Boza (reading)
- 2013 – Midnight in a perfect world. Monologue, directed by Aris Troupakis and performed by Nikos Arvanitis at Theatro Technis Karolos Koun (Athens Art Theatre)
- 2013 – Innerview One-act play. Staged at the Southbank Centre, London, for the event "Greece is the word!" Performed by Nikos Poursanidis and Eva Simatou, directed by the writer and the actors
- 2014 – Innerview Three-act play. Staged at the Michael Cacoyiannis Foundation, directed by Lilly Meleme performed by Nikos Arvanitis, Eva Simatou, produced by Lycophos productions and Giorgos Lykiardopoulos
- 2018 – Kosmos Gonia Staged at the Second Stage of Kefallinias Street Theatre, directed by Aris Troupakis performed by Nikos Arvanitis, Nikos Alexiou
- 2019 – Melissia Five-act play. Staged at the National Theatre of Greece, directed by George Paloumbis, performed by Betty Arvaniti, Nikos Arvanitis, Nikos Hatzopoulos, Mari Kechagiogou, Nefeli Kouri, Kostas Vasardanis
- 2019 – Blue Room Play reading at the Theatro Technis, directed by Manos Karatzogiannis, performed by Anna Fonsou, Lena Papaligoura, Eva Simatou, Nickos Vatikiotis
- 2021 – White Room Staged at the Stathmos Theatre, directed by Manos Karatzogiannis, performed by Smaragda Smyrnaiou, Peggy Stathacopoulou, Eva Simatou, Dimitris Tsiklis

=== Opera ===
- 2000 – Socrates. Megaro Mousikis, music by Theo Abazis, directed by Victor Ardittes
- 2000 – A walk in Hades. Orchestra of Colours, Chora Theatre, music by Theo Abazis.

=== Film ===
- 2002 – Bar Flaubert. With the film director Vassilis Douvlis Stamatis co-wrote a screenplay based on his novel Bar Flaubert sponsored by the program "GRAFI" of the Greek National Film Center
- 2007–09 – Storm. Original screenplay for a Haris Patramanis film
- 2014 – Light director-screenwriter Vassilis Douvlis. Script editor.

== Ipad applications ==
- 2012 Conceived and wrote the text for the iPad application "itravel Us" developed by Top Creations and Propaganda

== Awards ==
- 1994 – 1st award of the City of Athens in memory of the Greek poet Nikiforos Vrettakos for his second book of poetry: "Architecture of the Intimate Spaces" Athens, 16 March 1994.
- 2004 – Greek Fulbright Artists & Art-Scholars Award
- 2007 – Etruscan Press won the 1st International Literary Award by the US National Endowment of Arts for Alexis Stamatis' novel American Fugue
- 2009 – First Award of The Circle of the Greek Children's Book- IBBY Greece, for his children's book Alkis and the Labyrinth
