= Aris Alexandrou =

Greek novelist, poet, and translator (1922–1978)

- Born: Αριστοτέλης Βασιλειάδης; 24 November 1922; Leningrad, Soviet Union
- Died: 2 July 1978 (aged 55); Paris, France
- Education: Athens University of Economics and Business
- Occupations: Novelist, poet, translator
- Writing career
- Pen name: Aristotelis Vasiliadis
- Notable work: To kivotio (Mission Box)

Aris Alexandrou (Greek: Άρης Αλεξάνδρου; real name: Αριστοτέλης Βασιλειάδης, Aristotelis Vasiliadis; 24 November 1922 – 2 July 1978) was a Greek novelist, poet and translator. Always on the Left and always unconventional ("I belong to the non-existent party of poets"), he is the author of a single novel (To kivotio – Mission Box) which is widely considered to be among the classic modern Greek works in the second half of the 20th century.

== Life ==
Alexandrou was born in Leningrad to a Greek father (Vasilis Vasiliadis) and a Russian mother (Polina Antovna Vilgelmson). Aristotle Vasiliadis (who at that time had yet not adopted the name Aris Alexandrou) and his parents moved to Greece in 1928, initially residing in Thessaloniki and shortly thereafter in Athens.

He completed high school in 1940, taking the university entrance exam at the engineering school (following his father's wishes) and failing. After that, he was admitted to the Athens University of Economics and Business. In 1942 he decided to drop out of the university and devote himself to work as a translator.

At the same time, he joined a small resistance group (this was the time of the Nazi occupation of Greece). This small group was integrated in the communist youth resistance movement; Alexandrou was not able to cope with the hierarchical organization of the communist party and therefore left the party a few months later.

The fact that he was no longer actively involved in the Party did not stop the British authorities (after the liberation of Greece and their installation there as a de facto ruler) from arresting him and sending to the El Tampa camp, wherein he remained up to April 1945. Furthermore, even though he did not participate in the ensuing Greek Civil War (1946–1949) he was arrested due to his refusal to disavow his political beliefs. From July 1948 up to October 1951 he was exiled to the camps of Moudros, Makronisos and Agios Efstratios.

In November 1952 he was court-martialled for draft-dodging (while he was in exile). The initial verdict was 10 years in prison; Alexandrou did time in the prisons of Averof, Aegina and Gyaros. The review board reduced his sentence down to 7 years, and he was finally discharged in August 1958.

After being discharged from prison he married Kaiti Drosou. In 1967 (after the junta of April 21) they decided to move to Paris to avoid possible new arrests.

Alexandrou died in Paris on July 2, 1978, from a heart attack, having lived to see his only novel published in French translation.

== Poetry, prose and translations ==
Many of Alexandrou's poems were written while he was in exile, and focus on socialism, writing, as well as more personal issues. Mayakovsky's influence is strong and made explicit.

His only novel (Mission Box) is about the Greek civil war, ostensibly still going on in September 1949. However the locations mentioned are fictitious. The setting is the following: A team of soldiers on the communist side (which was fighting against the government side) had to carry out an all-important operation: to transport a mission box from one city to another. The mission goes haywire, and at the end the narrator (who was a member of this team) is arrested (not knowing by whom, but initially assuming that it was by "his" side). The book is made up of the "apology" that he writes out on a daily basis on the sheets of paper that his captors provide him with.

Mission Box is also very interesting for its elaborate prose. The last chapter is a 45-page long sentence (and actually a question since it ends with a question mark) reminiscent of the final chapter of Ulysses.

Most of Alexandrou's translations are from the Russian: this was how Alexandrou made ends meet throughout most of his life. His translations consisted mainly of prose writings (Dostoyevsky, Gorky, Ehrenburg among many others) but he also translated poems (for example Mayakovsky, Akhmatova).

== Works ==
- 1975: To Kivotio, Kedros Publ., Athens—English translation: Mission Box, Kedros Publ., Athens, 1996
- 1978: Poems (1941–1974), Ypsilon Publ., Athens
- 1984: Dialexa, Agra Publ., Athens (Greek translation by Alexandrou of miscellaneous poems; edited by Kaiti Drosou)
