= Lefteris Poulios =

Greek poet

- Born: 1944 (age 81–82); Athens, Greece
- Occupation: poet
- Writing career
- Period: 1969–present

Lefteris Poulios (Greek: Λευτέρης Πούλιος; born 1944) is a Greek poet.

He belongs to the so-called 1970s Generation, which is a literary term referring to Greek authors who began publishing their work during the 1970s, and especially towards the end of the Greek military junta of 1967–74 and at the first years of the Metapolitefsi.

== Works ==
- Ποίηση (Poetry), 1969
- Ποίηση 2 (Poetry 2), 1973
- Ποίηση 1, 2 (Poetry 1, 2), 1975
- Ο Γυμνός Ομιλητής (The Nude Orator), 1977
- Το αλληγορικό σχολείο (The Allegorical School), 1978
- Τα ποιήματα Επιλογή 1969–1978 (Collected Poems 1969–1978), 1982
- Ενάντια (Anti), 1983
- Αντί της σιωπής (Instead of Silence), 1993
- Το διπλανό δωμάτιο (The next door room), 1998
- Tο Μωσαϊκό (The Mosaic), 2001
