= Haris Vlavianos =

Greek poet

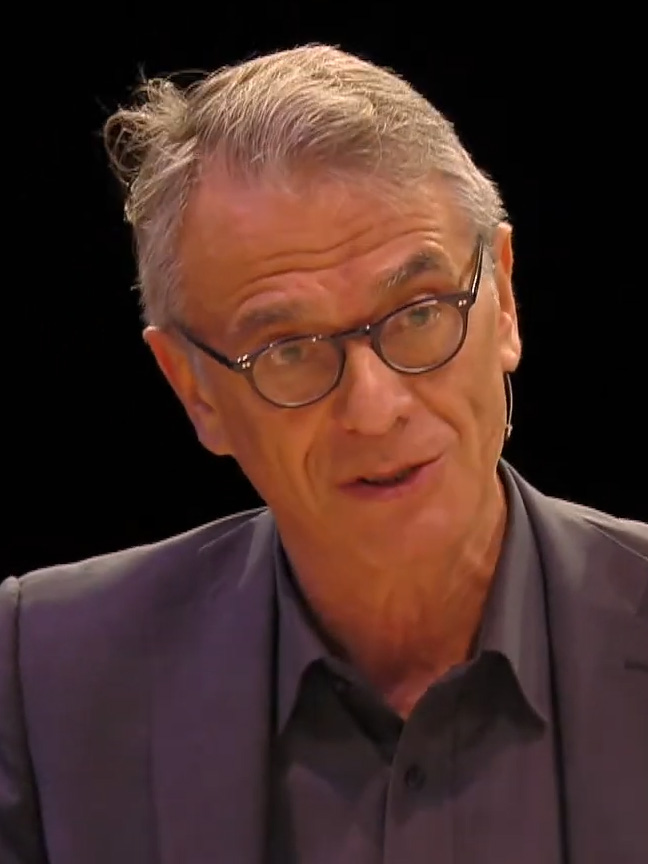
Vlavianos in 2021

Haris Vlavianos (Greek: Χάρης Βλαβιανός; born 1957), is a contemporary Greek poet.

== Biography ==
Haris Vlavianos was born in Rome. He studied Economics and Philosophy at the University of Bristol (B. Sc) and History (M. Phil, D. Phil) at the University of Oxford (Trinity College). His doctoral thesis entitled, Greece 1941-1949: From Resistance to Civil War, was published by Macmillan (1992).

He has published twelve collections of poetry, including Vacations in Reality (2009) Sonnets of Despair (2011), [Short-listed for the National Poetry Prize] and Self-Portrait of White (2018) [National Poetry Prize, Poetry Prize of the Academy of Athens, Critics’ Poetry Prize].

Other books of his include, The History of Western Philosophy in 100 Haiku (2011), Blood into water (2013), Hitler’s Secret Diary: Landsberg Prison, November 1923- December 1924 (2016), It’s my turn to speak now (2019), Platonic Dialogues (2021).

He has translated in book form the works of well-known American and European poets such as: Walt Whitman, Ezra Pound, T.S. Eliot, William Blake, John Ashbery, Zbigniew Herbert, Fernando Pessoa, E. E. Cummings, Michael Longley, Wallace Stevens, Adam Zagajewski, Emily Dickinson, Louise Glück, and Anne Carson.

Poems of his have been translated in many European languages and collections and books of his have been published in England, France, Germany, Sweden, Italy, Holland, Ireland, Spain, Rumania and Bulgaria.

For his contribution in promoting Italian literature and culture in Greece, the President of the Italian Republic bestowed upon him in February 2005 the title of “Cavaliere”, while the Dante Society of Italy awarded him the “Dante Prize” for his publications on the Divine Comedy.

He is the editor of the literary journal “Poetics”, which was awarded a State Commendation by the Greek Ministry of Culture.

He is Professor of History and Politics at the American College of Greece and Editor at Patakis Publishers.

== Poetry ==
- Ὑπνοβασίες ("Somnambulations") 1983. Greek
- Πωλητής θαυμάτων ("Pedlar of Miracles") 1985. Greek
- Τρόπος τοῦ λέγειν ("In a Manner of Speaking") 1986. Greek
- Η Νοσταλγία των Ουρανών ("The Nostalgia of the Skies") 1991. Greek
- Adieu. Nefeli, 1996. ISBN 960-211-245-X Greek

- Adieu. Centre for Byzantine, Ottoman and Modern Greek Studies; University of Birmingham, 1998. ISBN 0-7044-1886-X Greek and English.

- Ο Άγγελος της Ιστορίας ("The Angel of History") Nefeli, Athens 1999. ISBN 960-211-436-3 Greek

- Der Engel der Geschichte. Romiosini Verlag, Cologne 2001. ISBN 3-929889-48-X German translation

- Μετά το Τέλος της Ομορφιάς ("After the End of Beauty") Nefeli, Athens, 2003. ISBN 960-211-672-2 Greek

- Nach dem Ende der Schonheit. Edition Lyrik Kabinett bei Hanser, Munich 2007. ISBN 3-446-20871-2 German translation

- Affirmation: Selected Poems 1986–2006. Dedalus, Dublin 2007. ISBN 1-904556-65-5
- Διακοπές στην πραγματικότητα ("Vacation in Reality") Patakis, Athens, 2009. ISBN 978-960-16-3247-6
- Σονέτα της συμφοράς ("Sonnets of Despair"), Patakis, Athens, 2011. ISBN 978-960-16-4126-3
- Αυτοπροσωπογραφία του λευκού ("Self-Portrait of White"), Patakis, Athens, 2018 ISBN 978-960-16-7835-1
