= Asmodeus (comics) =

Asmodeus, in comics, may refer to:

- Asmodeus (Marvel Comics), a Marvel Comics character
- Asmodeus, a character in the manga series Angel Sanctuary
- Asmodeus, a character in the webcomic Megatokyo
- Alice Asmodeus, a character in the manga series Welcome to Demon School! Iruma-kun

== See also ==
- Asmodeus (disambiguation)
