= Emmanuel Rhoides =

Greek writer (1836–1904)

- Ἐμμανουὴλ Ῥοΐδης
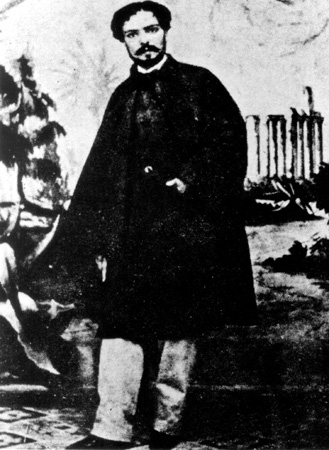
- Born: 28 June 1836; Ermoupolis, Greece
- Died: 7 January 1904 (aged 67); Athens, Greece
- Occupations: Writer, journalist, translator
- Writing career
- Notable work: The Papess Joanne
- Literary movement: New Athenian School

Emmanuel Rhoides (Greek: Ἐμμανουὴλ Ῥοΐδης; 28 June 1836 – 7 January 1904) was a Greek writer, journalist, and translator. He is considered one of the most influential writers of 19th century Greece and a significant figure of Modern Greek literature. His most popular work, The Papess Joanne, was translated in several languages earning him international recognition throughout Europe. His complete literary corpus includes novels, short stories, essays, and translations.

== Biography ==
Rhoides was born in 1836 in Hermoupolis, the capital of the Aegean island of Syros, to a family of rich aristocrats from Chios—Demetrios (Δημήτριος) Rhoides and Kornelia (née Rhodokanakes; Κορνηλία Ῥοδοκανάκη)—who had fled the island after the massacre of its population by the Ottomans in 1822. Rhoides spent much of his youth abroad. An erudite student, he began to master from a young age several European languages, as well as ancient Greek and Latin. In 1841, his family moved to Genoa, Italy where his father served as an honorary Greek consul. During this time, he witnessed the Revolutions of 1848 in the Italian states and the revolt of Genoa; events that left a mark on him, as he later acknowledged. At 13 years old, was sent back to Syros, where he attended the Greek-American highschool of Evangelides. There he published a weekly handwritten newspaper called "Melissa", along with his classmate and future writer, Demetrios Vikelas.

After graduating highschool in 1855, Rhoides settled in Berlin in pursuit of higher education, as well as treatment for the hearing problem he had developed during his school years. In Berlin, he studied history, literature, and philosophy. Due to the deterioration of his hearing, he moved to Iași, Romania in 1857, where his merchant father had transferred the headquarters of his business, and worked in the correspondence of his uncle's trading company. He secretly began working on the translation of Chateaubriand's Itinéraire de Paris à Jérusalem, which his uncle discovered and urged him to publish. The complete translation of Chateaubriand's Itineraire (Odoiporikon), along with a few more of his works, were eventually published in Athens, where he moved with his family a few years later. The success of his Itineraire in the early 1860s strengthened the author's desire to pursue a career in letters. He would later go on to write numerous translations, and became the first to translate the works of Edgar Allan Poe into Greek. The family briefly stayed in Egypt for the treatment of his mother, but after his father's sudden death in 1862, Rhoides' brother stayed in Genoa, while he and Kornelia decided to move permanently to Athens, where the author devoted himself to the pursuit of letters.

In 1866 Rhoides published his most popular work, The Papess Joanne (Ἡ Πάπισσα Ἰωάννα), an exploration of the European legend of Pope Joan, a supposed female pope who reigned some time in the late ninth century, a time of great turmoil for the papacy. He first heard about the legend in Genoa as a child and, intrigued by the story, he did extensive research in Germany, Italy, and Greece, collecting important material for his novel. Though a romance with satirical overtones, Rhoides titled his work a "medieval study" and asserted it contained conclusive evidence that Pope Joan had truly existed. Initially controversial, the novel was eventually established as a classic and one of the few comic masterpieces of Modern Greek literature. It was admired by Mark Twain and Alfred Jarry and freely translated by Lawrence Durrell as The Curious History of Pope Joan in 1954.

In the following years, Rhoides worked with French-language newspapers, and in 1870 he became director of the newspapers La Grèce and L'Independence Hellenique. A philologist, Rhoides was not interested in finances, as a result the family property began to collapse. In 1873 he lost almost all of his fortune that he had invested in shares of the Lavrio Company. Following the bankruptcy of the family business, his beloved brother Nicholas committed suicide in 1884. Fearing her reaction, Rhoides did not reveal the news to his mother and kept sending her letters through a friend from Italy under his brother's name. Rhoides suffered all through his life from a serious hearing problem, which eventually impaired his sense to near deafness.

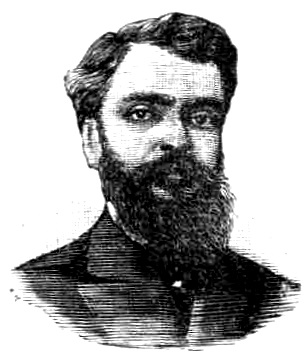
A sketch of Rhoides from the calendar Hemerologion Skokou (1889).

He continued to write frequently in many newspapers and magazines, and between 1875 and 1885 he published his own satirical newspaper called Asmodaios, along with his friend and cartoonist, Themos Anninos. Signing his articles with various pseudonyms, he commented on the public and political life of Greece and often sided with the policies of Charilaos Trikoupis. In 1877, starting with his article titled "On Contemporary Greek Poetry", he entered in a public dispute with politician and writer Aggelos Vlachos regarding the influences and character of contemporary Greek poetry. Rhoides often adopted a clear-cut critical stance against the romanticism in literature and poetry, and was often poignant and sarcastic to the romantic writers and poets of his time. He published a series of essays, where he supported for the use of the Demotic language, even though he himself wrote his texts in the literary language of Katharevousa. He considered the vernacular Demotic to be equal to Katharevousa in richness, precision, and clarity and advocated for the merging of the two in one language, so as to avoid the diglossia of the time.

In 1878 he was appointed director of the National Library of Greece, where he worked during the governments of Trikoupis, and was dismissed by the governments of Theodoros Deligiannis. In 1885 he had a serious accident when he was hit by a carriage, which left him unable to speak for months, and by 1890 he lost his hearing permanently. In the period 1890–1900, he published most of his purely narrative work, which includes several short stories. Until the end of his life he collaborated with many magazines and newspapers of the time, in which he published short stories and articles. He died in Athens on January 7 1904.

== Quotes ==
- "Each place suffers from something, England from fog, Romania from locusts, Egypt from eye diseases, and Greece from the Greeks." - Emmanuel Rhoides

== Sources ==
- Rhoides, Emmanuel (2008). Συριανά Διηγήματα [Short Stories from Syros] (in Greek). Project Gutenberg.
- Marvelos, Nikolaos (2018). Roidis' tangible images and Baudelaire's paintings of modern life. Aspects of Modernity in Emmanouíl Roidis' works. LAP Lambert Academic Publishing. ISBN 978-613-9-58290-7.
- Dragoumis, Mark (2004). "Roidis' delightful irreverence". Athens News. Archived from the original on 2007-09-27.
- Sfakianaki, Ioanna (2021). "Η θυελλώδης και πολυτάραχη ζωή της Κορνηλίας Ροδοκανάκη - Ροΐδη" [The stormy and turbulent life of Cornelia Rodokanakis - Roidis] (in Greek).
