= Lavrion miners strike =

Lavrion miners strike was a strike action in the mines of Lavrion, Greece in 1896, that resulted in violent clashes between the strikers on the one side and the mining company's guards, the police and the army on the other side. Four workers and several guards of the mining company were killed during the fights. The strike ended with a slight increase in the workers' daily wage and with a military force being established permanently to oversee the miners.

== Background ==
The mines of Lavrion, having been shut down since antiquity, started operating again during the 1860s, under the authority of a French-Italian mining company named "Roux - Serpieri - Fressynet C.E.". The mining activities brought many workers from other parts of Greece as well as from other countries, mostly from Italy and Spain, to Lavrion. However, the labor conditions of the workers were awful: the miners worked 7 days per week for 12-14 hours per day for a wage of 2.5 drachma, no medical care was provided for them and injured often died on the way to the hospital. Many of the miners lived in caves or self-made huts.

As a result, the mines were a theater of many labor conflicts with numerous strikes taking place. The most notable of these were in 1880, 1882–1883, 1887, 1891 and 1895, and some were bloodily suppressed. The mobilizations were mainly influenced by the anarcho-syndicalist and socialist ideas of politicized foreign workers.

== The strike ==
On April 7, 1896, the miners (1800 in number) climbed up from the galleries of the mines, sealed all exits and declared a strike. Their demands were increases in their wage, medical care, creation of a hospital nearby, abolition of the contractors who kept part of the workers' wage, housing for all workers and the establishment of Sunday as a holiday. The strikers were peaceful and approached the company's offices to negotiate with the management, but they were shot at by the company's guards to which the strikers responded by throwing rocks. Two miners were killed by the guards' fire in the ensuing fight. The workers, at the sight of their dead companions, attacked the company's office with dynamite killing all the guards that were inside, but one. The director of the mines, Giovanni Serpieri, run away disguised as a priest.

In the following days the government sent police forces against the miners, who nevertheless continued their strike. Seeing the strikers refusing to back down caused the government to send a military force accompanied by a war ship. A new round of clashes started in which two more workers fell and another one died later of his injuries. Fifteen more were arrested, with warrants having been issued for more, who had managed to flee. Following the repression, the strike ended on 21st of April.

== Aftermath ==
The strikers managed only a slight increase in their wages from 2.5 to 3.5 drachma and the mining activities continued under the supervision of a military unit that settled permanently near the mines.

== Legacy ==
In 1982 a short series of 13 episodes named "Λαυρεωτικά: η μεγάλη απεργία" (Lavreotika: the great strike) aired in the Greek television. The series described both the events of the strike and the legal dispute (and ensuing economic scandal) of 1860s-1870s, known as Lavreotika.
