= Lavrio =

Town in southeastern Attica, Greece

Lavrio Lavrion Laurium Λαύριο/Λαύριον
- Settlement
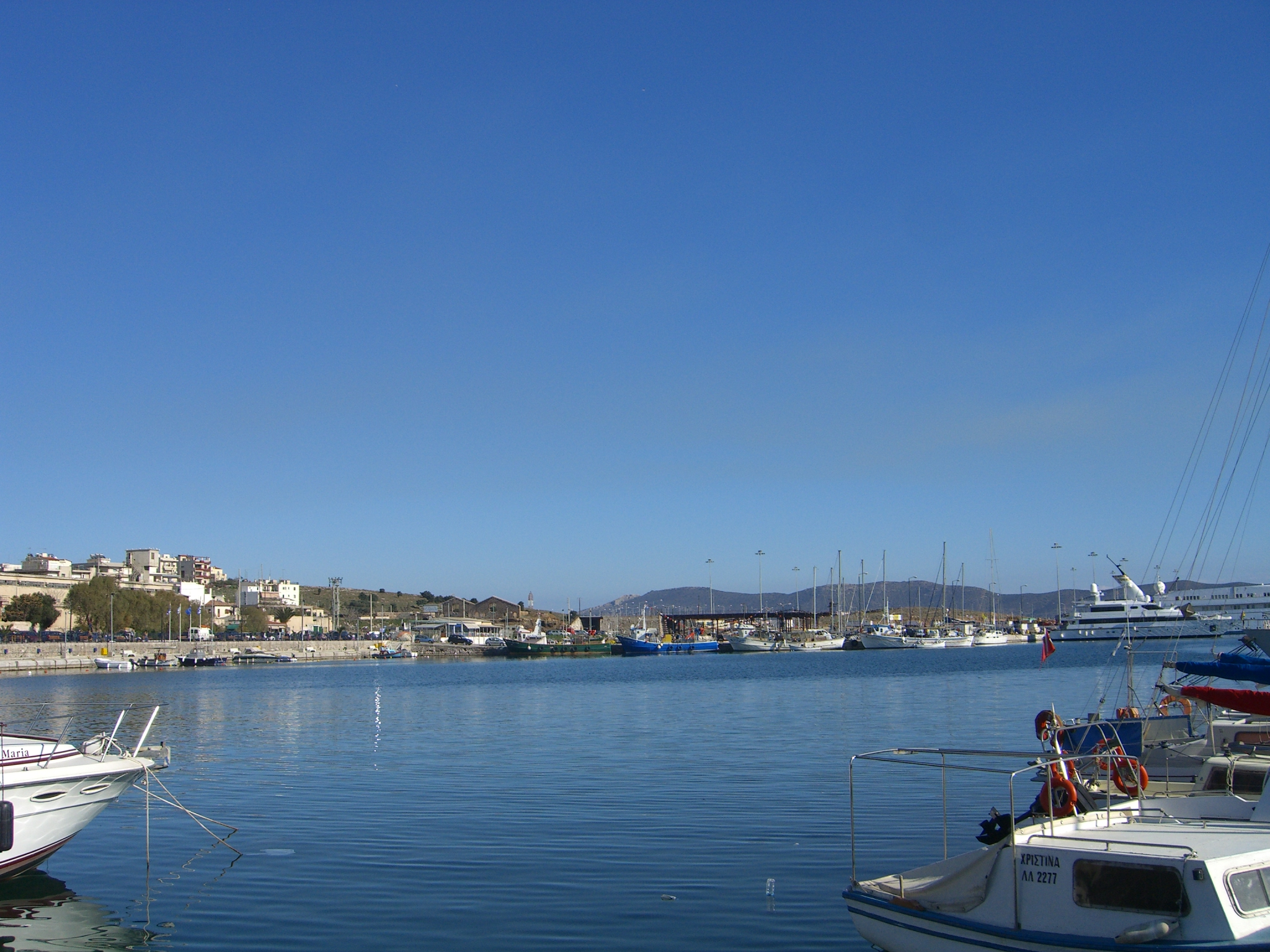
- The port of Lavrio

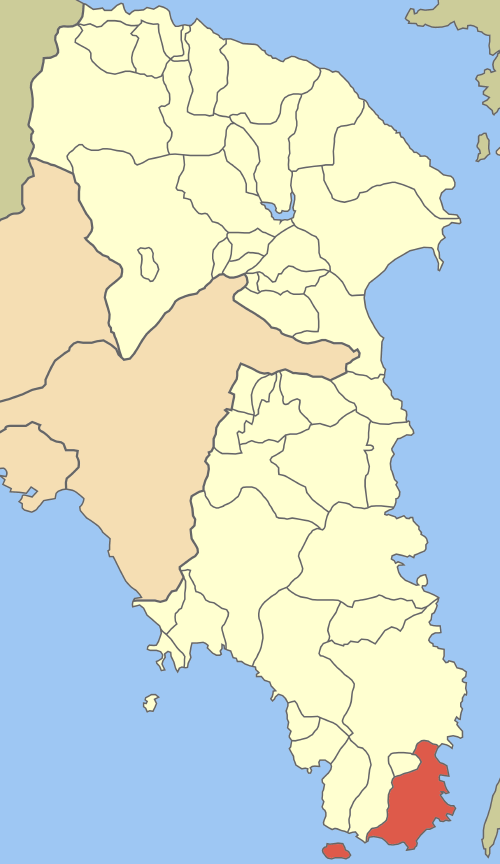
- Location of the Lavreotiki municipal unit

- Location within Greece
- Coordinates: 37°42′N 24°3′E
- Country: Greece
- Administrative region: Attica
- Regional unit: East Attica
- Municipality: Lavreotiki
- Municipal unit: Lavreotiki
- Elevation: 10 m (33 ft)

Population (2021)
  - Total: 7,525
- Time zone: UTC+2 (EET)
  - Summer (DST): UTC+3 (EEST)
- Postal code: 195 xx

Lavrio, Lavrion or Laurium (Greek: Λαύριο; Ancient Greek: Λαύρειον (later Λαύριον); from Middle Ages until 1908: Εργαστήρια Ergastiria) is a town in southeastern part of Attica, Greece. It is part of Athens metropolitan area and the seat of the municipality of Lavreotiki. Laurium was known in Classical antiquity for its silver mines, one of the chief sources of revenue of the Athenian state. The silver was mainly used for coinage. The Archaeological Museum of Lavrion shows much of the story of these mines.

It is about 60 km southeast of Athens city center, on a bay overlooking the island of Makronisos (ancient Helena) to the east. The EO89 road runs through Lavrio.

== History ==
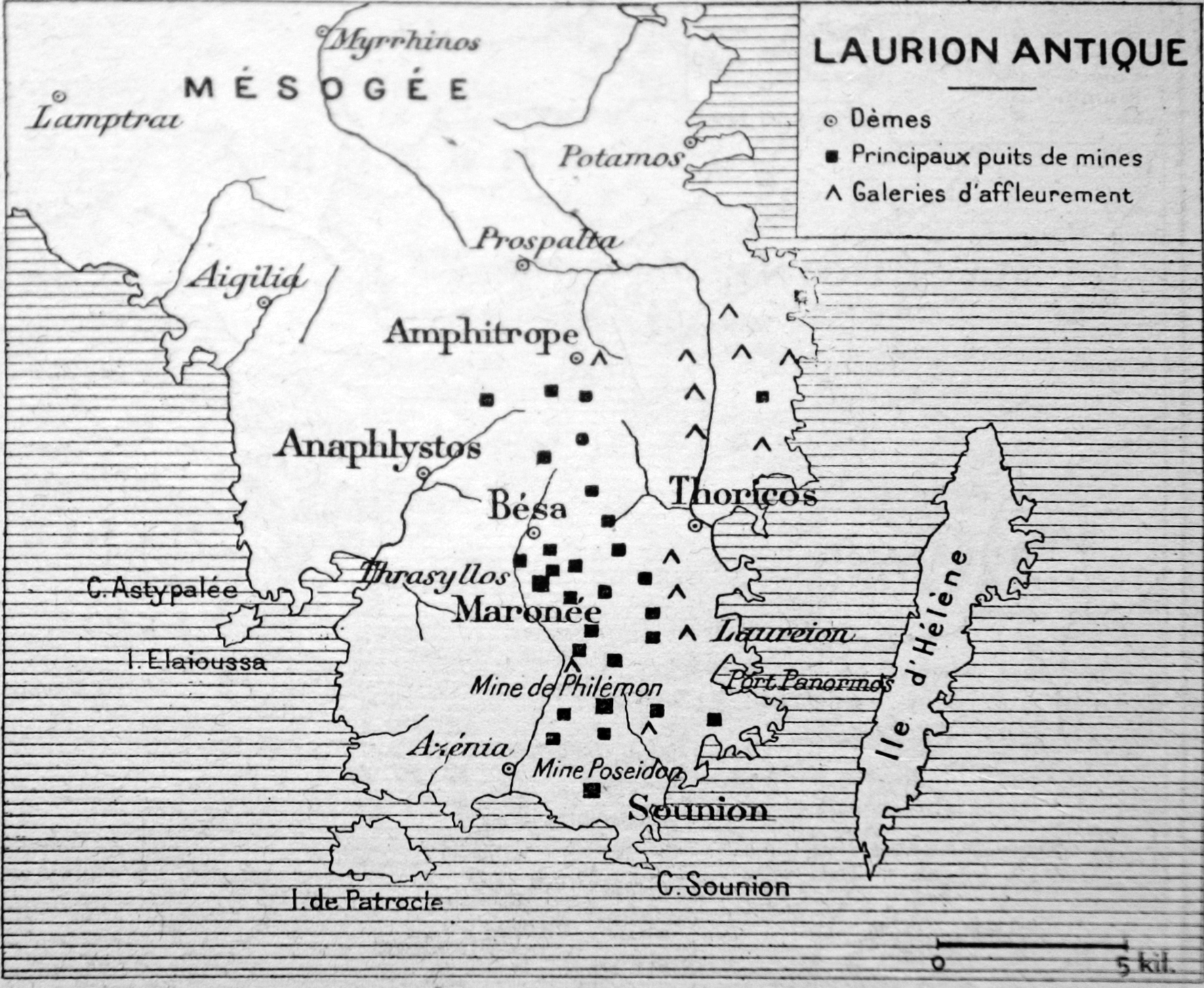
Map of the mines of Laurion

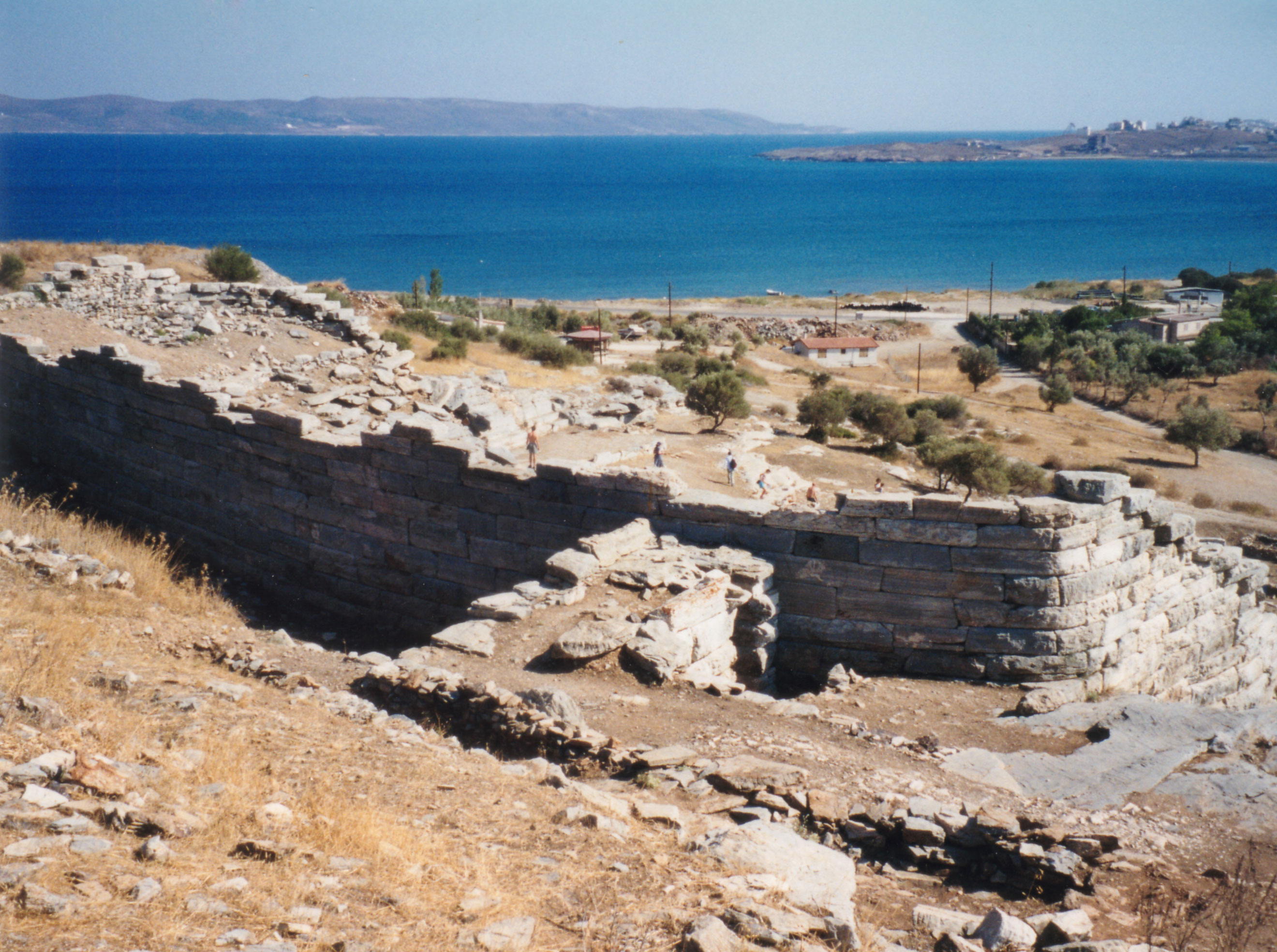
Ruins of the ancient theatre at Thorikos

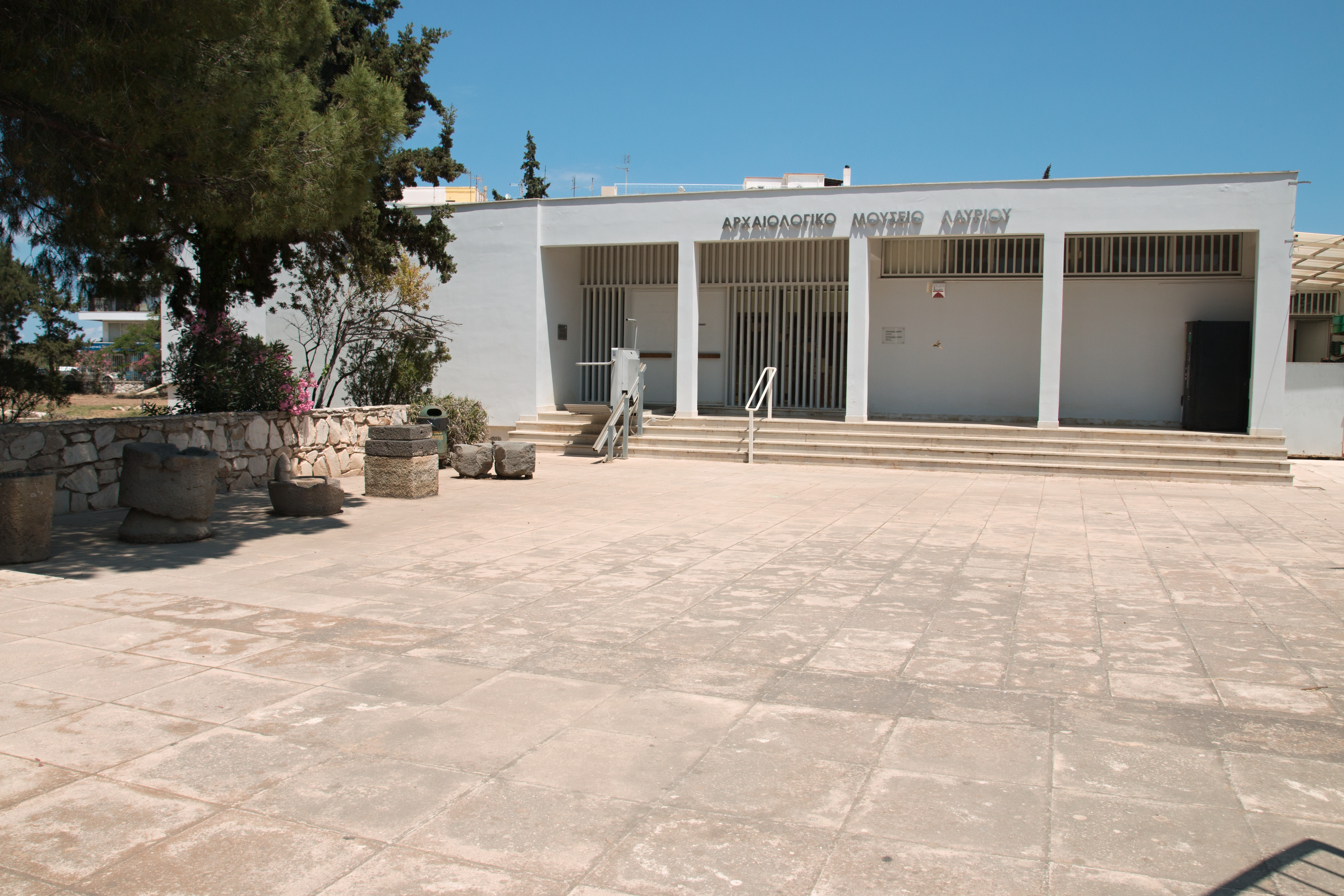
Archaeological Museum of Laurion

The modern town of Lavrio is at the site of the ancient village of Thoricus; its name is taken from that of the entire region of the Mines of Laurium.

The earliest evidence for mining dates to the beginning of the Bronze Age, ca. 3200 BC.

Systematic exploitation of mineral resources seem to have begun in the 6th century BC under Peisistratus. After the battle of Marathon, Themistocles persuaded the Athenians to devote the anticipated revenue derived from a major silver vein strike in the mines of Laurion circa 483 BC to expanding the Athenian fleet to 200 triremes, and thus laid the foundation of the Athenian naval power. The mines, which were the property of the state, were usually farmed out for a certain fixed sum and a percentage on the working; slave labour was exclusively employed.

Towards the end of the 5th century, the output fell, partly owing to the Spartan occupation of Decelea. But the mines continued to be worked, though Strabo records that in his time the tailings were being worked over, and Pausanias speaks of the mines as a thing of the past. The ancient workings, consisting of shafts and galleries for excavating the ore, and washing tables for concentrating the ore, are still visible in places.

The mines were reworked in the late 19th century by French and Greek companies, but mainly for lead, manganese and cadmium. In 1896 a strike from the miners was violently confronted by the mining company's guards resulting in the death of two workers. The miners responded by destroying the company's offices and killing the guards. The government then sent police forces to support the company's interests against the strikers. Further clashes between workers and the police occurred to which the government replied by sending the military against the striking workers resulting in more workers' deaths. The strike ended violently with most of the strikers' demands not being fulfilled and with a military force being permanently established to patrol the miners.

The Mineralogical Museum of Lavrion comprises samples of minerals from the region of Lavrion.

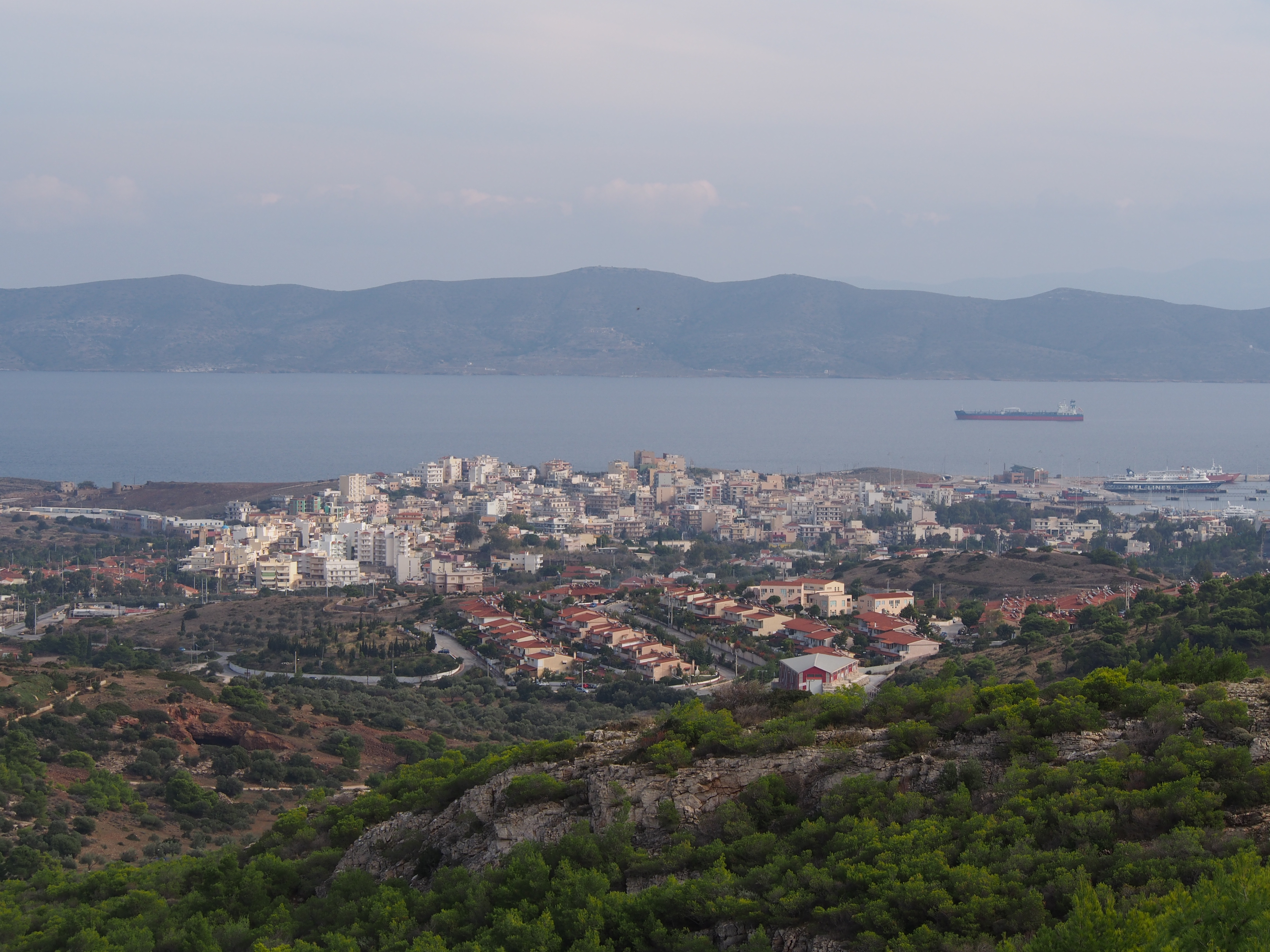
Panorama

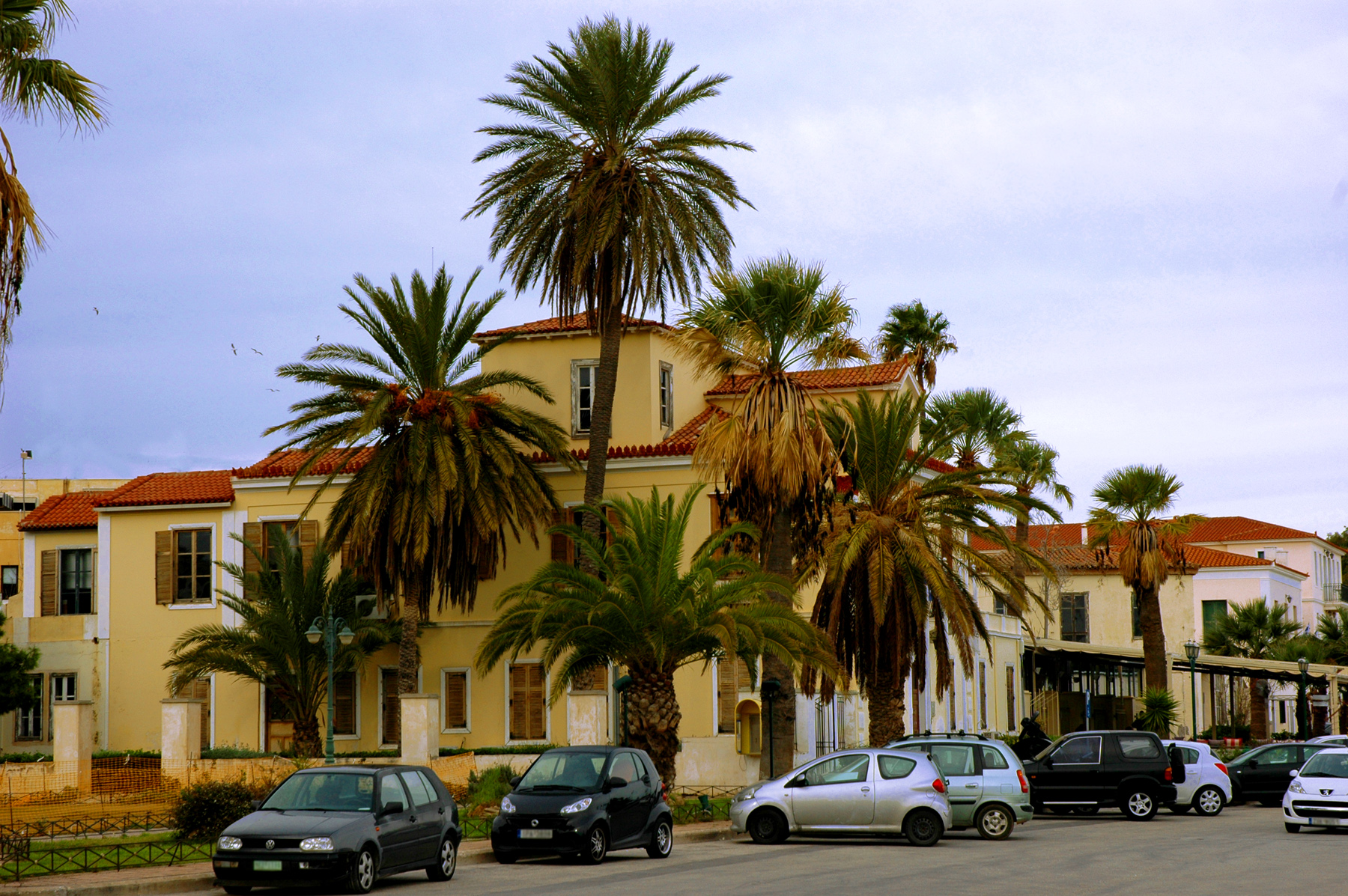
Modern Lavrio

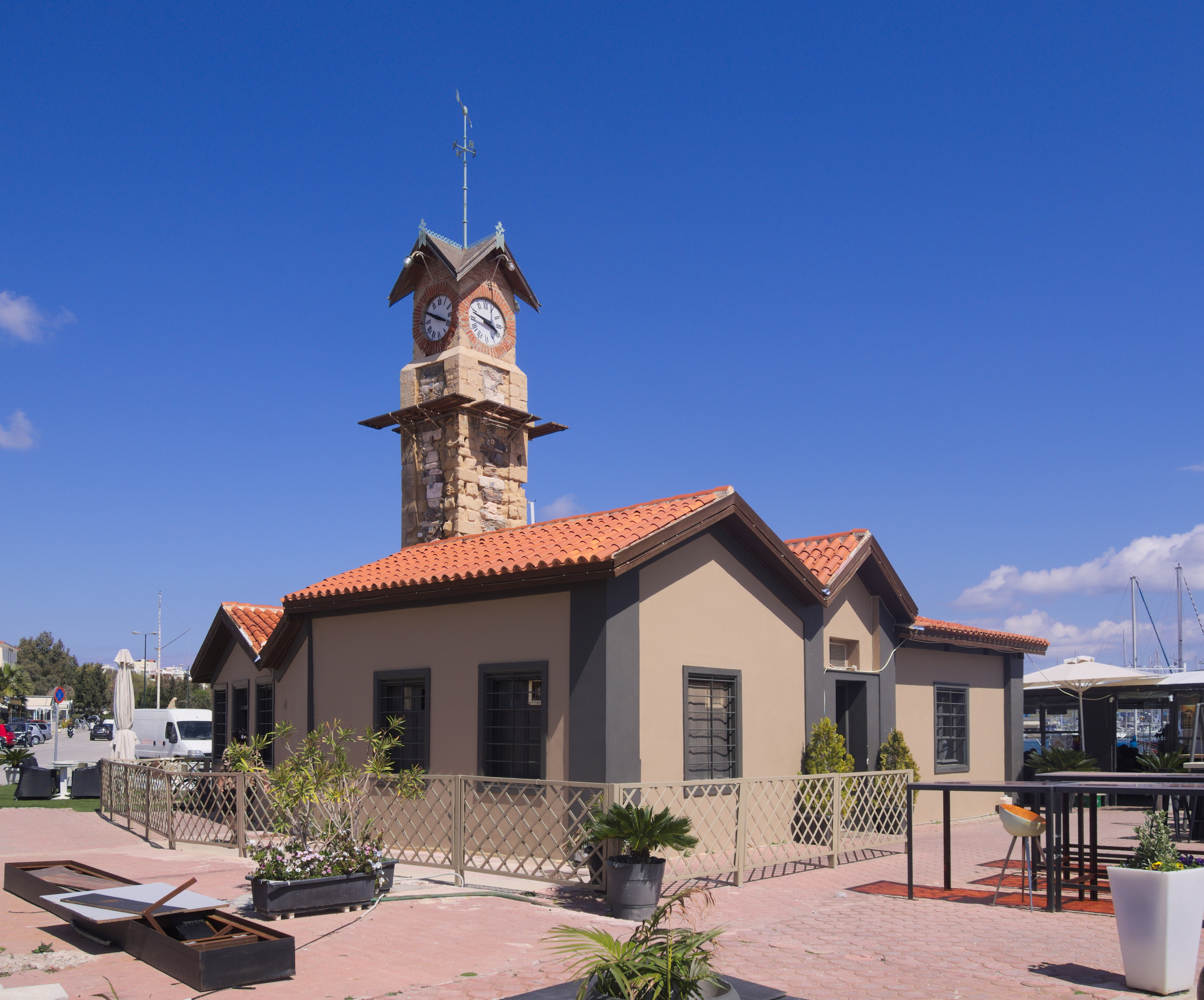
Clocktower

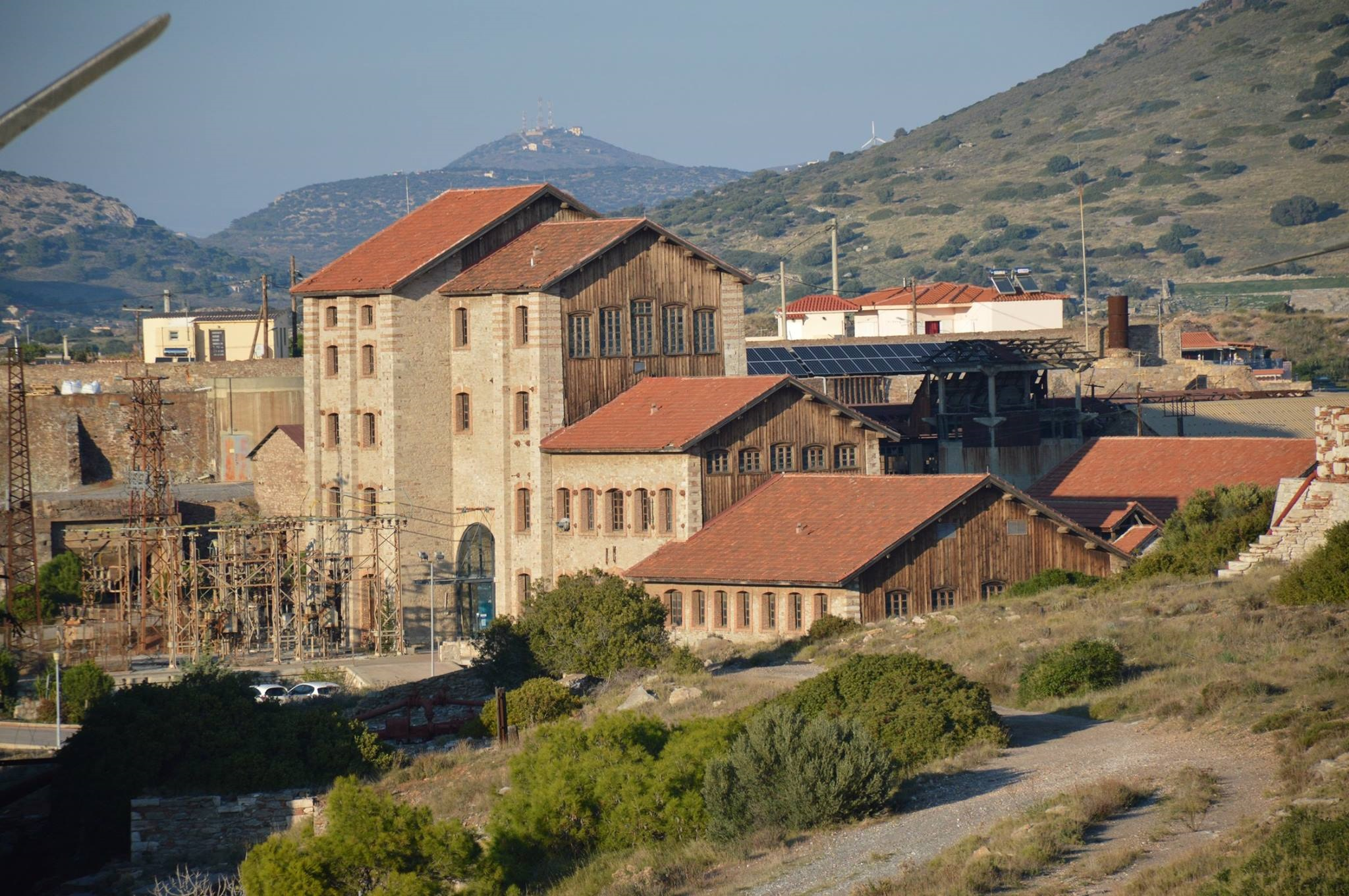
Technological park

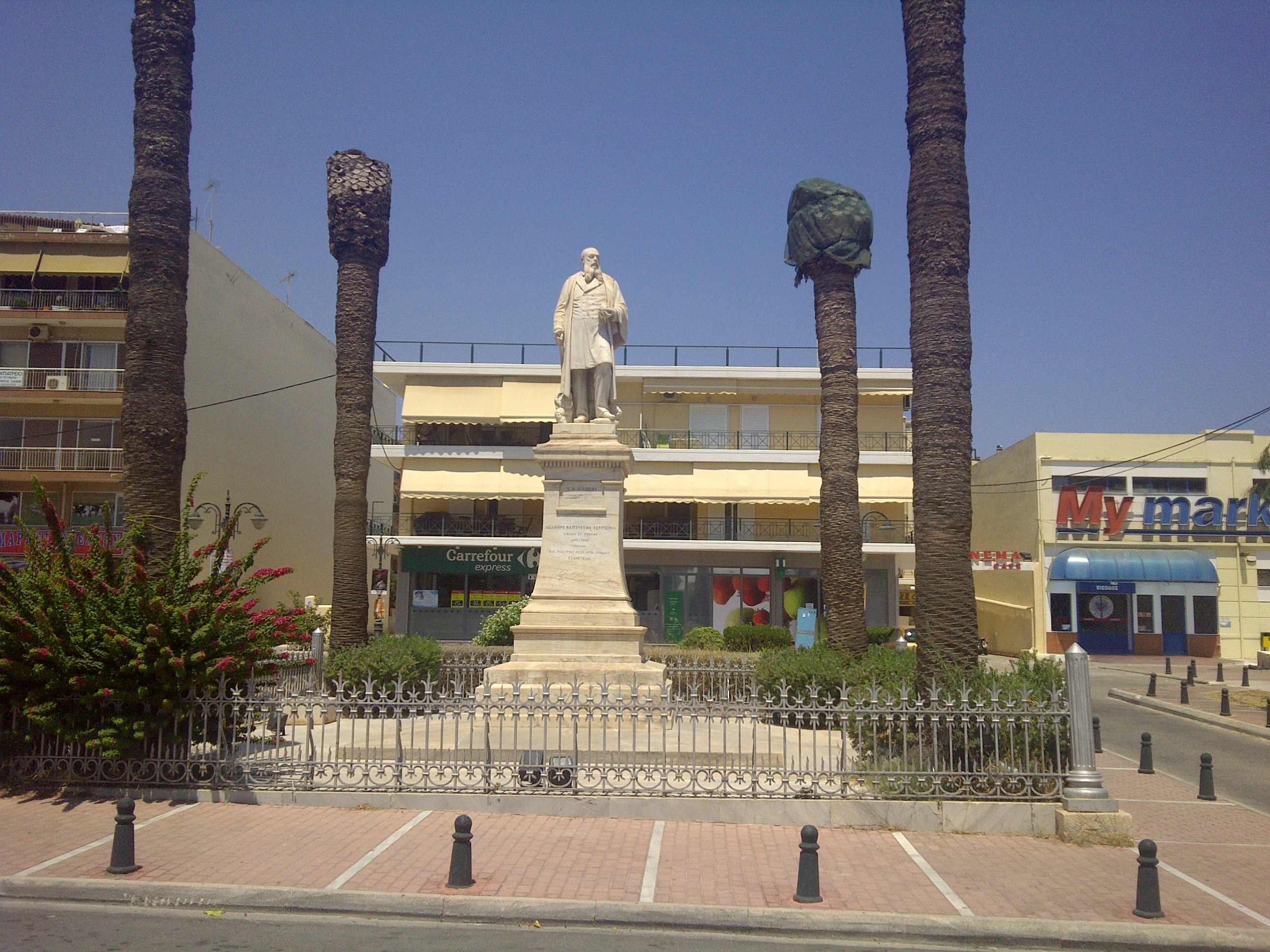
Statue of 19th-century Italian industrialist Giovanni Battista Serpieri, active here in the mines (sculp. Georgios Vroutos)

== Climate ==
Lavrio, owing to its location in the southern tip of the Athens Riviera, has a hot semi-arid climate (Köppen climate classification: BSh), closely bordering a hot-summer mediterranean (Csa) climate. It has mild winters and hot summers, with particularly warm summer nights. The summer highs are 2 °C lower than in Piraeus and 4 °C lower than in downtown Athens. The driest months are July and August while the rainiest period is during December and January. Lavrio falls in hardiness zone 10b.

Climate data for Lavrio (2008–2025)
Month	Jan	Feb	Mar	Apr	May	Jun	Jul	Aug	Sep	Oct	Nov	Dec	Year
Record high °C (°F)	22.9 (73.2)	23.1 (73.6)	23.3 (73.9)	27.7 (81.9)	32.8 (91.0)	39.3 (102.7)	42.4 (108.3)	38.2 (100.8)	38.7 (101.7)	33.1 (91.6)	27.4 (81.3)	23.7 (74.7)	42.4 (108.3)
Mean daily maximum °C (°F)	14.2 (57.6)	14.9 (58.8)	16.7 (62.1)	19.9 (67.8)	24.3 (75.7)	28.8 (83.8)	31.3 (88.3)	30.8 (87.4)	27.6 (81.7)	23 (73)	19.5 (67.1)	15.9 (60.6)	22.2 (72.0)
Daily mean °C (°F)	11.3 (52.3)	12 (54)	13.5 (56.3)	16.4 (61.5)	20.7 (69.3)	25.3 (77.5)	28.1 (82.6)	28 (82)	24.7 (76.5)	20.2 (68.4)	16.8 (62.2)	13.1 (55.6)	19.2 (66.5)
Mean daily minimum °C (°F)	8.5 (47.3)	9 (48)	10.3 (50.5)	12.9 (55.2)	17.1 (62.8)	21.7 (71.1)	25 (77)	25.2 (77.4)	21.7 (71.1)	17.4 (63.3)	14.1 (57.4)	10.3 (50.5)	16.1 (61.0)
Record low °C (°F)	0.1 (32.2)	0.6 (33.1)	0.6 (33.1)	5.8 (42.4)	10.8 (51.4)	14.8 (58.6)	19.9 (67.8)	19.6 (67.3)	14.3 (57.7)	8.8 (47.8)	6.6 (43.9)	2.4 (36.3)	0.1 (32.2)
Average rainfall mm (inches)	68.3 (2.69)	47.6 (1.87)	37 (1.5)	19.6 (0.77)	6 (0.2)	10.6 (0.42)	2.8 (0.11)	0.3 (0.01)	22.5 (0.89)	28.6 (1.13)	56.9 (2.24)	80.5 (3.17)	380.7 (15)
Source 1: National Observatory of Athens Monthly Bulletins (Oct 2008 – Nov 2025)
Source 2: Lavrio N.O.A station

== Sports ==
Laurium hosts the football club Olympiacos Laurium, which played in the Gamma Ethniki in the past, and the basketball club Lavrio B.C., which plays in the Basket League.

Sport clubs based in Laurium
Club	Founded	Sports	Achievements
Olympiacos Laurium	1926	Football	Previous presence in Gamma Ethniki
Lavrio B.C.	1990	Basketball	Current presence in Basket League

== Twin towns ==
- Aleksinac, Serbia
- Mangalia, Romania

== See also ==
- List of municipalities of Attica

== Sources ==
- Édouard Ardaillon, "Les Mines du Laurion dans l'antiquité", No. Ixxvii. of the Bibliothéque des Ecoles francaises d'Athênes et de Rome.
