= Mineralogical Museum of Lavrion =

Museum in Lavrion, Greece

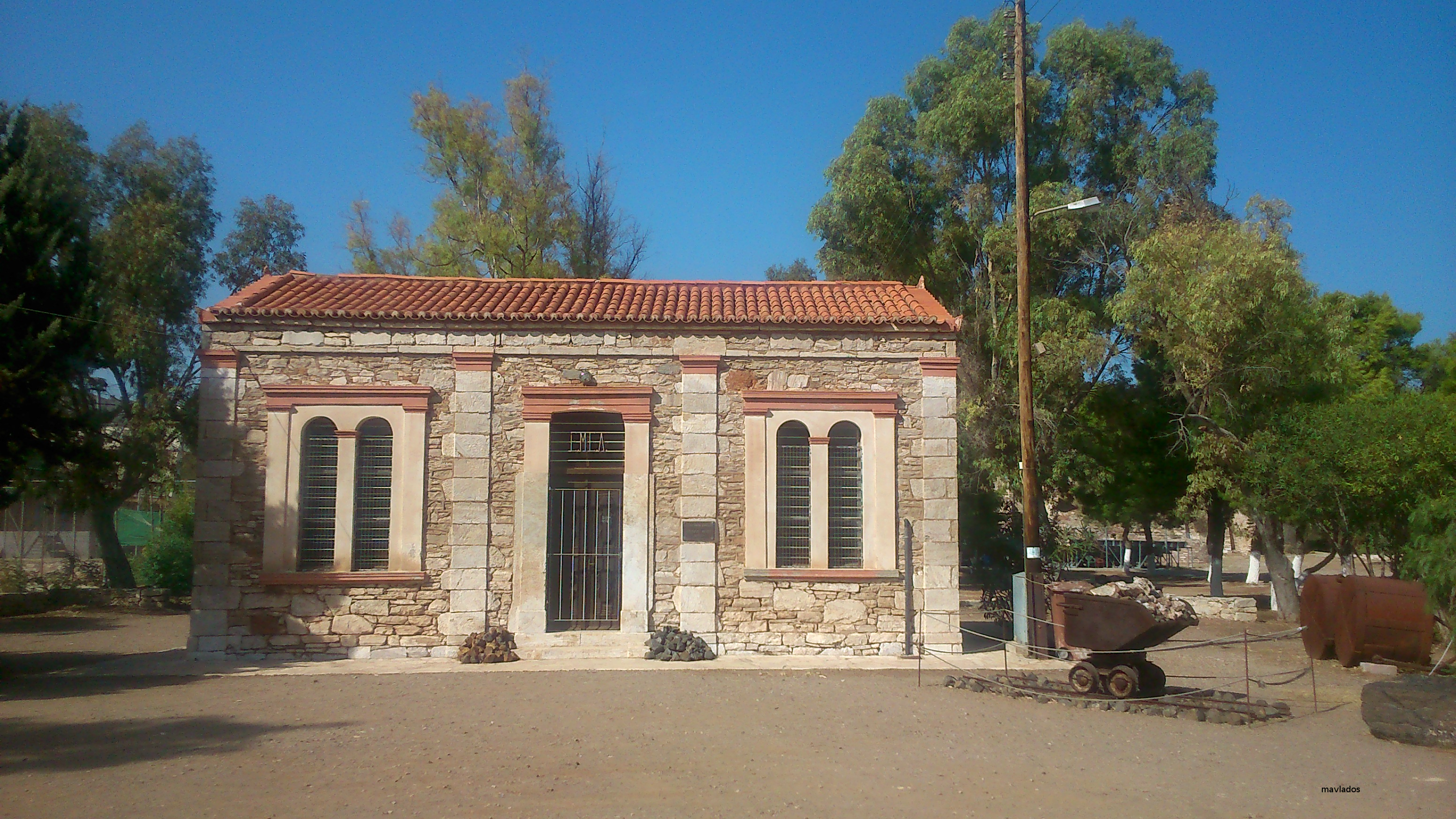
The Mineralogical museum of Lavrion

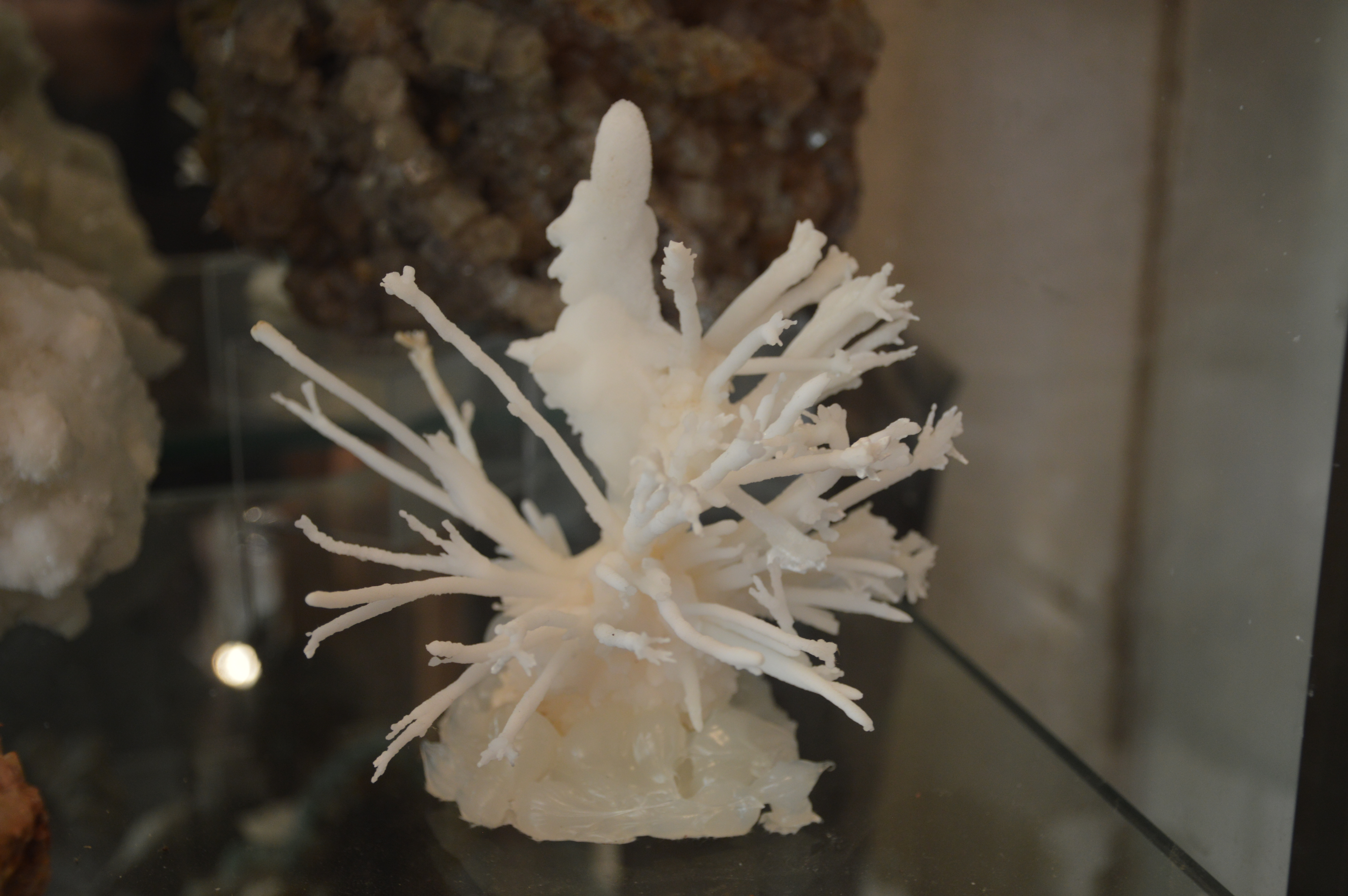
Aragonite

Mineralogical Museum of Lavrion is a museum in Lavrion, Attica, Greece.37°42′58″N 24°03′04″E)

A brief history of the museum

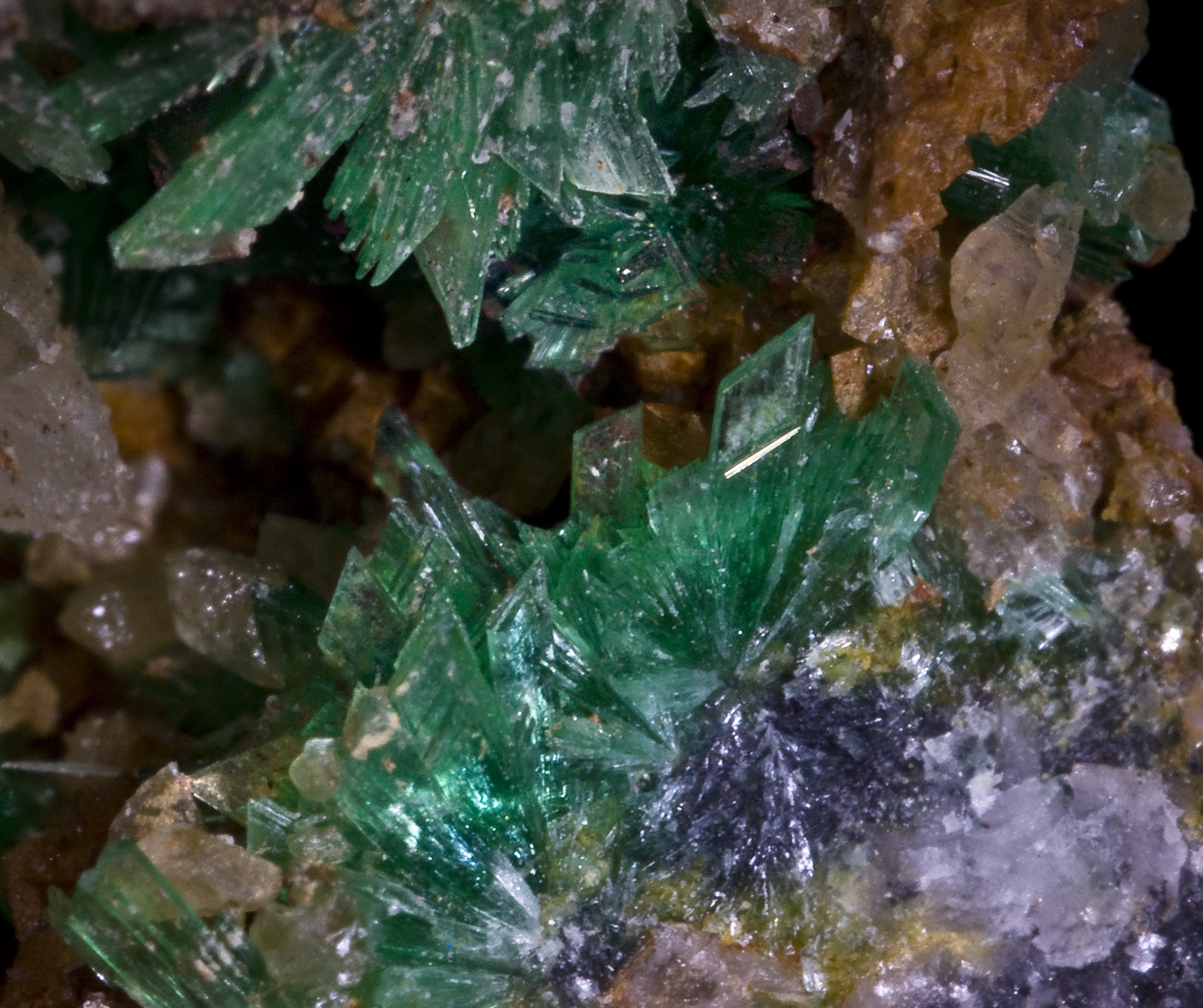
Annabergite

The Mineralogical Museum of Lavrion was inaugurated in 1986 through the efforts of the “Society for Lavrion region Studies” (the Scientific Society of Lavrion, in Greek “Etaireia Meleton Lavreotikis”, E.ME.L.), a non-profit cultural association founded in 1984 and recognized by the Ministry of Culture with the status of a private legal association (Government Gazette No. B/1401/22.10.2001, No. 54), grouping the scientific community of the city and its surroundings. The museum’s premises occupy a small industrial building, built in 1875, which constituted initially a part of the industrial ore washing complex of the “Metallurgical Company of Lavrion” (“Société des Usines du Laurium” or “Hellenic Company”, 1873-1927).

The museum has been dedicated to the memory of Andreas Cordellas, Greek mineralogist (1836-1909), whose scientific work paved the way to the re-exploitation, in the second half of the 19th century, of the ancient mines of Lavrion. His monument, created by the sculptor Irini Chariati (1918-2009), member of E.ME.L., was placed by E.ME.L. at the premises of the museum and unveiled on May 20, 1990.

Compiling the Collection

E.ME.L. commenced in 1984 the effort to compile its mineralogical collection by addressing requests to local families, who, to their knowledge, had in their possession minerals from the region.

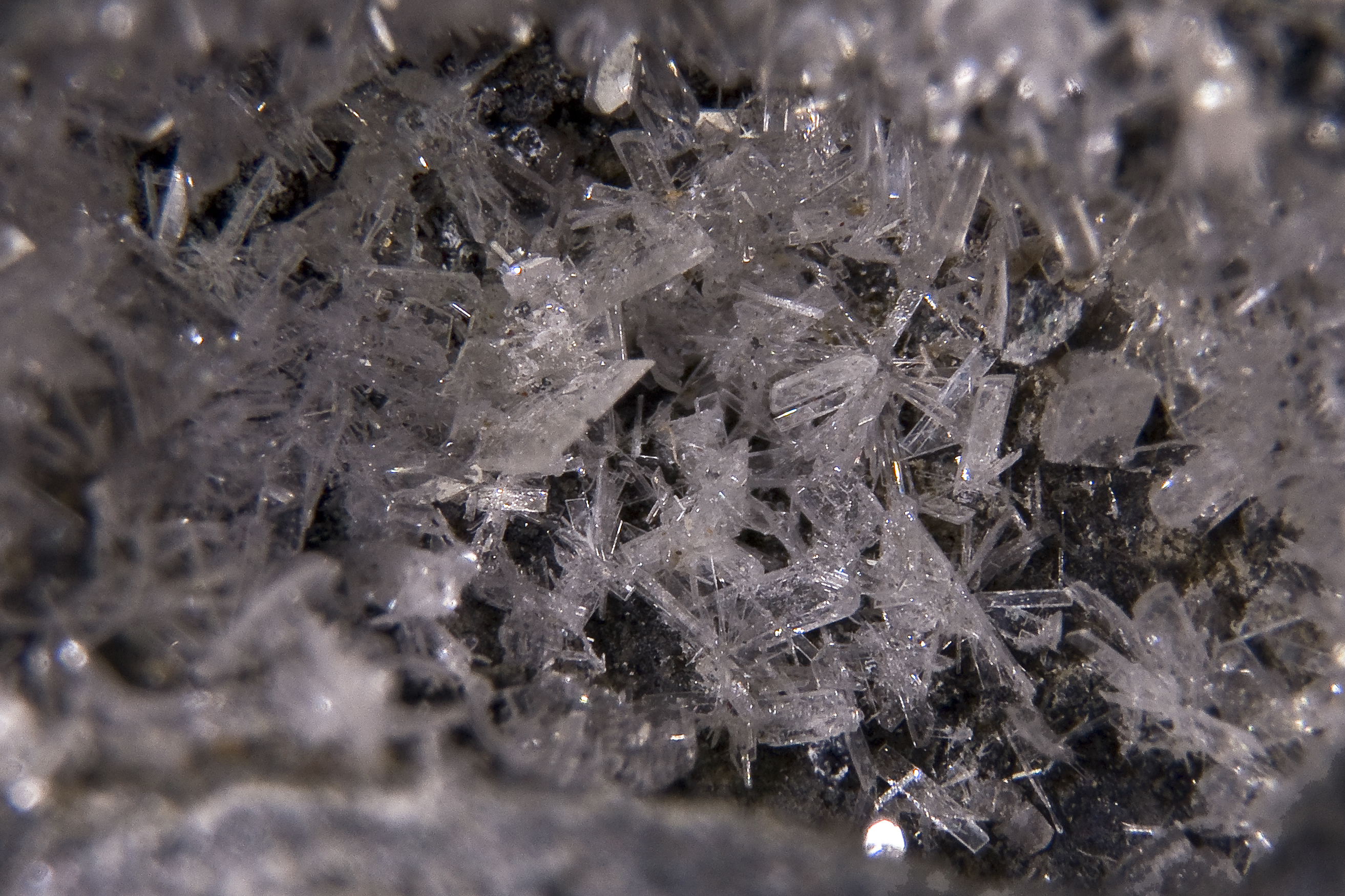
Laurionite

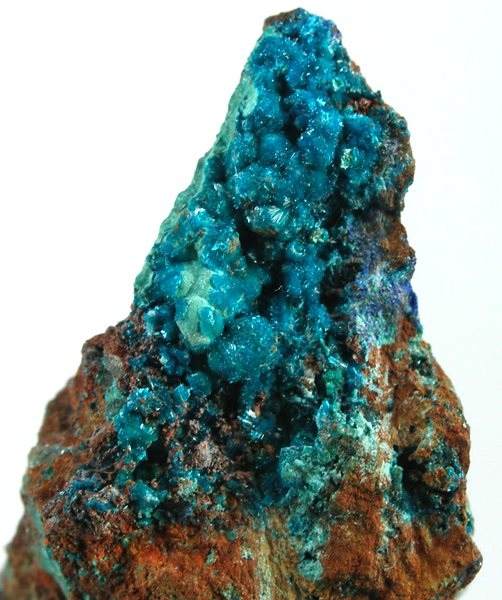
Serpierite

In the last years, under our encouragement and counsel, the Municipality of Lavrion acquired two very important collections, which have come to enrich the contents of the Museum of E.ME.L. Also, Mr. Ath. Martinos has largely contributed to this end, being acclaimed by the Board of our Society, in recognition of his commitment, great donor and honorary Member of the Society. Finally, through monetary contributions and personal purchases of mineralogical collections, citizens and friends have incessantly helped to complete the contents of the museum. At this end, the acquisition and transfer to new premises, which will allow the presentation of the collection of the museum under appropriate museological conditions, constitutes a common target, both for E.ME.L. and the Municipality of Lavrion.

The Collection

The collection of the Mineralogical Museum of Lavrion comprises samples of minerals from the region of Lavrion, pieces unique both in quality and beauty. More than 610 species of minerals have been discovered in the subsoil of the region (amounting to 16% of the world’s known minerals), which is why the region of Lavrion has been rightly named “an inexhaustible natural mineral and chemical laboratory”.

In the reduced premises of the museum, 740 mineral samples (representing 220 mineral species) are presented in showcases, classified either according to their chemical composition, e.g. sulphates, sulfides, oxides, silicates et al. (following the J. Dana system), or in cabinets comprising general samples or collections of major donors. The collection of the museum, including more than 3,200 samples, continuously grows. The polymorphy, the particular crystallization, the iridescence and the amazing colours of the minerals surprise the visitors upon arrival. Aragonites, azurites, smithsonites from Lavrion are classified among the most beautiful of the world, whilst major Museums abroad would be proud to behold among their exhibits, samples of annabergite, spangolite, takovite, ktenasite, kapellasite, glaucocerinite, a.o., such as presented here.

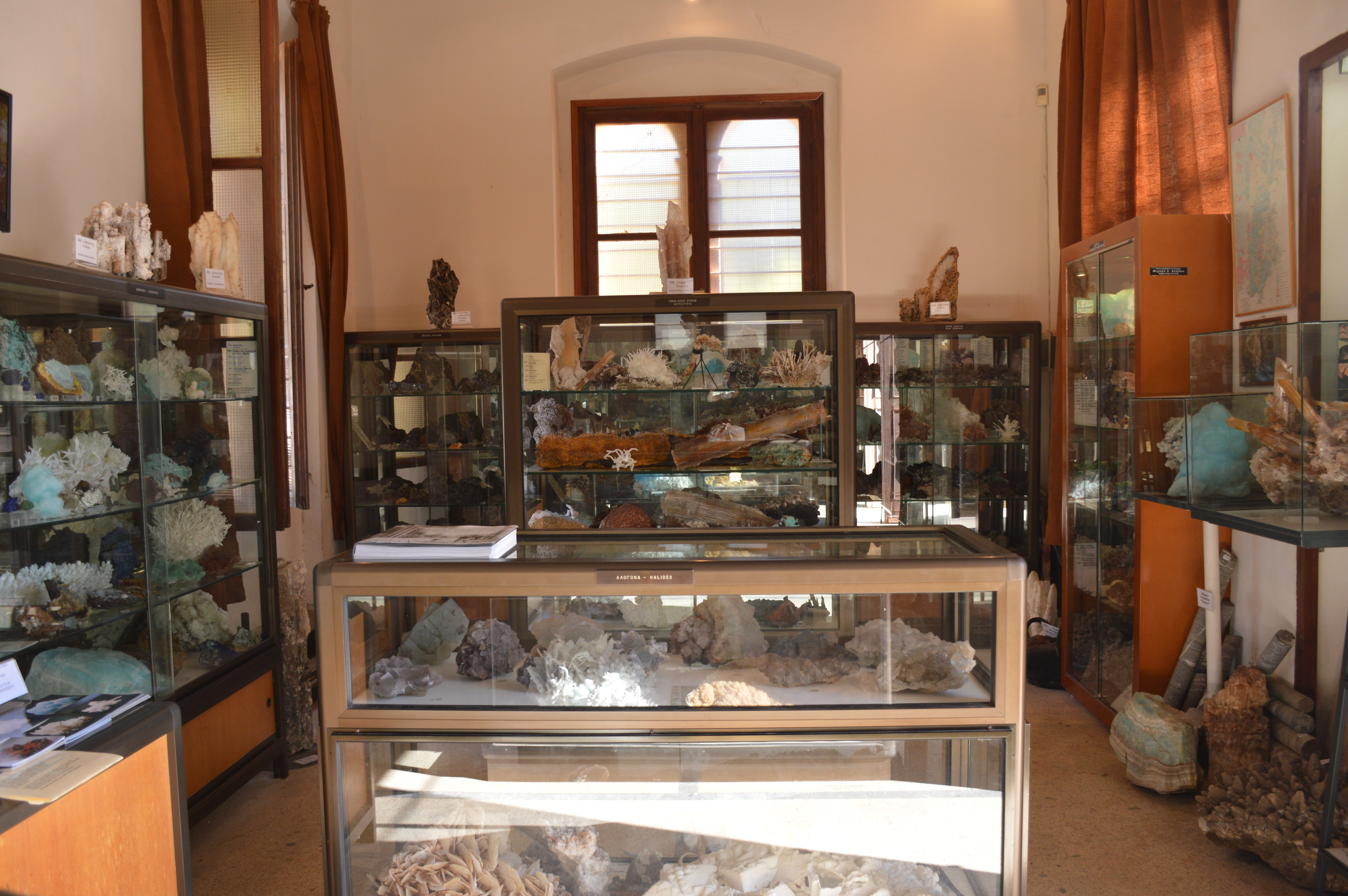
The collection of the museum

The collection of the museum also comprises ancient and modern miners’ tools, together with lead “turtles” – produced for commercialization – their moulds and other products derived from the smelting process. The visitor can also admire silver coins of ancient Athens (5th-4th c. b.C.) known as the “Lavrion owls”, according to Aristophanes. Huge rocks of slag, used as blocks in the port of the city, are on display in the surrounding grounds, together with loading barrels for vessels affected to the transportation of metals or coal, as well as a wagonette on rails recovered from a semi-destroyed mining gallery (Adami) in the nearby region of Plaka.
