= Andreas Kordellas =

Greek mineralogist and engineer (1836–1909)

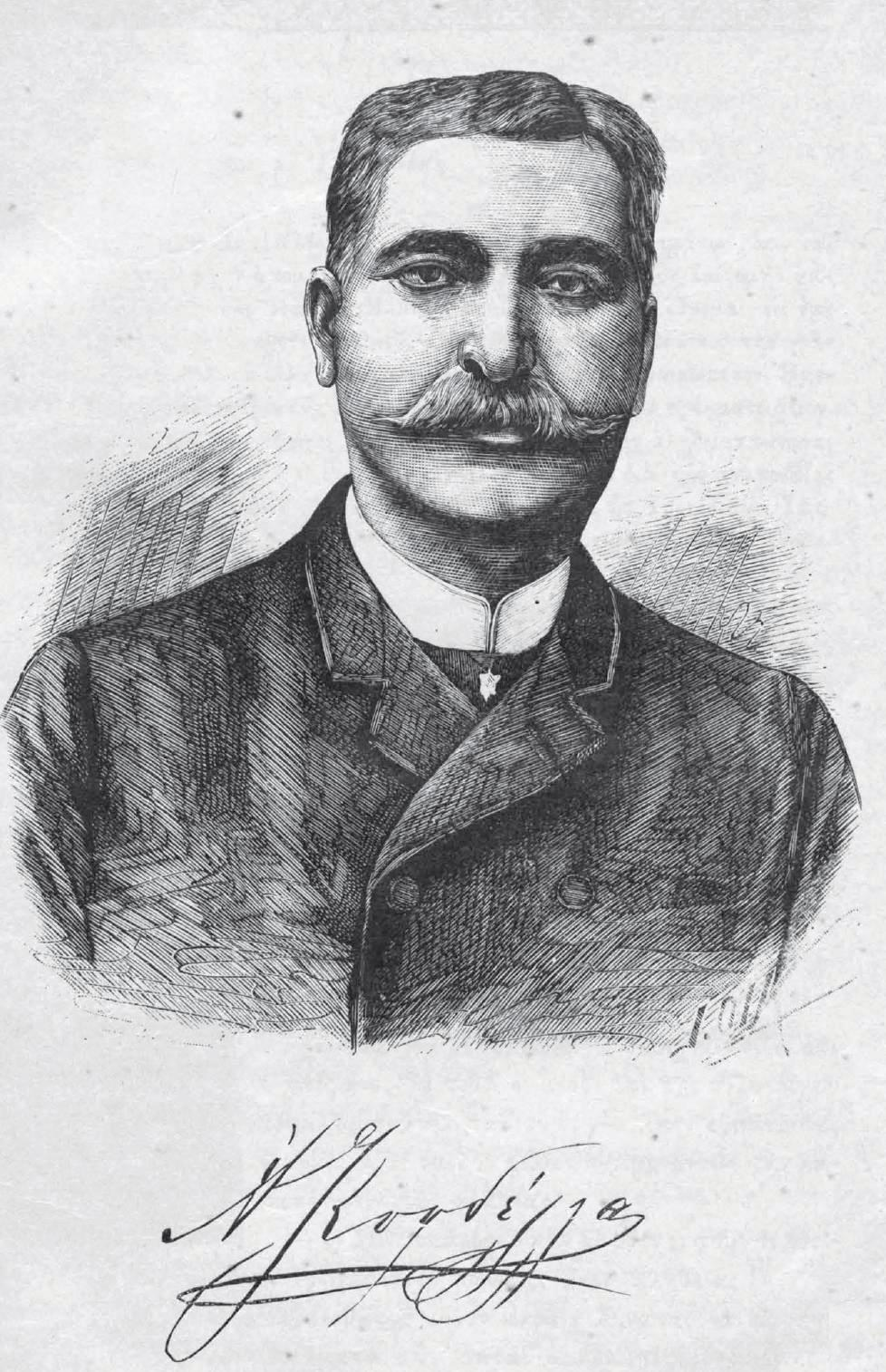
1888 depiction of Kordellas

Andreas Kordellas (30 November 1836 – 1909) was a Greek mineralogist and mining engineer.

== Biography ==
On 30 November 1836, Andreas Kordellas was born in İzmir (known in Greek as Smyrna), then under the Ottoman Empire. His father was a merchant originally from Ampelakia on the island of Salamis. In 1852, Kordellas began study at an industrial school in Zittau, Saxony; in 1855, he transferred to the Bergakademie Freiberg, but also took classes in philosophy at the University of Bonn and in mining in Liège, Belgium. He graduated in 1858.

Kordellas briefly returned to Smyrna in 1860, but left for Athens in the same year. There, he found employment at the state Ministry of Finance. He drafted mining legislation alongside Panayiotis G. Vouyoukas and Ioannis Soutsos. He was appointed the foreman of the Naxos emery mines from 1861 to 1863. He was also employed to manage water supply for the city of Athens. In 1865, he left the Ministry of Finance to become the Director of Works for a private mining company, Hilarion Roux & Cie; the company was the first modern enterprise to exploit the ancient Mines of Laurion. He had investigated the mines in December 1860 while under state employ and wrote a report on the state of the mines in the region, seeing great promise in the re-smelting of slag at the site. He simultaneously served as the director of works for another mining company, I. V. Serpieris & Co., from 1865 to 1873. In 1887 he became the director of the Greek Metal Works Company of Lavrion.

Kordellas published various papers on mineralogy and geology. He was a member of the Greek organizing committee for the 1889 Exposition Universelle in Paris, France, for which he wrote a paper advertising Greece's mineral wealth. He was a professor of mineralogy and geology at the Hellenic Military Academy from 1882 to 1894, and the inaugural president of the Hellenic Polytechnic Association from 1899. He died in Athens in 1909. During the 1990s, archaeologists named an ancient ergasterion (silver processing workshop) found at Laurion the Kordellas Ergasterion in his honor.
