= Édouard Ardaillon =

French historian and archaeologist

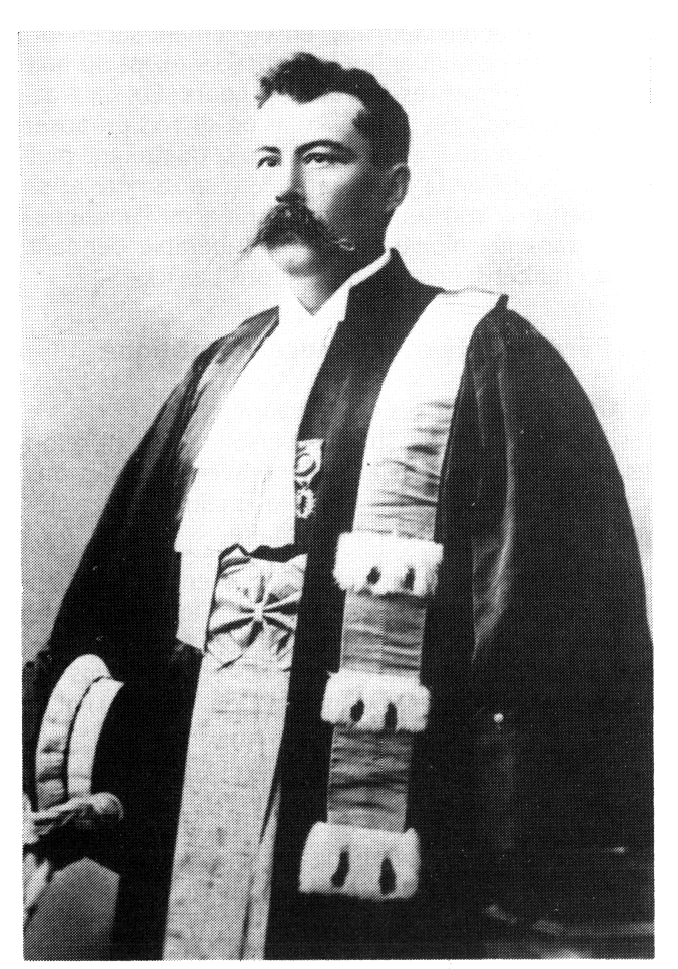
- Born: 4 May 1867; Mazères
- Died: 19 September 1926 (aged 59); Oran

Édouard Muller Ardaillon (4 May 1867 at Mazères in Ariège – 19 September 1926 at Oran in Algeria) was a French historian, archaeologist and geographer.

== Career ==
After graduating from the Boys' Catholic College of Sainte-Marie in Saint-André-de-Cubzac, he undertook a Bachelor of Arts. He was a scholar of the lycée Louis-le-Grand from 1884 to 1887. In 1887, he enrolled in the École Normale Supérieure where he achieved the Agrégation in 1890; he then joined the École française d'Athènes (graduated 1891).

In 1897, he defended his thesis on the mines of Laurion, the silver mines near Athens, whose rich deposits and intense exploitation played a key role in the development of Athenian power in the classical period; it still remains a reference work on this subject. He also carried out excavations in the port of Delos and visited the Cyclades, Ionia, Lydia and Rhodes. In June 1894 he married a young Greek girl while he was in Athens, with whom he went on to have two children.

From November 1896 he was in charge of a geography programme in the faculty of Arts at Lille, where he became chair of geography in 1899. Under his direction, the geography department of this university became important. His career received the encouragement and support of Georges Perrot, director of l'École normale supérieure; Théophile Homolle, Director of the École française d'Athènes, and Charles Bayet, rector of Lille university.

In 1905 he became rector of the University of Besançon. Finally, he was rector of the University of Algiers from 1908 until his death in 1926.

== Selected publications ==
- 1893. "Rapport sur le tremblement de terre de Zante" (Report on the Zante Earthquake), Annales de géographie 2(7) 273-280 (Online)
- 1896. "Rapports sur les fouilles du port de Delos" Bulletin de correspondance hellénique 20 (1):428-445 (Online)
- 1897. "Répartition des Chrétiens et des Musulmans dans l'île de Crète" (Division of Christians and Muslims on the Island of Crete) Annales de Géographie 6(27): 255–257.
- 1898. Les mines du Laurion dans l’Antiquité (The Mines of Laurion in Antiquity) Thesis.
- 1901. "Les principes de la géographie moderne" (The Principles of Modern Geography) Bulletin de la Société de Géographie de Lille 35, 269–90.
- 1902. Carte archéologique de l’île de Délos (Archaeological Map of the Island of Delos).
