= Asmodeus (disambiguation) =

Asmodeus is a demon in the Book of Tobit.

Asmodeus or Ashmedai may also refer to:

== Fictional characters ==
- Asmodeus, a character in the novel Le Diable boiteux
- Asmodeus (Dungeons & Dragons), a Dungeons & Dragons character
- Asmodeus (Marvel Comics), a Marvel Comics character
- Asmodeus Poisonteeth, a character in the novel Redwall
- Asmodeus, a character in the manga series Angel Sanctuary
- Asmodeus, a character in the video game Star Ocean
- Asmodeus, a character in the video game Mace: The Dark Age
- Asmodeus, a character in the webcomic Megatokyo
- Asmodeus, a character in the novel series The Magicians
- Alice Asmodeus, a character in the manga series Welcome to Demon School! Iruma-kun
- Asmodeus, a character in the television series Supernatural
- Asmodeus, a character in the web series Helluva Boss
- Asmodeus, a character in the graphic novel series DeadEndia and its television series adaptation, Dead End: Paranormal Park

== Music ==
- Asmodeus (band), an Austrian black metal band
- Asmodeus: Book of Angels Volume 7, a 2007 album by Marc Ribot

== Other uses ==
- Asmodaios (newspaper), a Greek satirical newspaper
- Asmodeus (mammal), a genus of notoungulates in the family Homalodotheriidae
- Asmodeus: Tajemný kraj Ruthaniolu, a 1997 video game

== See also ==
- Asmodeus X, an American electro-industrial band
