= Andreas Syggros =

Greek banker (1830–1899)

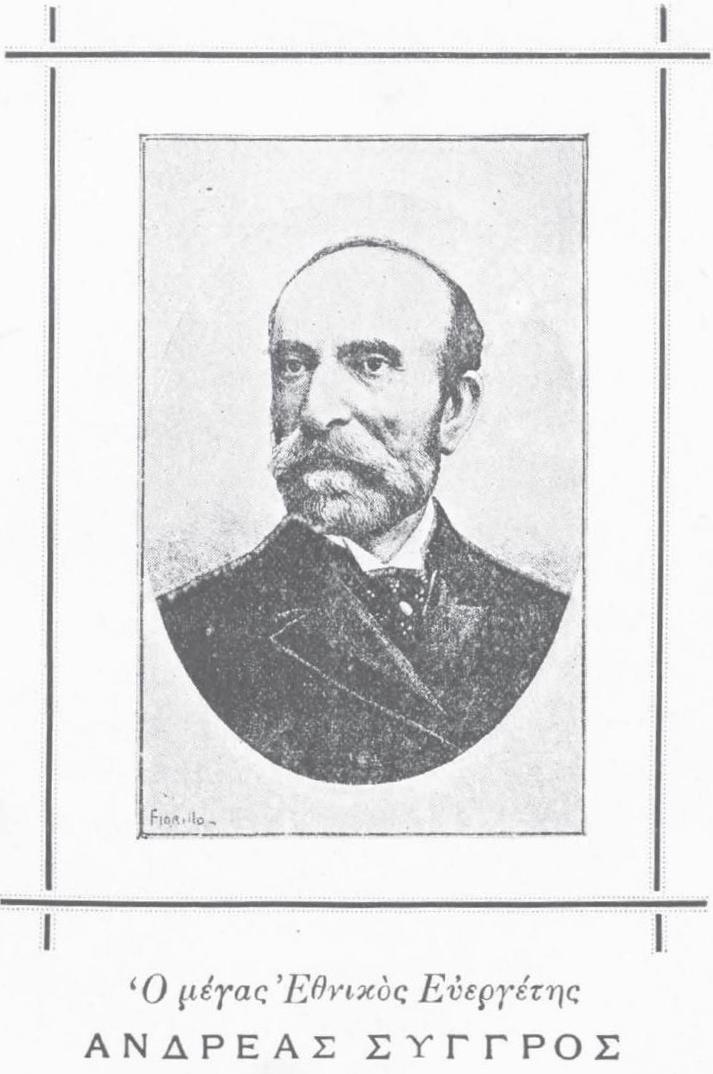
- Born: 12 October 1830; Istanbul, Ottoman Empire
- Died: 13 February 1899 (aged 68); Athens, Greece
- Occupations: banker, philanthropist

Andreas Syggros (Greek: Ανδρέας Συγγρός; 12 October 1830 – 13 February 1899) was a Greek banker from Constantinople, now known as Istanbul. and a philanthropist. Born in Istanbul to Chiot parents who left the island due to the Massacre of Chios, Syggros was one of the founders of the Bank of Constantinople along with Stephanos Skouloudis. Syggros married Iphigenia Mavrokordatou of the wealthy merchant Mavrocordatos family; they never had any children. They moved to Athens in 1871 where Syggros planned to found a new bank. Buying land from the widow of Dimitrios Rallis, Syggros engaged the well-known Athenian architect Nikolaos Soutsos who built his home based on plans by the German Ernst Ziller, across from the Royal Palace. Today the mansion is the headquarters of the Greek Foreign Ministry, having been left to the state by his widow.

He, together with other members of the Constantinople Greek diaspora and the Odessa Greek diaspora, led by Evangelis Valtatzis, founded the General Credit Bank (Ethniki Pistotiki Trapeza).

In 1873, he profited from the stock market scandal that followed the Lavreotika dispute, having previously raised the price of the Greek Company of Lavrion Mines stocks by maintaining or spreading false rumors about the existence of gold reserves in the mines.

In 1882, he founded the Privileged Bank of Epirothessaly in Volos to help the economy of the newly annexed Greek territories of Epiros and Thessaly. The annexation led to an influx of investment from expatriates who bought large estates previously belonging to Muslims who had made investments in the area. The "Privileged" in the bank's name refers to the bank receiving the right to issue banknotes in these territories. The National Bank of Greece acquired the bank after Syggros's death.

Syggros also became involved in numerous works of public philanthropy, including building an avenue from the Royal Palace to the bay at Palaio Faliro (named after him today, Andrea Syggrou Avenue) and he was responsible for completing the Corinth Canal, one of the great feats of engineering in Greece, in 1893. Syggros died in Athens in 1899, and is buried in the First Cemetery of Athens.
