= The Papess Joanne =

1866 novel written by Emmanuel Rhoides

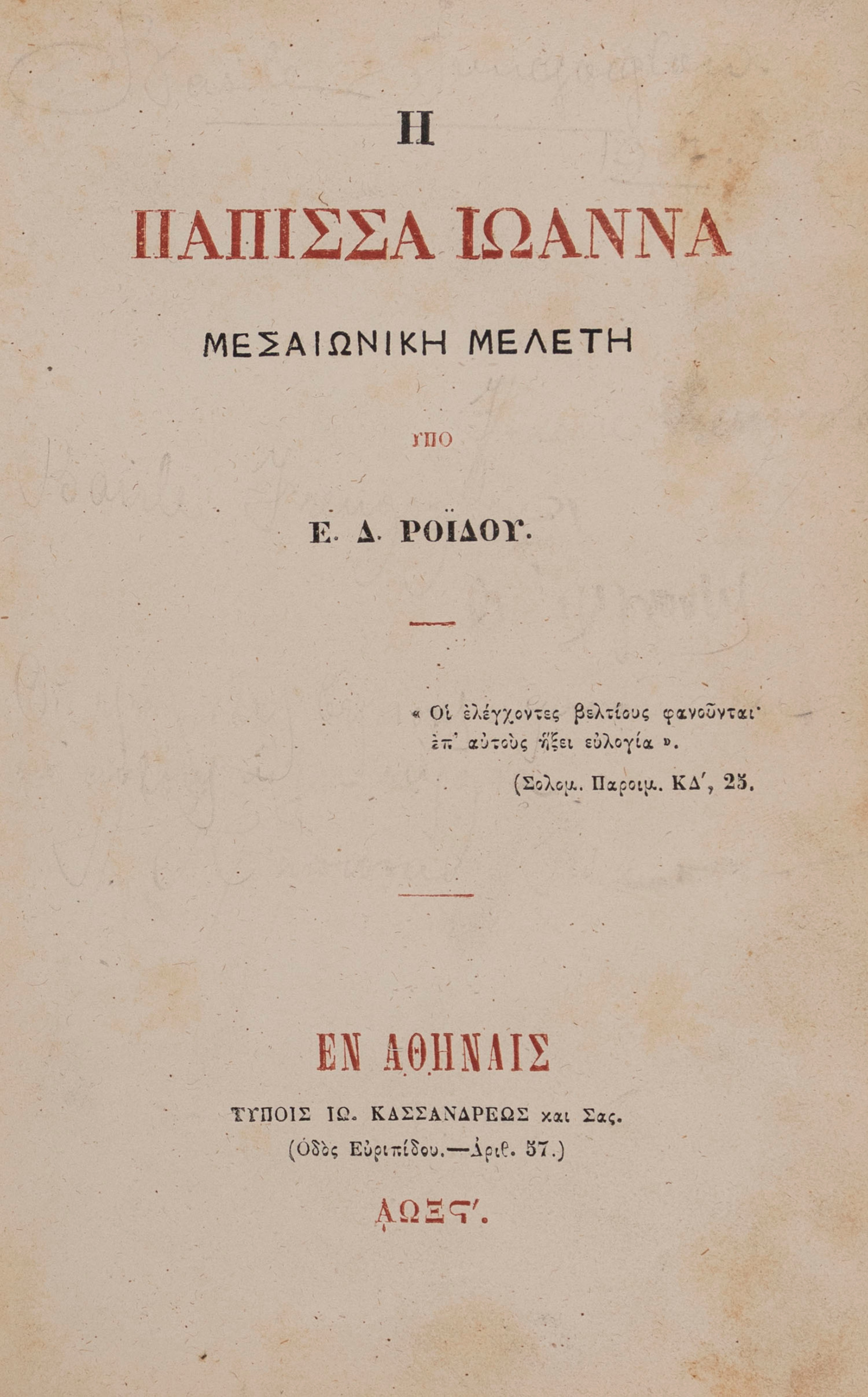
- Papissa Ioanna, front cover of the first edition, Athens 1866
- Author: Emmanuel Rhoides
- Original title: Ἡ Πάπισσα Ἰωάννα
- Language: Greek (Katharevousa)
- Genre: Romance, Satire
- Publication date: 1866
- Publication place: Greece

The Papess Joanne (Greek: Ἡ Πάπισσα Ἰωάννα, romanized: Hē Pápissa Iōánna) is an 1866 novel by Greek writer Emmanuel Rhoides. Published with the subtitle "medieval study", (Note: Greek: μεσαιωνική μελέτη) the novel is an exploration of the European legend of Pope Joan, a woman who allegedly ascended the church hierarchy and reigned as pope in disguise some time in the late 9th century. Though a romance with satirical overtones, it has been described as having elements of a chronicle because of the writer's extensive research of historical sources. Due to its religious commentary, the novel attracted criticism from the Greek Orthodox Church which resulted to its excommunication by the Holy Synod. The Papess Joanne became the most famous of Rhoides' works and has been established as a classic of Modern Greek literature; It got translated into several languages, earning Rhoides international recognition and praise.

== Overview ==
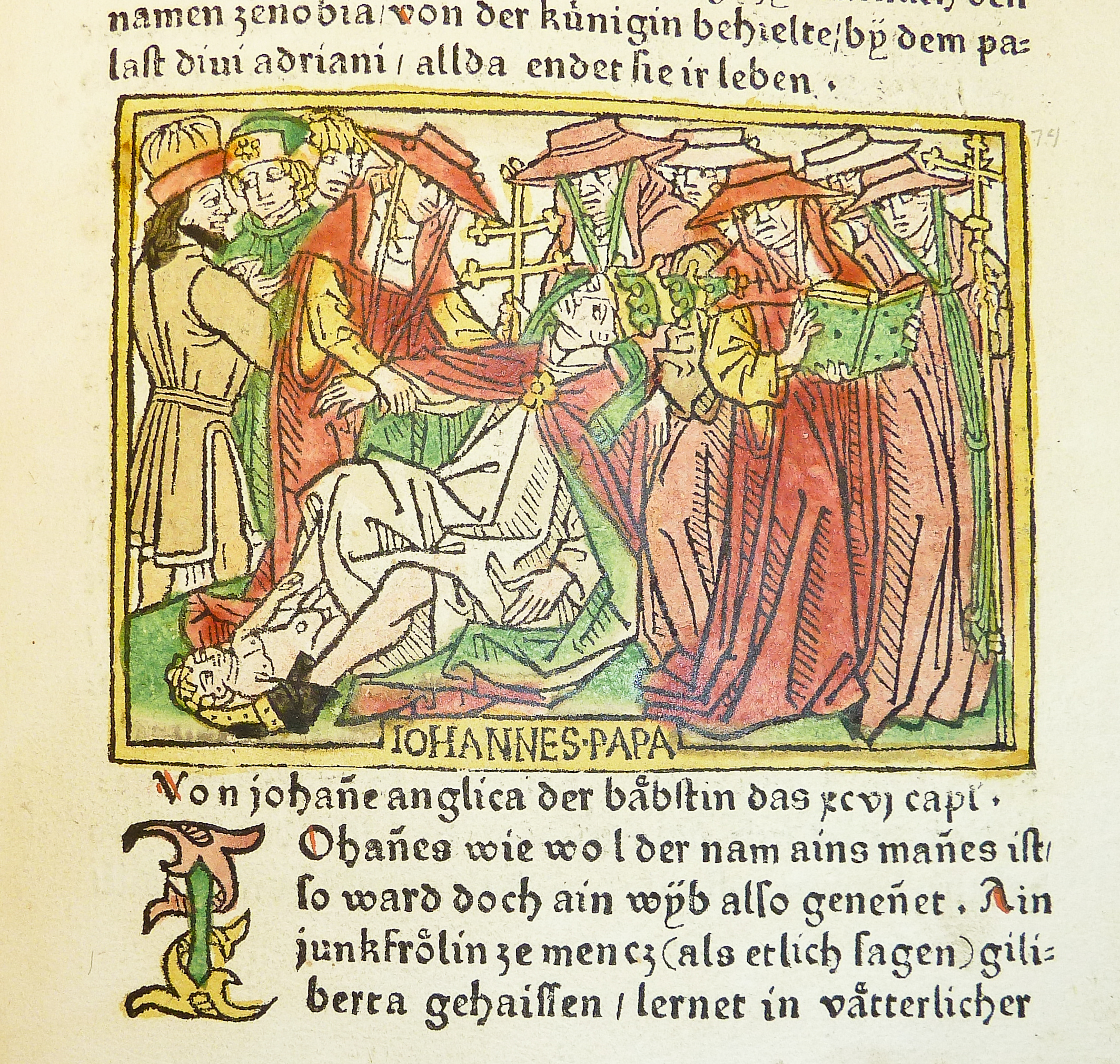
Pope Joan giving birth. Woodcut from a German translation of Giovanni Boccaccio's De mulieribus claris. (British Museum)

The premise of the work is the medieval European legend of a woman named Joan who ascended the church hierarchy and allegedly assumed the papal throne disguised as a man (sometimes identified as Pope John VIII) during the late 9th century. The story first appeared in chronicles in the 13th century and subsequently spread throughout Europe. Though previously believed by many, it is regarded as fictional in modern scholarship. Expanding upon this legend, Rhoides gives an account of the heroine's life.

Born to missionary parents, Joan grows to become an intelligent and attractive woman, deeply devoted to faith and with great knowledge of the scriptures. She elopes with a young monk named Frumentius, with whom she is involved romantically and resides (disguised as a man called "John") in a monastery in Fulda, Germany; they later go on to share many adventures travelling around Western Europe. After settling and spending many years in Athens, she separates from him in pursuit of higher things. Joan arrives in Rome where she is eventually elected as Pope. There, she soon reveals her identity to the chamberlain Florus, the son of Leo IV, with whom she maintains a secret affair. Joan's sex is finally revealed when she gives birth to their child in the middle of a litany, whereupon she dies. The event brings an end to a series of plagues that had beset upon the city.

Rhoides wrote that he first heard about the legend in Genoa as a child. Intrigued by the story, he did extensive research in Germany, Italy, and finally the National Library of Greece, and collected significant material on the period in which the storyline takes place. Ιn the preface of his book, Rhoides includes a number of references, notes, and footnotes, wanting to give a scientific appearance to his work. As emphasized by the subtitle "medieval study", the author asserted the novel contained evidence that Pope Joan truly existed and that the Catholic Church had been attempting to cover up the fact for centuries. In his long introduction, he listed a number of spokesmen in favour of the legend and declared his attempt to provide a "delineation of the state of religion, as well as of the customs and traditions of the 9th century". In reality, however, the novel constituted a caustic satire on the shortcomings of the Church, including the levels of illiteracy, abuses of power, and commercialism.

== Reception ==
The Papess Joanne is one of the few modern Greek books that gained acceptance in Europe, and the only Greek novel of the 19th century to have found a place in the European canon. It gained international audience and it was translated into several languages, including French, German, English, and Russian. Classified as one of the few comic masterpieces of modern Greek literature, it diverged significantly from the conventions of fiction at the time.

Upon its publication, the work caused debate in the Athenian press and immediate controversy in religious circles. This response undoubtedly helped to establish the novel's enduring reputation. The controversy was centered around the explicit language, erotic scenes, and Rhoides' critical commentary on the Orthodox Church. The issue was eventually introduced to the Holy Synod which characterized the novel as blasphemous. Rhoides responded to criticism by the Church initially with satirical commentaries on the press, followed –on a more serious tone– by the piece "A few words in response to the aphoristic circular of the Synod". Rhoides satirically stated that the controversy boosted the popularity of the novel, which otherwise would only be known in a small circle of scholars. After his death in 1904, there was debate on whether the Synod had excommunicated the novel or Rhoides as well. As it was stated by his nephew and biographer, Rhoides himself was in fact never excommunicated, continued to follow religious practices, and received the typical Orthodox burial.

== English translations ==
- Pope Joan: An Historical Romance, translated by John Henry Freese (H. J. Cook, 1900)
- Pope Joan: A Romantic Biography, translated and adapted by Lawrence Durrell (Derek Verschoyle, 1954; revised edition, André Deutsch, 1960)
- Pope Joan, translated by David Connolly (Aiora, 2019)

== Sources ==
- Patrides, C.A. (2014). Premises and Motifs in Renaissance Thought and Literature. Princeton University Press. ISBN 9781400856367.
- Andreades, Andreas Michael (2010). Ροϊδικά μελετήματα: 1911-1934. Morphōtiko Hidryma Ethnikēs Trapezēs. ISBN 978-9602504321.
- Beaton, Roderick (1999). Introduction to Modern Greek Literature. Clarendon Press. ISBN 0198159749.
- Mastrodimitris, P. D. (2004). "Η αισθητική της ιστορίας στην Πάπισσα Ιωάννα του Εμμανουήλ Ροΐδη". Nea Estia. pp. 591–599. Archived from the original on 2012-01-27.
- Dragoumis, Mark (2004). "Roidis' delightful irreverence". Athens News. Archived from the original on 2007-09-27.
- Rustici, Craig (2006). The Afterlife of Pope Joan, Deploying the Popess Legend in Early Modern England. University of Michigan Press. ISBN 9780472115440.
