= Lavreotika =

Legal dispute in 19-th century Greece

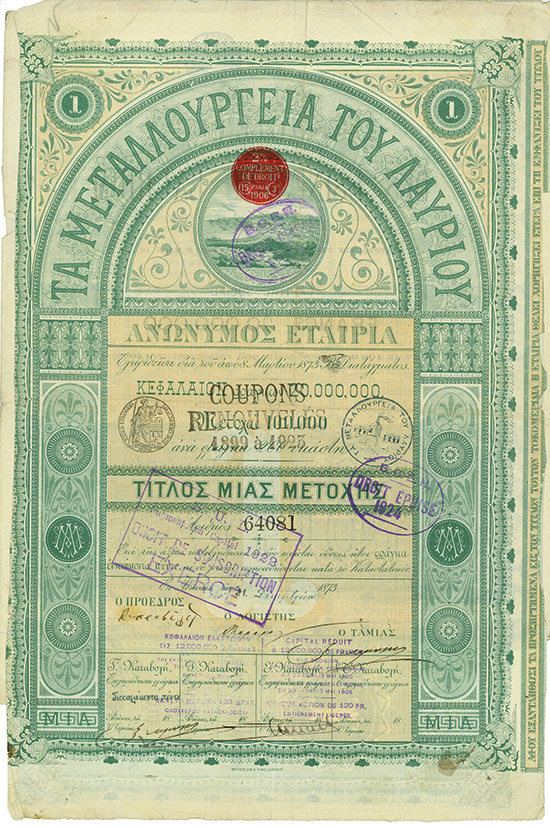
1873 share of the company Ta Μetallourgeia tou Lavriou

The Lavrion issue (Greek: Λαυρεωτικό ζήτημα, romanized: Lavreotiko zitima), most commonly known as the Lavreotika (Λαυρεωτικά, 'Lavrion Affair') was the legal dispute between the French-Italian mining company Roux - Serpieri - Fressynet CIE and the Greek state regarding the exploitation of Lavrion mines. The dispute concerned the public during the period of 1869–1875 and resulted in a stock-market scandal in which stocks were sold in a far higher price compared to their real one and at a time when Greece did not yet have a stock market.

== Background ==
The mines of Lavrion were operated during the time of the Athenian Democracy, but, after the defeat of the Athenians in the Peloponnesian War, they were shut down. Interest for the mines grew again during the 1860s when a mineralogist composed a report stating that the operation of the mines could be profitable for the state. In 1864, Giovanni Serpieri, an Italian businessman, created along with others the Roux - Serpieri - Fressynet C.E., securing a permit from the government for the operation of the mines.

== The dispute ==
A large part of the company's profit came through the gathering and processing of leftovers (at the time called ekvolades) from the ancient mining activity in the area, for which the company did not submit tax, according to the legislation of the time. The parliamentary opposition, headed by Epameinondas Deligeorgis, brought this issue to discussion stating that the company had mining rights but not rights to the leftovers already in the surface (Note: in Greek the word for mining is εξόρυξη which literally means "bring a mineral out of the Earth"). The government of Alexandros Koumoundouros, after pressure by both the opposition and the public opinion legislated strict rules and high taxation for the profit coming from the exploitation of the ekvolades. The mining company then asked the intervention of the Italian and French governments that demanded a refund of 20 million francs by the Greek government to the company. The Italian and French governments threatened Greece with military intervention causing great political instability, with 5 governments changing in 3 years.

== The scandal ==
After some negotiations, businessman Andreas Syggros reached an agreement with the French-Italian company and a new mining company was created, named Greek Company of Lavrion Mines (Ελληνική Εταιρεία Μεταλλουργείων Λαυρίου). During the negotiations and the legal dispute, a rumor that gold existed in the mines was propelled both by the government and by Syggros. After the new company was created, the owners began selling stocks despite the absence of a stock market in Greece. The prices of the stocks skyrocketed due to the rumor about gold in the mines and the consequent view of this behavior as a fast way to wealth. Many people sold their own property to buy stocks of the company. When the company did not manage to pay the stock holders their share of the profits, the stock price fell rapidly leading to huge losses for the stock buyers.
