= Asmodaios (newspaper) =

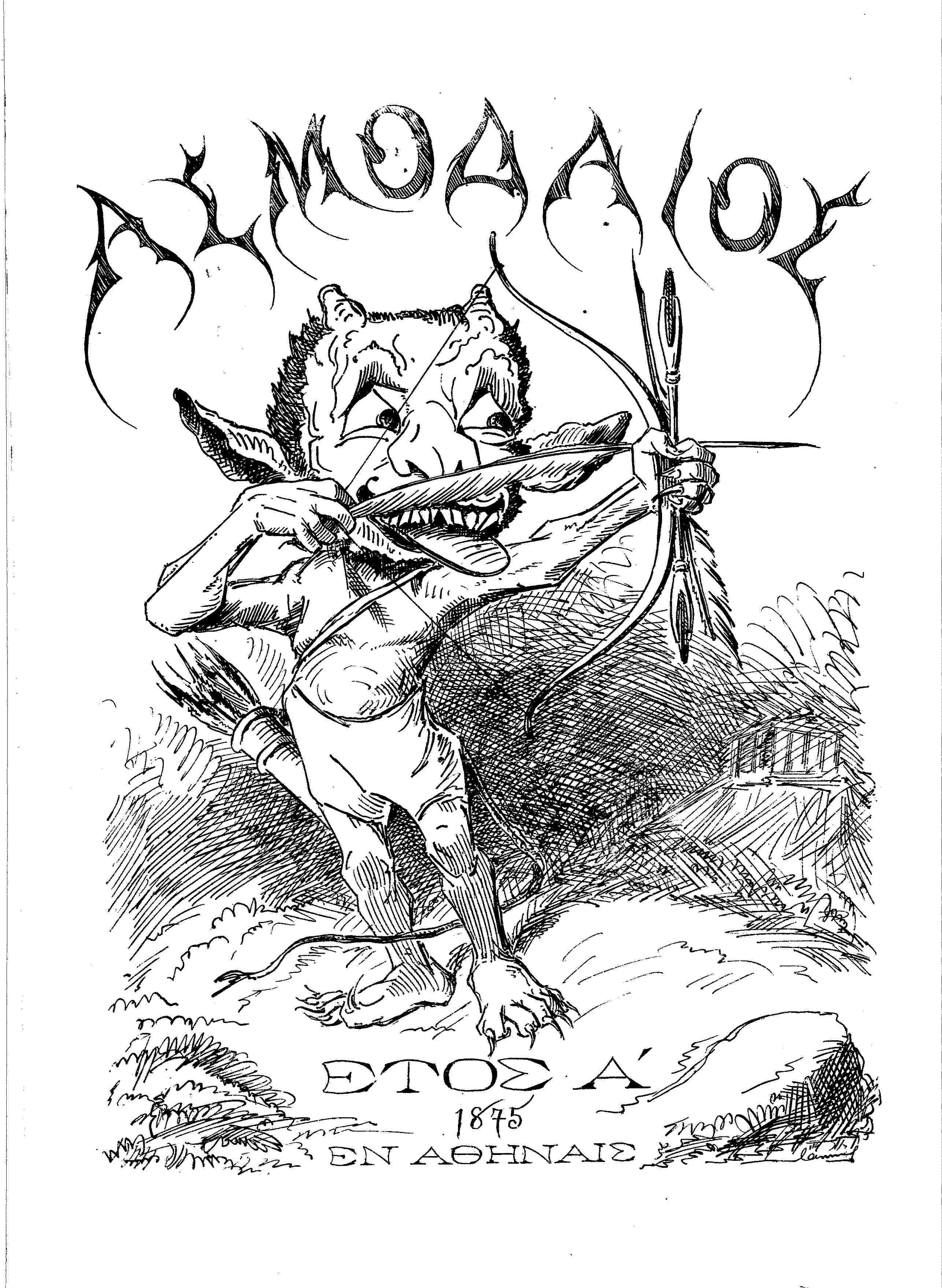
- Front page of the first issue of Roides' satirical newspaper, Asmodaios (1875)
- Type: Weekly newspaper
- Founder(s): Emmanouil Roïdis, Themos Anninos
- Founded: 17 January [O.S. 5 January] 1875
- Ceased publication: 25 August [O.S. 13 August] 1885
- Political alignment: Satirical
- Headquarters: Athens, Greece

Asmodaios (Greek: Ασμοδαίος) was a 19th-century Greek satirical newspaper published weekly in Athens.

== History ==
Asmodaios was founded in 1875 by the satirical writer Emmanouil Roïdis and the journalist and cartoonist Themos Anninos. This newspaper was published for a decade, from 1875 to 1885, with only a short break in July 1876.

The masthead featured a cartoon of the demon Asmodeus, playfully drawn as an archer and a combination of Cupid and Satyr.

== Content ==
The paper was known for satire of a gentle, humorous sort without personal rancour, and Anninos' cartoons were widely recognised for their artistic quality. Contributors included Georgios Souris and Anninos' brother Babis Anninos.
