= Mines of Laurion =

Mine in Greece

The mines of Laurion (or Lavrion) are ancient mines located in southern Attica between Thorikos and Cape Sounion, approximately 50 kilometers south of the center of Athens, in Greece. The mines are best known for producing silver, but they were also a source of copper and lead. A number of remnants of these mines (shafts, galleries, surface workshops) are still present in the region.

The mines were exploited in prehistoric times as a source of copper and galena, a lead ore. In the classical period, mining in the area resumed. The Athenians used large numbers of slaves to mine the area, with the silver produced contributing significantly to the city's wealth. Abandoned in the 1st century BC, the mines were reactivated in 1864 and mined for their lead by French and Greek companies until 1978.

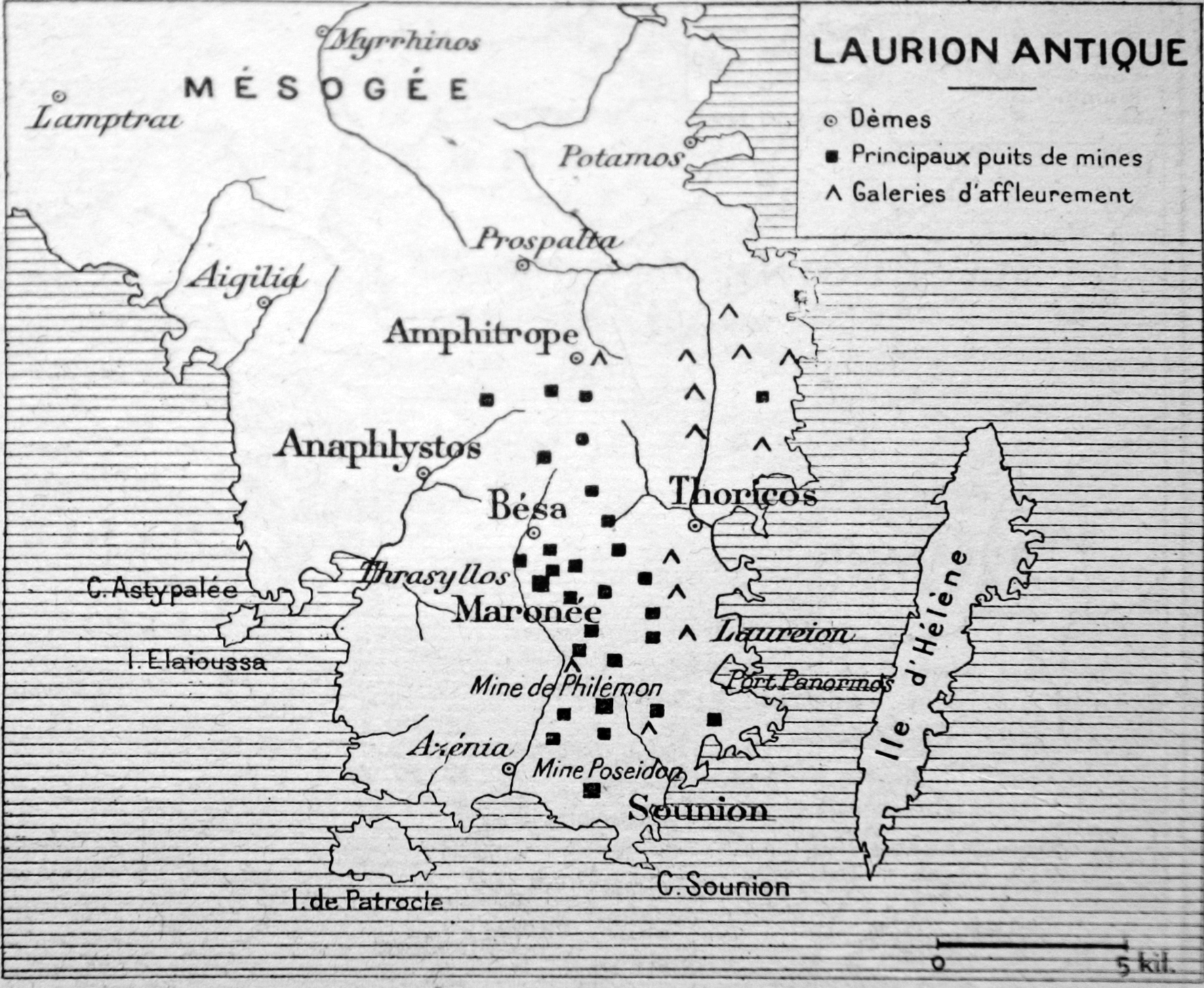
Map of Southern Attica, showing the locations of the mines at Laurion

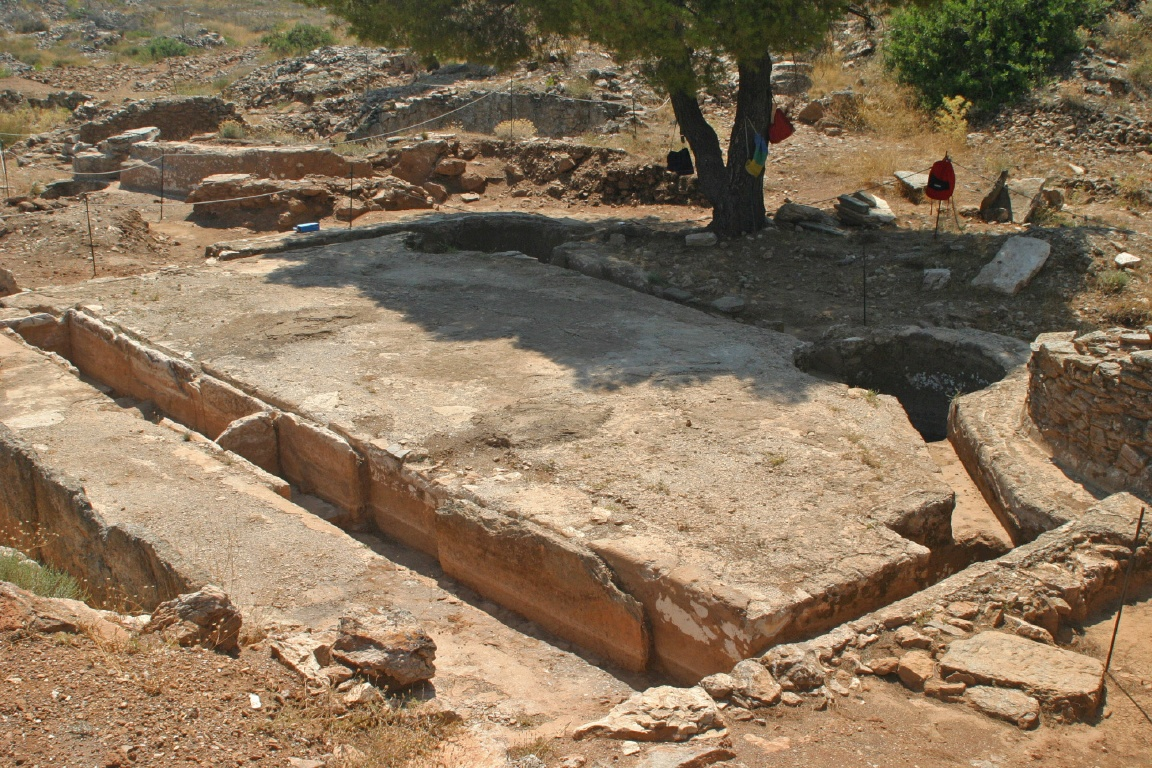
Washing table at the mines of Laurion

== History ==
=== Ancient times ===
The mines are older than recorded history. Even at the time of Classical Greece, they were older than historians could determine:

It is clear, I presume, to every one that these mines have for a very long time been in active operation; at any rate no one will venture to fix the date at which they first began to be worked.

— Xenophon, Ways and Means (354 BC)

Modern archaeology has demonstrated that the mines were exploited since at least the Bronze Age: isotopic analyses of various objects produced in Greece's Mycenaean period indicates that they contain lead extracted from the Laurion mines.

The earliest evidence for mining activity at Laurion comes from the Late Neolithic period, around 3200 BC. Mining became more systematic starting from the late 6th century BC, and in the 5th century it was an important source of revenue for Athens. During this period, the city began to mine a new and particularly rich vein, which unlike the two which had previously been exploited did not appear on the surface. During the tyranny of Peisistratos systematic exploitation of the mineral resources of Athens began. Shafts were driven down into the ground and galleries opened where slaves, chained, naked, and branded, worked the seams illuminated only by guttering oil lamps. An unrecorded number were children. It was a miserable, dangerous, and brief life.

This discovery meant that at the beginning of the second Persian invasion of Greece (480–479 BC), the Athenian state had at its disposal a hundred talents of silver (about 2.6 tonnes) from the aforementioned vein. Rather than distribute this wealth amongst the citizens of Athens, Themistocles proposed that this money should be used to construct 200 triremes, which were used to conduct the naval campaign against Persia which culminated in victory at the Battle of Salamis in 480 BC. Although lead, mercury, cinnabar, red chalk, and ochre were considered to be byproducts of silver production, they were still useful. After the Persians fled Athens around 479 BCE, the city needed to be rebuilt. Over the next century lead from the mines would be brought to make countless different water pipes and clamps that would aid in the rebuilding of Athens.

Loss of free men and slaves as a result of the Peloponnesian War (431–404 BC) caused the mines to shut down. This compounded the economic crisis of Athens, along with the infrastructure damage to the port of Piraeus. They were reopened later, but the later wars, exhaustion of the ores and the influx of precious metal during the Hellenistic era reduced their importance. In the early Roman era, the mining efforts were still significant, with the Deipnosophistae (early 3rd-century AD), referring to Posidonius, making mention of large slave revolts there around the times of the Second Servile War (104–100 BC). Sulla's campaign against Athens in the First Mithridatic War (89–85 BC), put an end to the mining although there appear to have been limited attempts to reactivate them a few centuries later.

=== Modern times ===
In 1860, mining engineer Andreas Kordellas investigated Laurion, and wrote of the potential for processing slag in the region. Mining at Laurion resumed in 1864. Renewed mining involved both the processing of ancient slag for remaining lead and silver and the extraction of fresh ore. Mining of zinc ore was a commercially significant in the Laurion area in modern times. It was mined from reactivation in 1864 until 1930. Iron ore was also mined through the 1950s. The mines continued to be active, producing silver and other metals until profitable sulfide deposits were exhausted in 1978.

During the early years of their modern operation, the mines became the cause for a legal dispute, known as Lavreotika (1869–1875), between the Greek state and the mining company, that resulted in foreign powers threatening military intervention. After the dispute was resolved, an economic scandal broke out, as a result of the cultivation of rumors regarding the existence of gold reserves in the mines.

The mines were a theater of social and labor conflicts with numerous strikes taking place in late 19th century. The 1896 Laurion miners strike was violently confronted by the mining company's guards resulting in the death of two workers. The miners responded by blowing up the company's offices and killing the guards. In response the government sent police forces against the strikers. Further clashes occurred, to which the government responded by sending the military whose intervention resulted in more workers' deaths. This was the end of the strikes with most of the strikers' demands not being met and with a military force being permanently established to patrol the miners.

== Geology ==
The mines of Laurion are situated in the Attic-Cycladic metamorphic complex. Structurally, the Laurion area bedrock consists of a recumbent fold in the Kamariza marble with the Kamariza schist forming a hinge. Atop the folded marbles lie a layer of limestone deposited during a marine transgressive episode in the Jurassic and lower Cretaceous. This limestone layer is topped by Jurassic blueschists and overthrust, metamorphosed ophiolite.

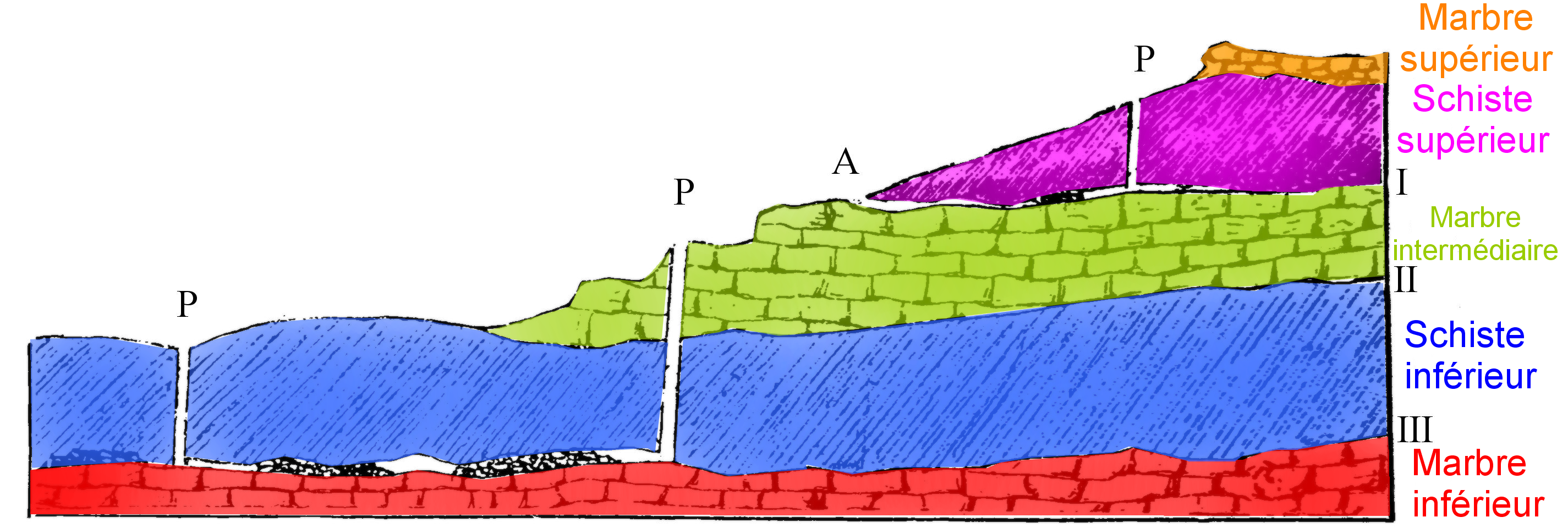
Diagram showing Laurion area strata with contacts I, II, and III labeled

Miners in the 19th century organized the major deposits in this sequence into three separate contacts. The first contact is located within the transgressive limestones and consists of lead, zinc and silver sulfide minerals. The second contact occurs between the upper Kamariza marble and the Kamariza schist. This deposit consists of cerussite (lead carbonate) and smithsonite (zinc carbonate) ores. The third contact occurs between the lower Kamariza marble and Kamariza schist. This deposit contains cerussite and iron oxides.

== Mining sites of ancient Greece and their processes ==
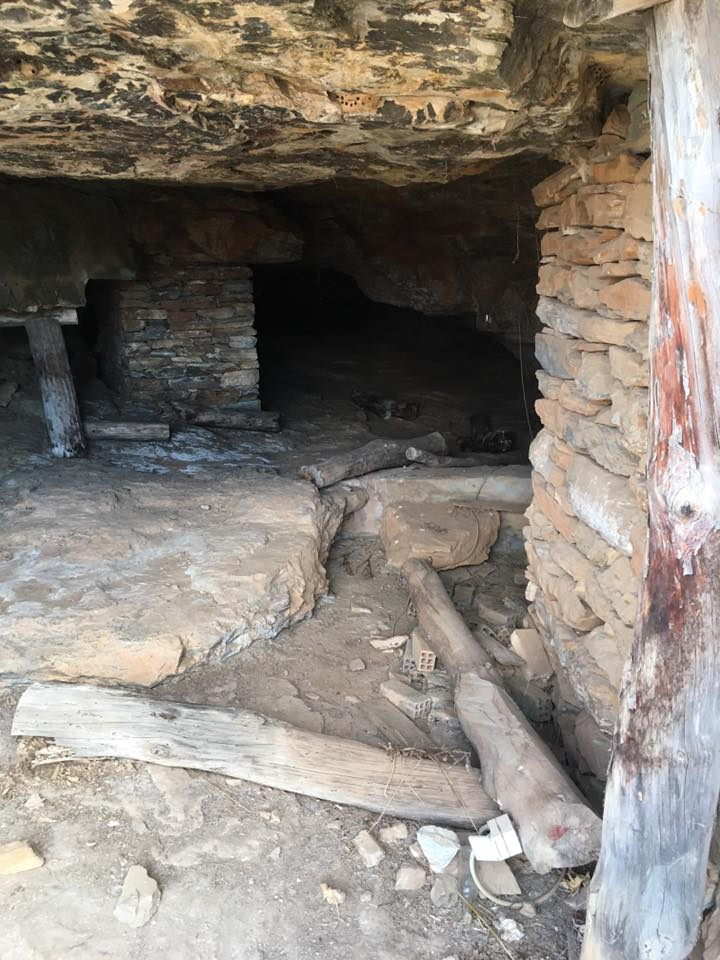
A mining shaft located in Thorikos which is home to several mining spots in the greater Laurion mining region

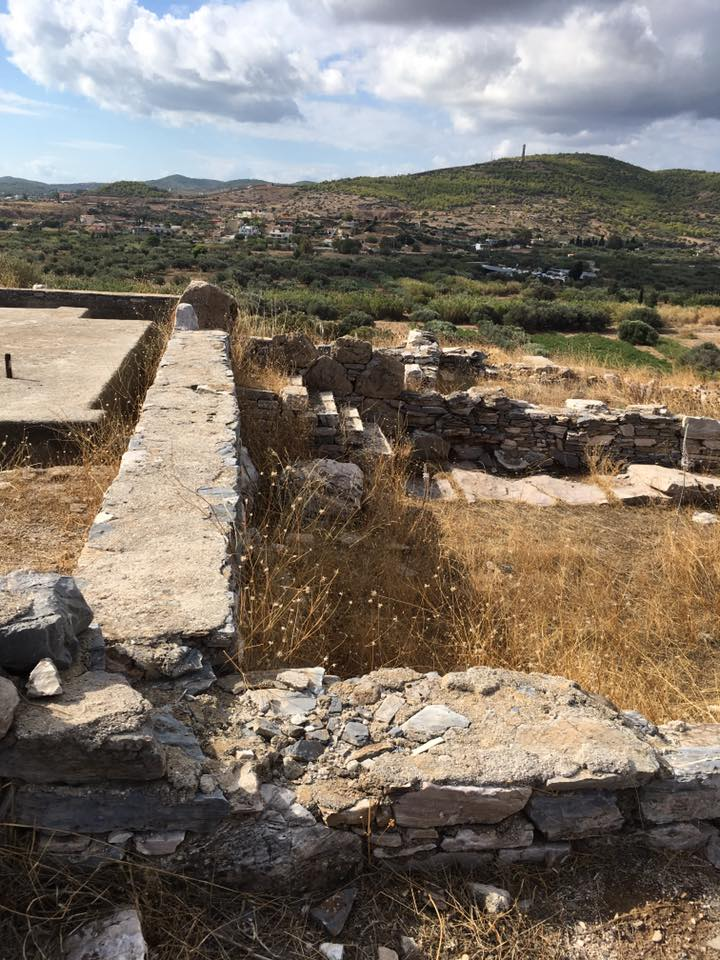
A rectangular washery at a washing site of the mines of Laurion located in Thorikos

For almost 300 years the mines of Laurion provided ancient Athens and their allies with several thousand tons of high purity silver. However, this much silver did not come from one particular mining spot. Around 700 ancient mine shafts have been discovered along with about 200 ore processing stations. At these sites, the silver ore was first extracted from the mine shafts and brought to the surface with containers by workers who were most likely slaves. It has been estimated that almost 20,000 slaves worked the mines and fulfilled various tasks from extracting the ore to washing it in the washing stations. Throughout the mining region of Laurion, there were a few different versions of washing stations where the silver ore was processed. All of these workshops had three basic elements. Each possessed a large cistern to store large amounts of water that were situated next to the ore washery and nearby were the living quarters of those who worked the site. The water from this cistern was typically fed into a few different nozzles that lead to the sluices, which were wooden troughs meant to filter out large ore pieces that might still need to be ground into smaller sizes. When the ore slurry was acceptable it flowed through a series of stone or cement channels that flowed in a rectangular shape. However, not all washeries were rectangular in shape. According to research conducted by Professor C. E. Conophagos, a professor of metallurgy at the Polytechnic or National Technical University of Athens, other mining sites that used circular or helicoidal ore washeries were more efficient but also more rare. Only a few round washeries have been discovered at the Bertseco and Demoliaki sites. As the slurry flowed through these washery channels there were various settling "tanks" where the heavier more "pure" silver ore would fall to the bottom. The impure particles kept flowing and would be later disposed of. Afterward, the pure particulate would be collected and transported to the smelting sites where ancient industrial furnaces smelted the silver ore using various metallurgic cupellation methods. The "pure" silver ore actually contains an excessive amount of lead that still needs to be removed. This ore is heated to very high temperatures in order to separate the lead from the silver which each display different physical properties when subjected to intense heat. Once the various smelting processes are complete the silver is ready to be fashioned into various objects such as coins.

There are two very prominent mining sites of Laurion that archeologists have been able to analyze and understand. The first is Thorikos, which is located in the northern part of the Laurion mining region near Francolimani Bay. The second site is Soureza, which is situated in the southern portion of the Laurion mining site near Mt Michaeli. A study conducted by Ghent University performed hydrological analysis throughout the Laurion mining region in order to reconsider the role of Thorikos in the mines of Laurion. Since water is essential in processing the silver ore a continuous water supply was a necessary component to how these washing workshops functioned. Researchers used hydrological modeling to simulate the water supply that the ancient washeries were operating on. The study found that the Soureza workshops sourced their water supply from ephemeral streams where the streams were tapped and used to feed large cisterns. At Thorikos the cisterns were fed by the collecting of runoff from the scarce rainfall which failed to provide a sufficient amount of long lasting water. As a result of this poor water supply the study had to conclude that Thorikos was a widely less productive site when compared to the Soureza washeries.

== Ancient economic influence through coins ==
The mines of Laurion were an important source of metal during Ancient Greece and helped to fabricate many of the coins that were exchanged as money throughout the region. Within the mines, located on the southeast portion of Attica, there are large silver deposits that also contain an abundance of copper and lead. Although the mines contained some of the highest silver deposits in Attica, the percentage of silver in the extracted ore is only 0.1%. The metal ore of the mines contain a specific isotopic ratio of lead within the silver, that is later turned into coins by the Greeks. Lead isotopic analysis can differentiate the origins of a particular metal structure from that of another. Although this does not mean that the origin of these coins can be definitively determined, it does mean that a set of two particular coins do or do not possess a common origin.

Other mines in the Mediterranean, such as those on the islands of Siphnos and Thasos mentioned by Herodotus, have similar lead ratios but differ enough for archaeologists and physicists to pinpoint where the silver originates. This has been demonstrated by the Analytical Chemistry Division at the Institute for Materials Research National Bureau of Standards, located in Washington, D. C., where a group of archaeological chemists have used precise mass spectroscopy to determine the lead isotopic ratio of the silver ore located in the Laurion mines. This same analytical process was applied to the samples of smelted silver in the form of Ancient Greek coins from the classical period of Greece in Ancient Athens and surrounding cities. This showed that the Athenians minted their silver coins almost exclusively at the Laurion mines whereas the surrounding cities obtained their silver ore from where ever they could. These Athenian coins were highly sought after because of their origin in the Laurion Mines. The level of mineral purity within the extracted ore was incredibly rare throughout the ancient Greek world and Athens had exclusive access to it. Athens would then use their access to the Laurion mines to direct a majority of the silver to be made into coins that would be used to pay for the famous Athenian navy. This silver paid for the navy that would later award Athens victory over the Persians and would later given them influence over most of Greece. However, the mine's influence over Greece began to fade as its silver deposits ran dry sometime between 400 and 300 BCE.

== When the mines ran dry ==
After the Peloponnesian War at around 400 BCE, Athens was in decline and the mines of Laurion had been spent on almost all their silver. Since the flow of silver from the mines waned, the Athenians began to re-mint their coins en masse in order to keep the economic growth they were receiving alive. There are a few notable accounts of the economic impact of this practice. The Athenian leader Hippias had tried this practice a century before by imposing very specific coinage policies that Oeconomica wrote about:

he also made the coinage existing among the Athenians legally invalid (adokimon), and, having fixed a price, ordered them to bring it to him; and after they had come together for the purpose of striking another type (character), he gave back the same silver money (argurion).

Hippias's goals were not clear but Oeconomica highlights that his actions had disturbing economic effects. The Athenian leader was able to make a decent profit from the devaluation of all the coins in the city. He required that the current devalued coins be exchanged for "legal coins" that were given a higher value.

After the Peloponnesian War had ended and the mines had run dry, this devaluation and re-minting of Athenian coins was brought to an extreme all over Attica. Dionysius I of Syracuse ruled from 405 to 367 BCE ordered that all the coinage be collected and re-minted at double its original value. If citizens refused to do so they were threatened with death sentences. Another ruler known as Leukon I of the Cimmerian Bosphoros who ruled from 389 to 348 BCE imposed almost the same thing but did not threaten the punishment of death. Instead, he decreed that all coins that remain the same will be essentially worthless. As leaders across Attica devalued their silver, the Laurion mines became active again around 370 BCE, when some businessmen decided to rent out some of these recently abandoned mines. They were more successful than expected resulting in a small economic boom in the greater Laurion region in 340 BCE. However, the mines were outcompeted by the rising gold and silver industries in Macedonia and Thrace. Silver prices plummeted when Alexander the Great finally obtained the Persian silver industry. However, the Romans defeated the Macedonians in 168 BCE and later ordered the shut down of all of their mines to prevent Macedonia from rising again. This opened up an economic opportunity for Athens to seize. The Romans provided cheap slave labor and new technologies gave the Greeks new means of extracting silver in more efficient ways. The Laurion mines were revived for a short while but they would never become the silver river they had once been.

== See also ==
- Mineralogical Museum of Lavrion
