= Leontios Petmezas =

Greek contemporary theorist and art historian

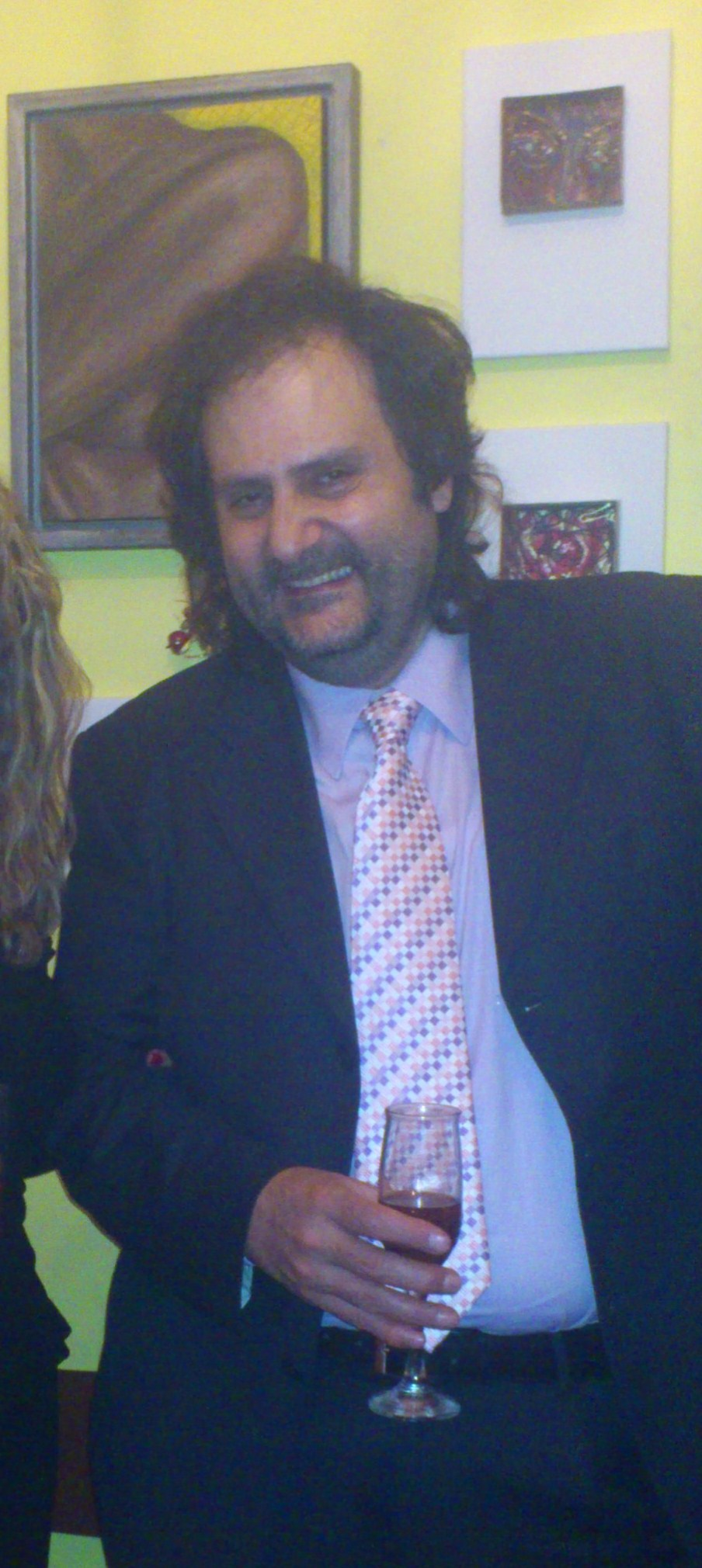
Leontios Petmezas, 2012

Leontios Petmezas (born 1965) is a Greek contemporary theorist, art historian, book critic, author and journalist.

== Early life and education ==
Born in Kavala in 1965. He is a graduate of Political Science and School of Public Administration at Athens University. His teachers included Thanos Veremis, Alexis Mitropoulos, Ioannis Valinakis, Konstantinos Tsoukalas, and Tassos Giannitsis. He graduated from the National Conservatory and the Higher Drama School "Mary Tragas". He studied History of Art at Athens University, journalism at Botsis Foundation and the Journalism School of ANT1. He attended art history and painting in Europe and the United States.

== Career ==
Since the mid-1980s to today collaborates with municipalities, ministries, embassies, prefectures, political offices, spiritual and educational institutions, publishing complexes, educational cultural centers and art galleries. From 2004 to 2012 he was Artistic Director and Principal advisor artistic institution "Art Flame.". In the context of cooperation with the artistic institution taught painting and art history. It contributes to the organization and presentation of exhibitions, festivals and events of art and culture, around the world. deals with the assessment of works of art. Contributed actively to the establishment of new perspectives, negotiations and arrangements in the field of art. He teaches History of contemporary art and exhibits artworks in Greece, and abroad and has received positive reviews from recognized historians of art-critics like Helen Vakalo, Alexander Xidis, Nikos Hadjikyriakos-Ghikas and others. Paintings belong to famous art collections (Argostoli Gallery of Contemporary Art, Art Studio Est, Art Way, Art Space, Art Selected Works, etc.) while a substantial proportion allocated to charity. Introduced editions, visual arts, literary and poetry books, exhibition catalogs, exhibitions, events, happenings, performances and other cultural events. In 2012 presented a study-thesis for the poet Nikiforos Vrettakos in the Philological Association of Parnassos. For his pen and writing have been expressed with favorable criticism prominent people of the area as Elli Alexiou, Lilika Nakos, Lili Zografou, Dido Sotiriou, Maria Iordanidis and others. He is often a speaker at international conferences and symposium of the art.

To 2014 took part as moderator and rapporteur at first colloquium of Political Party of Syriza To 2015 he was appointed scientific adviser to the Greek Academy of Art and Culture.

== Books ==
- "Dominant thought form" (1988), poetry in free verse.
- "Odes people" (1992), poetry with abstract writing.
- "Collage" (1994), poetry with prose intervention.
- "Life dimension" (1996) unconventional, anti-militarist, antirissiaki poetry.
- "The aesthetic contemplation of Costas Evangelatos" (2001) Essay artistic ethos with a foreword by the winning with state award literary Joanna Karatzaferis.
- "Moments of color" (2002) Theoretical approach to Fauvism, with reference to the tables of Julia Guerrero.
- "Pictorial solution borderline" (2003) Theoretical approach to impressionism.
- "Consciousness sayings" (2008), Poems.,
- "John Koutsoheras-The moralistic intellectual political consciousness" (2010) Essay-theoretical approach to poetry, with a foreword by the philologist Sophia Petmeza..,
- "Consciousness file" (2011). Poetry with visual compositions for the texts created by Costas Evangelatos, with an introduction by actress Anna Fonsou.
- "Costas Evangelatos Art- Est (2014)», with his theoretical text for 35 years performance of Costas Evangelatos

== Theatrical plays (writer) ==
- The other side is always nothing (1982) (satire statements)
- Was false love (1985) (satire)
- The upper room (1988) (social)
- Where is the paper? (1989) (satire statements)
- Smell of sweet (1993) (social)
- Case candle counter (1994), (satire social mores)
- Strange woman (1996) (satire)
- Passion path (1998), (time from the resistance)
- Consciousness thinking (1999) (thriller)
- Inside the gold box (2000), (existential drama)
- Waiting and the second (2001) (social drama)
- No mutual attraction (2003) (melodrama)
- The first bright day (2004) (existential drama)
- Open this door (2006), (theater absurd)
- If he comes again (2007), (interfaith reference)
- Ballad in myth of Perliplin (2010) (operetta) inspired by Federico García Lorca
- Waiting for ...Pinter (2011) (subversive, political theater).
- I have to wait you ...for all the life (2014), satire-ethnography social situations.

== Theatrical plays (actor) ==
- The summer will reap of Alexis Damianos in municipal regional theater of Kavala (1986).
- Winter's tale of William Shakespeare (Leondios old man) (1988)
- The Butterfly's Evil Spell of Federico García Lorca, translated by Elli Alexiou (1990)
- Instead-Performance of Costas Evangelatos (1995)
- Play Strimberg of Friedrich Dürrenmatt (general) (1997)
- Old People's Home of Manolis Korres (general) (1999)
- Pirliplin and Belissa of Federico García Lorca, translated, adapted from Triantafyllidis Niki and directed by Zoe Masouras who plays the Belissa. (2011)
- The myth of Morpheus, the first interactive theater Happening City of Athens Gazi. (2011)
- The Geraldine and the elf of Lake of Eva Petropoulos-Lianos, kids, interactive, educational theater project, (grandfather Lionel) (2012).
- On the border of Anarchy, political, social work (Police Officer) (2013)

== Participation in the movie ==
- Four for four of Alexis Katsaros (1997).

== Artistic tributes presented ==
- International art festival of Aegean Sea (2007)
- Homage to Maria Callas (2009)
- Tribute to Woman (2010),
- Tribute to Melina Mercouri (2011)
- Tribute to Frida Kahlo.
- Tribute to Theo Angelopoulos (2012)
- Overview of football Olympic team (2013)

== Prefaces written ==
- There of author Irini Falagkas (1998).
- In expressionism of love, the anatomy of the apparition (2000) by Mavridis publications
- Shipwreck in Hell (2000)
- The palakida of Zeus of author Kasiani-Annita Koutsouvelis (2001), by Pitsilos publications
- Loneliness of Klinovatis of poet Despina Kontaxis (2010)
- The purple kiss of poet Despina Kontaxis (2011).
- Nostalgia of poet Hara Dafnas (2011).
- Anthology of poetry and prose, dedicated to 100 years from the year born of academician, poet Nikiforos Vrettakos (2012).
- Floating shadows of poet Hope Maniatis (2012).
- I am angry of poet Gregory Christidis (2013)
- Anthology of poetry, dedicated to 150 years from the year born of poet Constantine P. Cavafy (2013). [23]
- The Black pomegranate of poet Paul Angel (2013), Vakhikon versions
- Crawling of poet Gregory Christidis (2014)
- Deposit soul of poet Christina Iakovidis (2014), Arnaoutis versions
- Suffice a spark of poet Venus Drakopoulos-Sardis (2015), Ostria versions
- Agiographic calendar of painter Marilena Fokas (2016).He curate the calendar and wrote critic prologue.
- Agiographic calendar of painter Marilena Fokas(2017).He curate the calendar and wrote critic prologue.

== Participation with written versions-albums ==
- In mane of winds of poet Niki Filopoulos (1994)
- Asia Minor, Triglia and refuge of author Sofia Yarenis. Historical time for unredeemed lands. (1999)
- The history of life from Triglia, Greece and Asia Minor of author Sofia Yarenis. Historical reference and study. (2001)
- Pleated, anthology forms of speech. (2001)
- Magazine "Kouarios" Issue 33-34 (2004). Posted critical study.
- Magazine "Umbrella" issue September–November 2005. Published his critical approach for the book The stars burned of author Kiki Segditsas, ed. Livanis.
- Literary Calendar (2005) of Municipality of Kavala, ed. Municipal Library of Kavala.
- WesternMakedonika letters, 2nd Volume (2008)
- Magazine "Umbrella" of Makis Apostolatos issue March–May 2008. Published by the study The conceptual consciousness approach in painting of painter Nikos Engonopoulos.
- Magazine "Umbrella" issue September–November 2008. Posted his study-work The erotic, historical and social element in author M. Karagatsis.
- Magazine "Umbrella" issue September–November 2009. Posted his study-work Author Thanasis Kostavaras:Ηe expresses the generation of losers.
- Tributes to poet Yiannis Koutsoheras (2009).
- Revealed Enlightened-Illuminati of author Nikolaos Laos. (2009) .In this book there is his study "Mysticism and Art" and a reference to his winning poem Truncated ideologies
- The Excess of Political Economy of author Nikolaos Laos (2012). In the book there is reference to his poem "Other consciousness ."
- Poetic diary, Iolkos editions (2012). It includes the award-winning poem Closely
- Poetic diary, Iolkos editions (2013). Includes poem Consciousness received
- The Lord of island Ro of author Yiannis Alexakis, (2013). Historical, cultural narrative time.
- 4o Anthology Union Cultural Institutions of Evros (2014)
- Anthology of poetry, Ostria editions (2015). It includes his award-winning poem life path.
- Poetic diary, Iolkos editions (2016). Includes his poem.
- Poetic diary, Iolkos editions (2017). Includes his poem.

== Journalism ==
He works as an art critic in the press and electronic media. As an art critic, he worked with newspapers and magazines. He has published articles and essays on art history, theory of modern art, sculpture, iconography and painting. He compiled monographs and recursive lists artists and essays with aesthetics, philosophy, history, sociology of art. Actively engaged for several years in the union movement in unions, associations and unions. It is many years a member of the Periodical and Electronic Press Union (ESPIT) and the European Federation of Journalists (EFJ) which has developed industrial action.

== Distinctions ==
- Diploma and medal value of Group Athletics Olympias.
- Official Award by Unesco.
- Special prize from the Lions Club of Athens.
- 1st prize poem from the Panhellenic Federation of Resistance Organizations (POAO).
- Honorary plaque from the Athens Association of Parents.
- 1st prize poem by Free Press newspaper.
- 2010 Bid Excellence for cultural and social action.
- Title knight and honorary medal of Officer of Hospitalierice Order of St. Lazarus of Jerusalem.
- First essay award from the European Society of Scientists Writers - Artists (EEELK).
- First poetry award from the European Society of Scientists Writers - Artists (EEELK).
- Award from the Lions Club Maroussi.
- Honorary plaque from the Association Retired Army Officers (EAAS).

== Personal life ==
He is married to artist-painter Marilena Fokas.

== Sources ==
- Book Asia Minor, Triglia and refuge (1999) pp. 232–235
- Book The life story of the Triglia Greece and Asia Minor (2001) pp. 197–205.
- Μagazine Alexisfero Annual Volum edition (2001) pp. 26, 27, 76, 77.
- Dictionary Dictionary 2000 Outstanding Artists and Designers of the 20th of Cambridge Century (2001) p. 209.
- Anthology Pleated, anthology forms of speech, (2001) pp. 290–294.
- Magazine National Resistance, Issue 112 October–December 2001, p. 5
- Magazine Kouarios, No. 33-34. (2004). pp. 95
- Book Art Flame version Ministry of Culture (2005).
- Calendar-Album Literary Calendar edition of Municipal Library of Kavala(2005)
- Album Art exhibition from 1945 to 2005.60 years later (2006), pp. 91
- Album 31 Years of Amateur Theatre in Kavala (2008), pp. 32
- Book Consciousness sayings, (2008).
- Album WesternMakedonika Letters (2008), p. 280.
- Dictionary WHO IS WHO IN GREECE. (2008), p. 1026.
- Magazine Umbrella, issue March–May 2008, pp. 95–96
- Magazine Umbrella, issue September–November 2008. pp. 29–32.
- Album Art exhibition for the 90 years of the Greek Communist Party (2008), pp. 215
- Album Art exhibition of the Development Association of West Attica (2008), pp. 87
- Magazine Umbrella, issue September–November 2009, pp. 51–54.
- Book Tributes to Yiannis Koutsoheras (2009). pp. 84
- Book Version History Terms of Kavala, (2010), pp. 216
- Book Consciousness Archive (2011).
- Encyclopedia Great Encyclopedia of Modern Literature of Haris Patsis, (2011), pp. 224–226.
- Book Overcoming the political economy (2012) of Nicholaos Laos, p. 189, bus versions.
- Book The Lord of island Ro (2013), pp. 54.
- Anthologio 4o Anthologio Union Cultural Institutions of Evros (2014) pp. 105–106
- Anthology Anthology of poetry, Ostria editions (2015), pp. 110
- Encyclopedia Great Encyclopedia of Modern Literature of Haris Patsis, (2015) pp. 312–315
- Diary Poetic Diary, Iolkos Publications (2016), pp. 188
