= Araniti =

Araniti may refer to:

- Arianiti family, a noble Albanian family
- Santo Araniti (born 1947), Italian criminal and a member of the 'Ndrangheta

== See also ==
- Aranitasi
- Aranitović
