= Skala Sykaminea, Lesbos =

Skala Sykaminea, Lesbos Σκάλα Συκαμινέας / Σκάλα Συκαμιάς
- Settlement
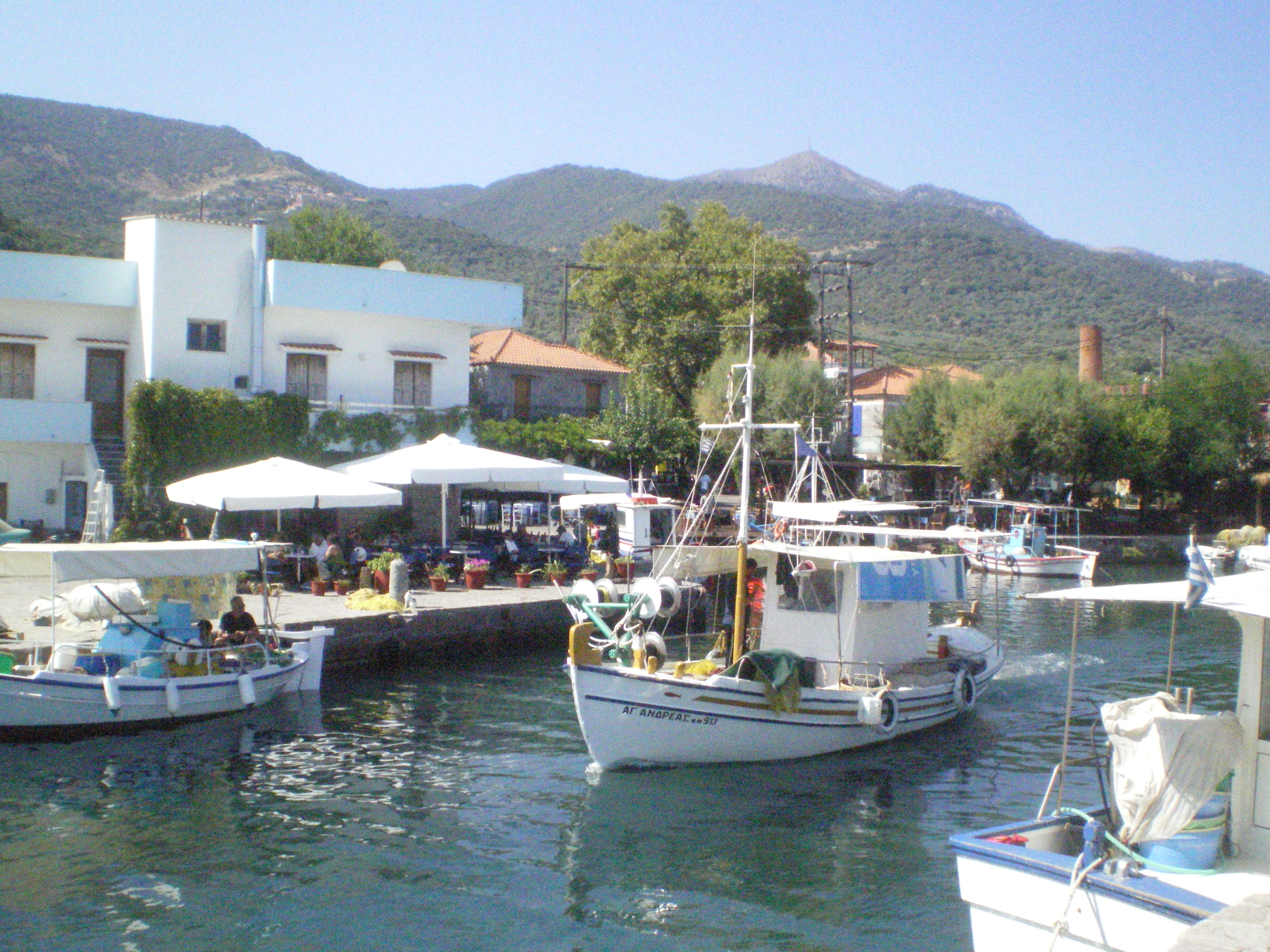
- A view of the port at Skala Sykaminea

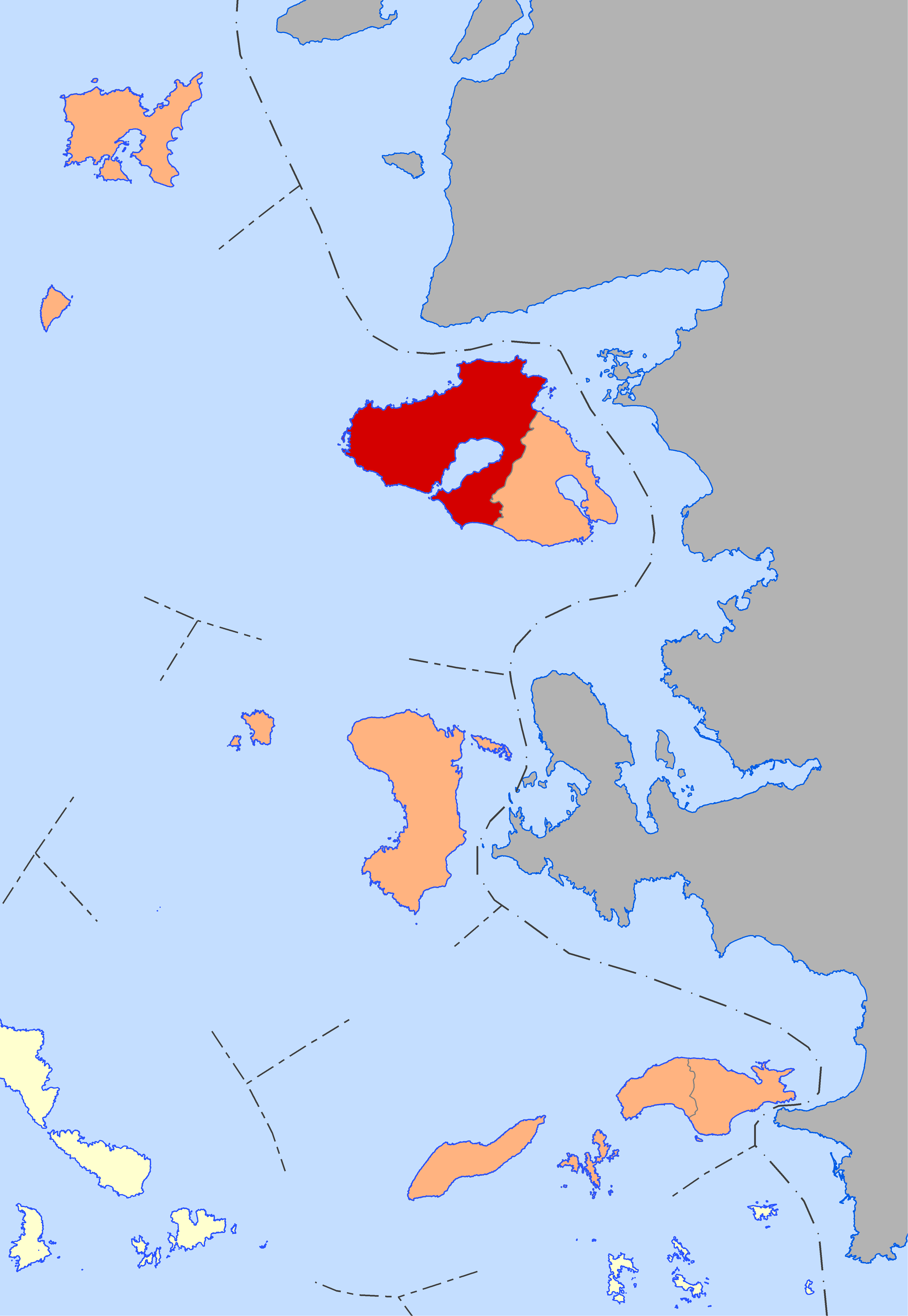
- Location within the region

- Location within Greece
- Country: Greece
- Administrative region: North Aegean
- Regional unit: Lesbos
- Municipality: West Lesbos
- Municipal unit: Mithymna

Area
  - Rural: 0.71 km^{2} (0.27 sq mi)
  - Municipal unit: 50.17 km^{2} (19.37 sq mi)
- Highest elevation: 24 m (79 ft)
- Lowest elevation: 0 m (0 ft)

Population
  - Total: 158
  - Municipal unit: 1,933
  - Municipal unit density: 38.53/km^{2} (99.79/sq mi)
- Demonym: Sykaminean
- Time zone: UTC+2 (EET)
  - Summer (DST): UTC+3 (EEST)
- Postal code: 811 04
- Area code: 22530
- Vehicle registration: MY

Skala Sykaminea is a small fishing village on the Northern coast of the island of Lesbos, Greece, 49 km north-west of Mytilene, the capital of the island. It is located in the municipality of West Lesbos.

Skala Sykaminea was established as a permanent residential settlement following the 1922-1923 population exchange between Greece and Turkey. For centuries prior to this, the town was used as coastal fishing harbor and port by the residents of the main mountainous village of Sykaminea which sits 3 kilometers uphill, south of Skala Sykaminea.

== Geography and Climate ==
Skala Sykaminea sits on the northern coast of the island of Lesbos and is approximately 12 kilometers south from the Aegean coast of Turkey.

The village serves as the seaside port for the mountainous, stone village of Sykaminea, which sits roughly 3 kilometers uphill along the slopes of Mount Lepetymnos (the island's highest peak). It is positioned approximately 49 kilometers north-west of Mytilene (the island's capital) and is 11 kilometers east from the popular tourist town of Mithymna (Molyvos).

The village experiences traditional Mediterranean climate with hot, dry summers and mild, wet winters. July and August are the hottest months with average highs at around 30 °C with occasional Meltemi winds from the north-west (86 °F), whereas January and February are the coldest months were the wind blows from the north and can lead to cold periods. Winter temperatures can get down to 9 °C (48 °F) and it can occasionally snow.

== History ==
For decades, the village of Skala Sykaminea has been known for its small harbor, local tavernas, and deep roots in traditional Greek literature and folklore.

Skala Sykaminea has always been located by the sea, allowing fishermen to use the curved harbor as a base for daily catches and net mending. On the edge of the harbor, a small Greek Orthodox church named Panagia Gorgona (Παναγια Γοργονα) sits perched on a large rock outlooking the Aegean Sea. The church is named after a Greek Maritime folklore icon which depicts The Virgin Mary with mermaid like features instead of human features. Its most famous for its small size and how it inspired the Greek writer Stratis Myrivilis to write his famous 1948 novel, The Mermaid Madonna.

=== 1922-1923 Population Exchange ===
The 1922-1923 population exchange was a compulsory transfer of roughly 2 million people in January 1923, following the end of the Greco-Turkish war in 1922. It forced around 1.5 million Greek Orthodox Christians from the Anatolian Peninsula and Thrace into Greece, and roughly 500,000 Muslims from Greece into Turkey.

Following The Burning of Smyrna (Izmir) in September 1922, many Greek Orthodox Christians fled across the narrow straight between Anatolia and Lesbos in wooden fishing boats. Skala Sykaminea was one of the closest and safest harbors to get to. Today, most of the current residents of the village are direct children, grandchildren and great-grandchildren of the original refugees from 1922.

Syrian and Iraqi refugees arrive at Skala Sykaminea.

=== The Modern Refugee Crisis ===
Skala Sykaminea was a big focus during the 2015-2016 European migrant crisis. Century-old history repeated when thousands of different refugees from various Middle Eastern countries (Syria, Iraq, and Afghanistan) arrived onto the shorelines of Skala Sykaminea, where the villages' ancestors has landed in 1922.

A total of 800,000 refugees landed on the shores of Greece and with Lesbos being the third largest island in Greece and only 6.5 kilometers from the Turkish coast, it became a frontline for the crisis. At its peak, 3,000 people were arriving on the shores each day.

Because of their family histories, many of the elderly residents of the village welcomed the migrants with hospitality, providing them with food, clothes and shelter. This act of kindness gave the village global recognition and earned several local grandmothers a nomination for the Nobel Peace Prize in 2016, symbolizing the shared trauma of migration across the Aegean. Later on, because of the longevity of the migrant crisis, this welcoming and hospitality faded.

== Economy ==
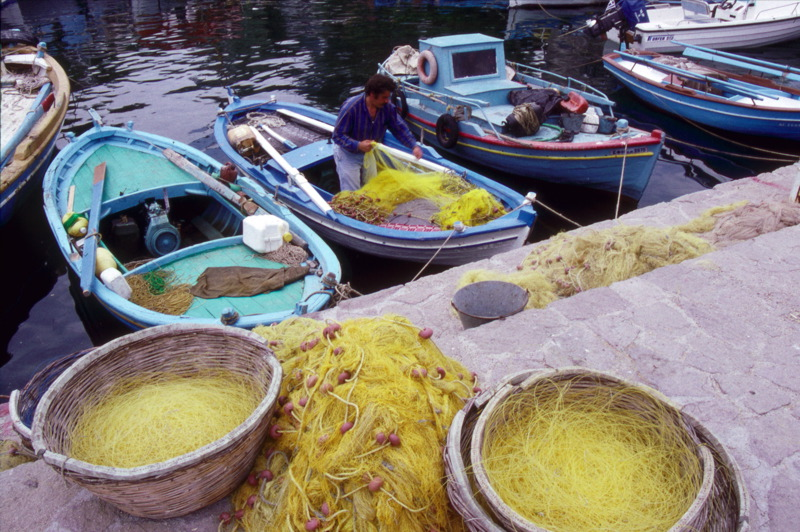
Fisherman at the harbor of Skala Sykaminea.

Small scale fishing and seasonal tourism are the main sources of income for the residents of Skala Sykaminea. Fishing is a core historical and commercial pillar, providing fresh fish to local and regional markets. Tourism serves the village mostly in the summer months. Visitors support local tavernas and cafes, alongside occasional boat trips to nearby hubs such as Molyvos. Olive oil is also made in the higher regions of the village near Mount Lepetymnos and Sykaminea.

== Landmarks and Architecture ==
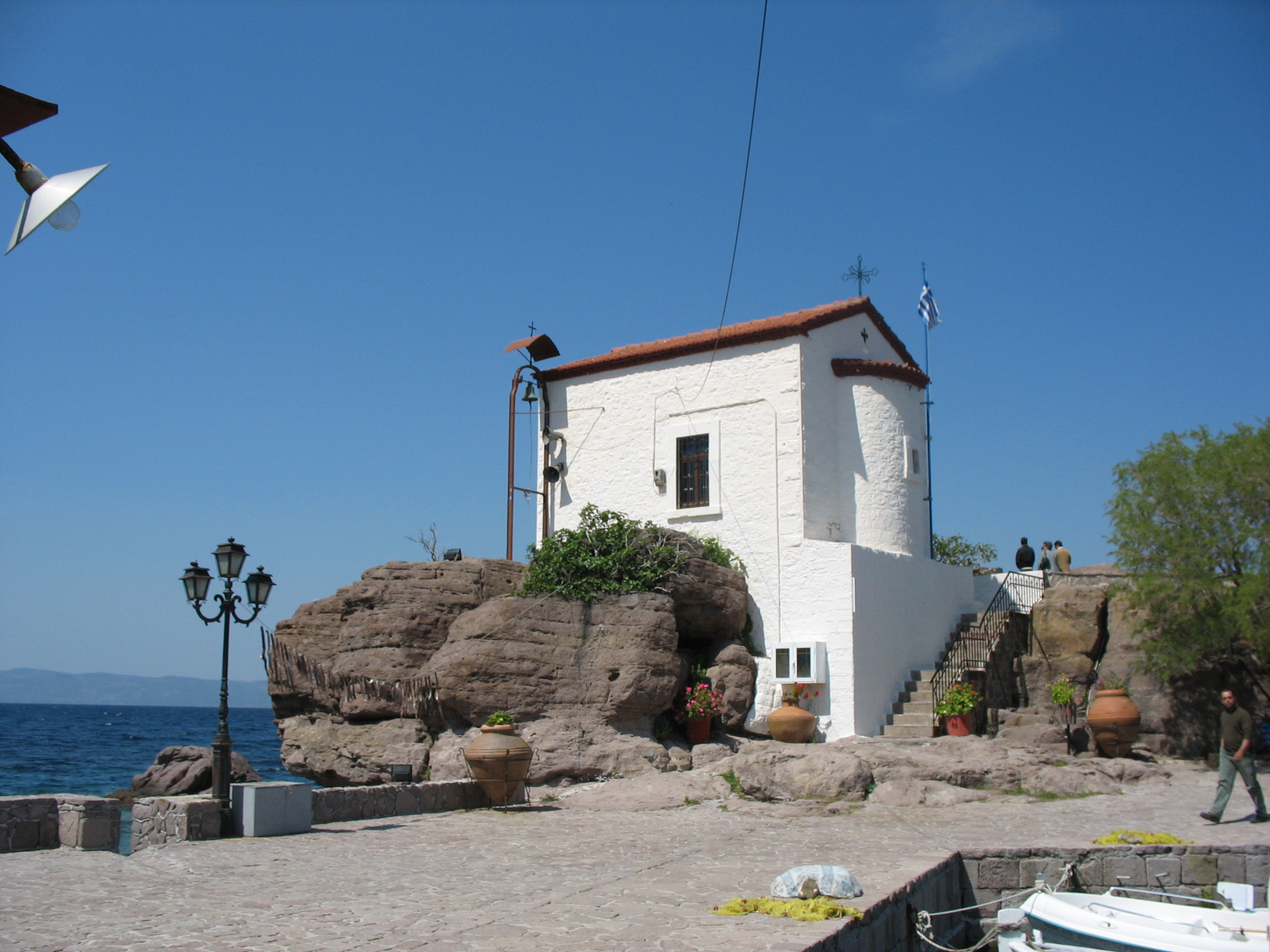
The Greek Orthodox Church of Panagia Gorgona.

Skala Sykaminea primarily defined by its traditional North-Aegean stone craftsmanship, vernacular maritime structures, and Ottoman-era influences. Homes are made using thick stone walls specifically designed to keep the interior cool during summers and retain heat during winters.

The main architectural element of the village is the Greek Orthodox church, Panagia Gorgona. The church derives its unique name from a local maritime folk fresco, depicting the Virgin Mary with a mermaid's tail rather than traditional Byzantine art styles.

== Administrative Structure and Population Development ==
With the end of Ottoman rule, Skala Sykaminea was recognized as a settlement in 1920. Along with three other rural communes, it was incorporated into the then municipality of Mithymna following the 1997 municipal reform. The 2010 administrative reform merged the island communes into the newly created municipality of Lesbos. Since the 2019 administrative reform, Sykaminea has been part of the newly formed municipality of West Lesvos.

Name	1920	1928	1940	1951	1961	1971	1981	1991	2001	2011	2021
Sykaminea	691	816	713	855	494	375	332	273	207	169	158
Skala Sykaminea	67	177	200	855	157	154	159	153	164	140	158
Total	758	993	913	855	651	529	491	426	371	309	316
