= Lilika Nakos =

Greek journalist and writer

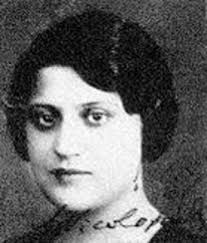
- Native name: Λιλίκα Νάκου
- Born: February 24, 1904 Athens, Greece
- Died: May 25, 1989 (age 85) Athens, Greece
- Occupation: Journalist, novelist, short story writer
- Notable works: I Kyria Ntoremi, I Kolasi Ton Paidion (The Children's Inferno)

Ioulia "Lilika" Nakos (also Nakou; Greek: Ιουλία (Λιλίκα) Νάκου; February 24, 1904 – May 25, 1989) was a pioneering Greek journalist and writer.

She has been described as one of the "grandes dames of modern Greek literature." According to scholar Deborah Tannen, she was "one of the first women writers of modern Greek prose and for many years the only woman in Greek journalism."

== Early life and education ==
Ioulia Nakos, known by the nickname Lilika, was born in Athens in 1904, although her date of birth is somewhat disputed. Her father was Loukas Nakos, a member of parliament. Both her father and her mother, Eleni Papadopoulos, were from upper-class families, and she spent much of her childhood traveling around Europe.

In 1911, Nakos moved to Geneva, Switzerland, with her mother. She studied at the Conservatoire de Musique de Genève and then the University of Geneva. Her youth in Geneva brought her into contact with the international pacifist left, which had a significant impact on her perspective throughout her life.

== Writing career and war years ==
From 1924 to 1929, Nakos lived in Davos, where she was helping her only great love, George Ventiris, recover from tuberculosis. While there, she began writing, and her stories were published in Paris magazines. Then, in 1928, her first book, Photini, was published in Paris, and subsequently in Greek translation in Athens.

After living with Ventiris in Paris in 1929, the following year she returned to Greece, where she became a member of the Generation of the '30s literary movement. Alongside such writers as Elli Alexiou, Galateia Kazantzakis, Zoe Karelli, and Maria Polydouri, she is considered one of the first women to contribute significantly to Greek literature.

In 1932, she published her first Greek-language fiction collection, I Xepartheni. She also began collaborating internationally with other anti-fascist writers. In this decade, she worked as a high school in Crete and Athens, and established a puppet theater in the capital. Nakos became known as one of the first women to write prose in Greek, and to frankly depict women's coming-of-age stories.

She also began working as a journalist, writing from 1934 to 1941 for the newspaper Akropolis. Then, in the mid-'40s, she wrote for the papers Ethnos and Embros. She was politically active, both in her writing and as a member of such organizations as the Greek League for Women's Rights. During the Metaxas dictatorship, she helped sequester communists in her family's home in the Athens suburbs.

From 1937 to 1939, she was married to Constantine Foskolos. Their relationship ended in divorce.

In 1941, during the Axis occupation of Greece, Nakos worked as a volunteer nurse. She suffered significant physical and emotional trauma in this period. Her 1944 book I Kolasi Ton Paidion collected stories she wrote based on her experiences treating children during the ensuing famine. It was published in English translation as The Children's Inferno: Stories of the Great Famine in Greece in 1946.

With the death of her mother in 1947, due to the long-term effects of starvation during the war, Nakos returned to Switzerland, where she settled in Lausanne. She wrote for French-language newspapers in Switzerland and Paris from 1947 to 1955, and then for the Greek publication Ora, before retiring with a pension from the Journalists' Union in 1958. She also wrote several more books throughout the 1950s and '60s, and became particularly known for her 1955 work I Kyria Ntoremi ("Mrs. Doremi"), which is considered her only comic novel.

== Later years ==
After suffering paralyzing back pain, Nakos began spending time recovering in Icaria on a doctor's advice. In 1967, while on the island, she was severely paralyzed due to sciatica and returned permanently to Athens.

In 1979, her book Oi Parastratimenoi ("The Lost") was made into a television series, followed by a serial based on I Kyria Ntoremi in the 1980s, drawing renewed attention to her work. She died in 1989 at age 81.

== Selected works ==
- Photini (1928)
- I Xepartheni (1932)
- Oi Parastratimenoi (1935)
- I Zoi tou Edgar Poe (1936)
- I Kolasi Ton Paidion (1944)
- Nafsika (1953)
- I Kyria Ntoremi (1955)
- Anthropina Pepromena (1955)
- Yia Mia Kainouryia Zoi (1960)
- Oi Oramatistes Tis Ikarias (1963)
- Prosopikotites pou Gnorisa (1965)
- To Chroniko Mias Dimosiografou (1980)
- I Istoria tis Parthenias tis Despoinidas Tade (1981)
