= Stylianos Alexiou =

Greek art historian and archaeologist (1921–2013)

Dr. Stylianos Alexiou
- Στυλιανός Αλεξίου
- Born: 13 February 1921; Heraklion, Crete, Greece
- Died: 12 November 2013 (aged 92); Heraklion, Crete, Greece
- Occupations: Professor, museum director, government minister, writer
- Known for: Excavation of Late Minoan tombs on Knossos, Early Minoan tombs on Lesbos; critical editions and critical commentary on Byzantine and Modern Greek prose and poetry and linguistics

Academic work
- Discipline: Archaeologist, linguist
- Sub-discipline: Minoan Crete; Byzantine and Modern Greek literature

Stylianos Alexiou (Greek: Στυλιανός Αλεξίου, 13 February 1921 – 12 November 2013) was an archaeologist, philologist and university professor.

== Biography ==
Stylianos Alexiou was born in 1921 in Heraklion, Crete. He came from a learned family: his father was Lefteris Alexiou (1890–1964), a writer and philologist and he had Elli Alexiou and Galatea Kazantzakis (the first wife of Nikos Kazantzakis) for his aunts. His grandfather was the homonymous Stylianos Alexiou, the scholarly publisher of newspapers in Heraklion.

He studied at the School of Philosophy in the University of Athens (1939–46), from which he took his doctorate in 1959. He received a scholarship from the Centre national de la recherche scientifique and remained for the academic year 1951–52 at the Ecole Normale Superieure in Paris, and from 1960 to 1961 he was at the University of Heidelberg on scholarship from the Alexander von Humboldt Foundation.

In 1947 he worked as Prefect of Antiquities on Rhodes and in 1950 transferred to the Heraklion Archaeological Museum. In 1960–61 he served as Ephor of Antiquities for Southern Crete, which has its seat in Chania, and in 1962 he took over direction of the Heraklion Archaeological Museum, until 1977 when he quit the General Ephorate of Antiquities. In 1973 and 1977 he had a place on the Archaeological Council of the Hellenic Ministry of Culture. In 1977 he began to teach at the Philosophical School of the University of Crete and in 1982 he was elected as the first professor of Mediaeval & Modern Greek literature in that school.

From 1963 to 1964 he was the international editor of Kritkon Khronikon, a member of the editing committee of the epigraphic periodical Kadmos in London, and a member of such learned societies as the German Archaeological Institute, the British School at Athens, the Archaeological Society, the Association International d' Etudes Byzantines, the Society for Byzantine Studies, the Christian Archaeological Society, the Hellenic Folklore Society, the Society for Cretan Historical Studies, and finally, a Commendatore of the Italian Republic. In 1981, he was honoured with the title of Corresponding Member of the Hellenic Folklore Society.

In 1992 he was honored by the University of Padua for his contributions to Minoan archaeology and to Byzantine and Modern Greek philology. In 1993 the critical faculty of the National Literary Awards honoured him for all his inspired work with the Special National Literary Award for Literature (1993), while in November 2000 he received an honorary doctorate from the University of Athens.

== Archaeological work ==
His principal archaeological works are the excavations of the chamber graves of Katsambas (the harbour of Knossos) from 1951 to 1963 and the early Minoan tholos tombs of Levinos-Lenda in 1958–66, his re-organisation and expansion by one-third of the Heraklion Archaeological Museum, with the addition of new wings (five new rooms with about twenty new exhibits), the founding of the Museums of Chania (1962) and Agios Nikolaos (1969), the development of the theory of the coordinated and anactoric character of the Minoan emporium (1958), the identification of the fortifications of Minoan Crete, his research on Luxor in Egypt, the study of Minoan sanitary cisterns (1972), and the location of Panormus-Apollonius and other cities of Greek Crete (1974). Finally, he attended to the special legislative designation of and protection of the Knossos area.

== Linguistic work ==
He had discovered the earliest works of Cretan literature, back in 1952 in his study of the Erotokritos. His works on the subject number six books and thirty essays or contributed articles, with the most important being his linguistically restored edition of the Erotokritikos published in 1980. According to Nicholas Panayotakis "...constituted one of the leading achievements of Modern Greek philology, a real landmark and tour-de-force..." Likewise, he produced the critical Voskopoula, the Apokopos which does not accept the didactic, moral and eschatalogical character human affairs that so many researchers since have presented and the Erofili. He published many revisions, new interpretations, and observations on editions of texts, old and new, of literary criticism and Cretan theatre.

== Works ==
=== Books ===
==== Monographs ====
- Greek: Μινωικός πολιτισμός, Ηράκλειο,1964 [Minoan Civilization] (English translation 1968, German 1976, French 1979)
- Greek: Υστερομινωικοί τάφοι Λιμένος Κνωσού (Κατσαμπά), Βιβλιοθήκη της εν Αθήναις Αρχαιολογικής Εταιρείας, Αθήνα, 1967 [The Late Minoan tombs of the Harbour of Knossos (Katsambas)]
- Greek: Οδηγός Μουσείου Κρήτης, Ηράκλειο, 1953 [Directory of the Museum of Crete]
- Greek: Από το ποιητικό έργο του Νίκου Καζαντζάκη, Ηράκλειο, 1977 [From the poetic work of Nikos Kazantzakis]
- Greek: Ακριτικά.Το πρόβλημα της εγκυρότητας του κειμένου Ε.Χρονολόγηση-αποκατάσταση χωρίων ερμηνευτικά, Ηράκλειο 1979 [The Akritic Lays: The Problem of the validity of Text Five, Dating & reconstruction of the villages hermeneutically]
- Greek: Γλωσσικά μελετήματα, Αθήνα,1981 [Linguistic Studies]
- Greek: Η Κρητική λογοτεχνία και η εποχή της. Μελέτη φιλολογική και ιστορική. Στιγμή, Athen 1985 [Cretan literature and its epoch. Philological and historical studies.]
- Greek: Δημώδη βυζαντινά: μελέτες,εκδ. Στιγμή, Αθήνα, 1997 [Studies in the Byzantine Vernacular, Stigmi editions, 1997]
- Greek: Κρητικά φιλολογικά: μελέτες, εκδ Στιγμή, Αθήνα, 1999 [Studies in Cretan Philology, Stigmi editions, 1999]

==== Anthologies ====
- Greek: Κρητική Ανθολογία, 1954 [Cretan Anthology]
- Greek: Απόκοπος, Η Βοσκοπούλα (δεύτερη ενιαία εκλαϊκευμένη έκδοση), Ερμής,Αθήνα, 1971 [Apokopos & Vaskopoula: Second Unabridged Popular Edition]

==== Translations ====
- Shakespeare, William, 1564–1616, Greek: Σονέτα,μετάφραση, Στιγμή, 1998 [Sonnets, a Translation, Stigmi edition, 1998]
- Greek: Συλλογικό έργο, Το εντευκτήριον, Στιγμή, 2004 [Collaborative work, The Chamber, Stigmi edition, 2004] (translations of works of John Keats, Charles Baudelaire, Owen Meredith, Stephane Mallarme, Stefan George, Henri de Regnier, Francis Jammes, W.B.Yeats and T.S.Eliot into Greek)
- Greek: Συλλογικό έργο, Κατάλογος 24, Στιγμή, 2009 [Collaborative work, "Catalogue 24", Stigmi edition, 2009] (Contributor of a commentary on and translation of Homer)

==== Critical editions ====
- Greek: Η Βοσκοπούλα, πιμενικό ειδύλλιο του 1600, Ηράκλειο, 1963 [The Voskopoula, a poetic idyll of 1600]
- Greek: Βιτσέντζος Κορνάρος,Ερωτόκριτος, Ερμής, 1980 (ανατυπώσεις: 1984, 1994, 2000) [Vitsentzos Kornaros, Erotokritos]
- Greek: Βασίλειος Διγενής Ακρίτης και το άσμα του Αρμούρη. Κριτική έκδοση, εισαγωγή, σημειώσεις, γλωσσάριο. Ερμής, Athen 1985 [Basil Digenes Akrites and the Song of Armouris. Critical edition with introduction, notes, and glossary]
- Greek: Διονύσιου Σολωμού, Ποίηματα και πεζά, εκδ.Στιγμή,Αθήνα, 1994 [ Dionysios Solomos, poems and prose Sigmi edition, 1994]
- Greek: Διονύσιου Σολωμού, Στοχασμοί,μετάφραση, εκδ Στιγμή, Αθήνα, 1999 [Dionysios Solomos, Meditations, Stigmi editions, 1999]
- Greek: Σολωμός, Διονύσιος, 1798-1857, Ο Κρητικός, εκδ.Κίχλη 2013 [ Dionysios Solomos, 1798-1857, The Cretan, Kikhli edition, 2013]
- Greek: Σολωμός, Διονύσιος, 1798-1857, Διάλογος,εκδ Στιγμή 2014 [ Dionysios Solomos, 1798-1857, Dialogue, Stigmi edition, 2014]
- Greek: Σολωμός, Διονύσιος, 1798-1857, Ο Κρητικός, εκδ.Στιγμή 2014 [ Dionysios Solomos, 1798-1857, The Cretan Stigmi edition, 2014]
- Greek: Σολωμός, Διονύσιος, 1798-1857, Ο Λάμπρος, εκδ.Στιγμή 2014 [ Dionysios Solomos, 1798-1857, Lambros, Stigmi edition, 2014]
- Greek: Σολωμός, Διονύσιος, 1798-1857, Οι ελεύθεροι πολιορκημένοι, εκδ.Στιγμή 2014 [ Dionysios Solomos, 1798-1857, The Free Besieged, Stigmi edition, 2014]

=== Articles ===
- Greek: Η Μινωϊκή θεά μεθ΄ υψωμένων χειρών, Κρητικά Χρονικά τομ.ΙΒ (1958), σσ. 179-299 [The Minoan Goddess with Upraised Hands, Kritika Chronia, vol. XII, pp. 179-299]
- Greek: Ανάκτορο και πόλις στη μινωική Κρήτη: μια νέα θεωρία για την κρητική κοινωνία, Εποχές, 9, (1964), σελ. 422-466["The palace and city in Minoan Crete: a new theory of Cretan community", Epoches, 9, 1964, pp. 422–466]
