= Ridi Pagliaccio =

Ridi Pagliaccio (Laugh Clown) may refer to:

- "Ridi, Pagliaccio", line from the aria "Vesti la giubba" from the opera Pagliacci
- Ridi pagliaccio, 1988 classical crossover album by Mina
- Ridi, Pagliaccio, 1909 novella by Galateia Kazantzakis
- Ridi, pagliaccio!, 1919 play by Fausto Maria Martini filmed in 1928 as Laugh, Clown, Laugh
- Ridi pagliaccio (film), 1941 film starring Fosco Giachetti and Laura Solari
