= Andreas Embirikos =

Greek surrealist poet and psychoanalyst

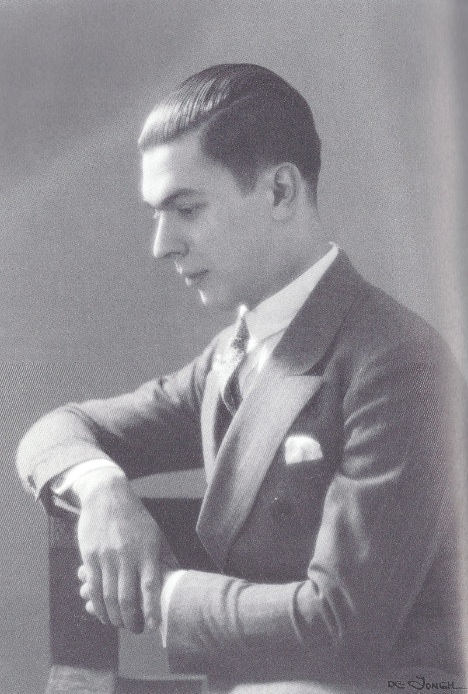
- Andreas Embiricos in Lausanne, 1920
- Native name: Ανδρέας Εμπειρίκος
- Born: 2 September 1901 Brăila, Kingdom of Romania
- Died: 3 August 1975 (aged 73) Athens, Greece
- Occupation: Psychoanalyst, writer, poet
- Education: National and Capodistrian University of Athens, University of Genoa
- Literary movement: Surrealism, Generation of the '30s
- Notable works: The Great Eastern, Ypsikaminos

Andreas Embirikos (Note: Also Embiricos) (/ɛmbɪˈrɪkɒs/; Greek: Ανδρέας Εμπειρίκος [embiˈrikos] Andréas Empeiríkos; September 2, 1901 – August 3, 1975) was a Greek surrealist poet, writer, photographer, and one of the first Greek psychoanalysts. As a writer, he emerged from the Generation of the '30s and is considered one of the most important representatives of Greek surrealism. He studied psychoanalysis in France and was the first to practice it as a profession in Greece in the years 1935–1951. Out of his entire literary work, his first collection of poetry, titled Ypsikaminos, stands out as the first purely surrealist Greek text. Among his prose works, his bold erotic novel The Great Eastern was completed over a period of several decades becoming the lengthiest modern Greek novel. Described as Embirikos' "lifework", It was received with both praise and criticism for its libertine nature and highly erotic content. A large part of Embirikos' work was published well after his death.

== Life ==
Embirikos was born in 1901 in Brăila, Romania into a wealthy Greek family. His father Leonidas Embirikos was an important ship-owner and politician. A year later, his family moved to Ermoupolis on the Aegean island of Syros. When Embirikos was only seven years old they moved to Athens. While he was still a teenager his parents divorced; he started studying at the School of Philosophy of the National and Capodistrian University of Athens, but he decided to move to Lausanne to stay with his mother without graduating from the university.

The following years Embirikos studied a variety of subjects both in France and in the United Kingdom where he studied at King's College London; however it was in Paris where he decided to study psychoanalysis together with René Laforgue and joined the International Psychoanalytical Association.

=== Timeline ===
- 1929 Meets with the surrealists and is interested in automatic writing.
- 1931 Returns to Greece and works for some time at the shipdocks.
- 1934 Develops an intermittent companionship to Marguerite Yourcenar.
- 1935 Gives the famous lecture On surrealism (Περί σουρρεαλισμού) in Athens and publishes Blast furnace; a pure surrealist text.
- 1940 Gets married with poet Matsi Hatzilazarou; nevertheless, they divorced four years later. The same year he divorced (1944), despite his leftist sympathies, he was taken hostage by the communist OPLA after the Dekemvriana events in Athens and was treated in a humiliating way. On the road he managed to escape.
- 1947 Gets married for the second time with Vivika Zisi. A year later, his father, with whom Embeirikos' relationship was rather normal, dies in Geneva.
- 1962 Together with Yorgos Theotokas and Odysseas Elytis, he was invited to travel to the USSR by the "Greco-Soviet" Union; the trip inspired him to write the poem ES ES ES ER Rossia.
- 1975 He dies in Kifissia; his mother preceded him by only two years.

== Poetry ==
Andreas Embirikos

His poetry can be defined by two major tendencies. On the one hand, he was one of the major representatives of surrealism in Greece. His first poetic collection, Ipsikaminos (i.e. blast furnace), was a heretic book, characterized by the lack of the punctuation and the peculiarity of the language. As the poet himself admitted it was precisely the originality and extravagance of his work that contributed to his relative commercial success.

On the other hand, together with Yorgos Seferis, Embirikos was the most important representative of the "Generation of the '30s". He contributed greatly to the introduction of modernism in Greek letters and he helped change once and for all the poetic atmosphere of Greece.

== Megas Anatolikos ==
Α significant work by Embirikos is his most popular novel The Great Eastern (Μέγας Ἀνατολικός) written between 1940–c. 1970 and published only after his death in 1990. In this work, Embirikos narrates the first trip of the ocean liner Great Eastern from England to America. Embirikos describes the Great Eastern as a hedonic vessel, where the multitude of the passengers enjoy love without and beyond limits. During the ten-day trip (an allusion to the Decameron) they discover a new form of happiness and innocence. For this work, Odysseas Elytis called Embirikos "a visionary and a prophet".

== Literary critic ==
Embirikos also wrote articles of literary criticism; at least two of them are worth-mentioning. The first is "The hidden necrophilia in the works of Edgar Allan Poe"; the second, "Nikos Engonopoulos or the miracle of Elbassan and Bosphorus".

== Photography ==
Embirikos was an enthusiastic photographer all his life, and the sheer volume of his photographic work, no less than his passionate involvement with the medium, suggest that it was, for him, very nearly as important an activity as writing. Yiorgis Yiatromanolakis (Γιώργης Γιατρομανωλάκης), Embirikos's principal Greek scholar, has written that "his three principal identities are those of a poet, a novelist and a photographer". For his part, Embirikos's son, Leonidas, has referred to his father's "vast, vertiginously extensive photographic archive... the negatives alone exceeding 30,000 items".

Embirikos only ever publicly exhibited his photographs once in his lifetime, showing a limited number of prints at the Ilissos gallery in Athens, in 1955. However, as part of the celebrations for the centenary of his birth in 2001, the photographer and critic John Stathatos (Γιάννης Σταθάτος) was commissioned to research the archive and curate a large exhibition at the Technopolis Arts Centre in Athens. A substantial monograph incorporating Stathatos's text was simultaneously published by Agra Editions.

== Selected works ==
- Ypsikaminos (Ὑψικάμινος), 1935
- Hinterland (Ἐνδοχώρα), 1945
- Writings or Personal Mythology (Γραπτά ἤ Προσωπική Μυθολογία), 1960
- ES ES ES ER Rossia (ΕΣ ΕΣ ΕΣ ΕΡ Ρωσσία), 1962
- Argo or Aerostat Flight (Ἄργώ ἤ Πλούς Αεροστάτου), 1964
- Oktana (Ὀκτάνα), 1980
- Every Generation or Today as Tomorrow and as Yesterday (Αἱ Γενεαί Πᾶσαι ἤ Ἡ Σήμερον ὡς Αὔριον καί ὡς Χθές), 1985
- Armala or Introduction to a City (Ἄρμαλα ἤ Εἰσαγωγή σέ μία πόλι), 1985
- The Great Eastern (Ό Μέγας Ἀνατολικός), 1990
- Zemphyra or The Secret of Pasiphaë (Ζεμφύρα ή Το Μυστικόν της Πασιφάης), 1997
- Nikos Engonopoulos or the Miracle of Elbassan and Bosphorus, 2000
- Lecture 1963, 2000
- Prologue to the Greek edition of Marie Bonaparte's book Deuil, nécrophilie et sadisme: à propos d'Edgar Poe (Η λανθάνουσα νεκροφιλία στο έργο του Έδγαρ Πόε), 2000
- A Case of Obsessive-Compulsive Neurosis with Premature Ejaculations and Other Psychoanalytic Texts (Μια Περίπτωσις Ιδεοψυχαναγκαστικής Νευρώσεως με Πρόωρες Εκσπερματώσεις και Άλλα Ψυχαναλυτικά Κείμενα), 2005
- A translation of Pablo Picasso's The Four Little Girls, 1980
- Amour, Amour: Writings or Personal Mythology (tr. Nikos Stangos, Alan Ross), 1966
