= Aranitović =

Aranitović (Serbian Cyrillic: Аранитовић) is a Serbian surname.

Notable people with the surname include:

- Aleksandar Aranitović (born 1998), Serbian basketballer
- Jovo Aranitović (born 1974), Montenegrin retired footballer
- Petar Aranitović (born 1994), Serbian basketballer

== See also ==
- Araniti
- Aranitas, a village in Fier County, Albania
- Aranitasi
- Aranitsis
