= The Great Eastern (Embirikos novel) =

Novel written by Andreas Embirikos

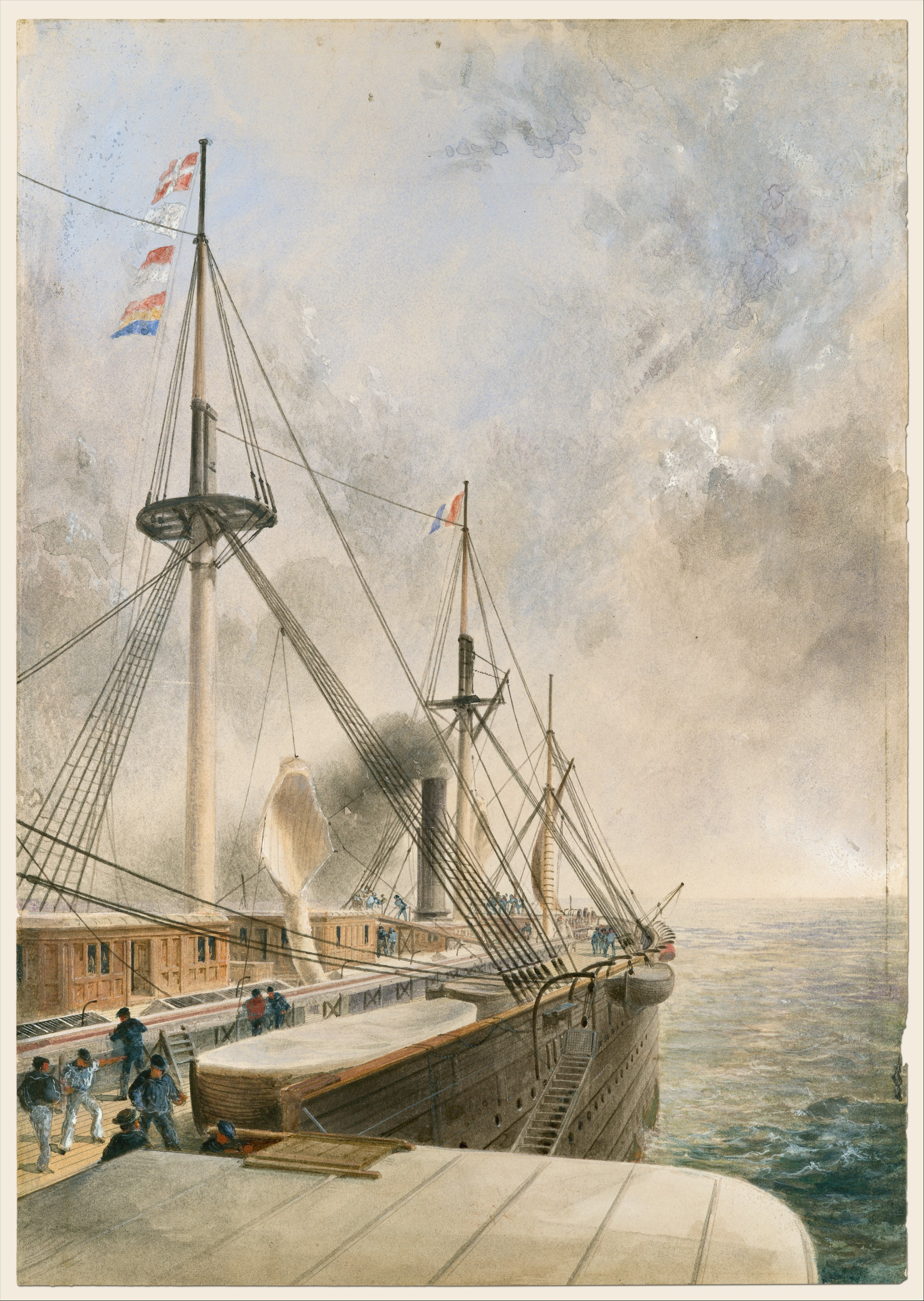
- Painting of the Great Eastern by Robert Charles Dudley, 1865, Metropolitan Museum of Art.
- Author: Andreas Embirikos
- Original title: Ο Μέγας Ανατολικός
- Language: Greek
- Published: 1990–1992
- Publication place: Greece

The Great Eastern (Greek: Ὀ Μέγας Ἀνατολικός, romanized: Ho Mégas Anatolikós) is a novel by Greek writer and poet Andreas Embirikos. Described as the author's "lifework", it is the largest modern Greek novel, of approximately 2,100 pages, comprising in its final form five parts and spanning over a hundred chapters. Its writing lasted from 1945 to 1951, though the author continued to work on the project until its final version became standardized around 1970. The book was first published in eight volumes in the period 1990–1992, fifteen years after the writer's death.

Described as the most daring Greek novel, it has been received with both unbridled enthusiasm and harsh criticism. Its libertine nature and highly erotic content provoked reactions, allowing it to be compared to other well-known works of erotic literature, such as Marquis de Sade's 120 Days of Sodom. The novel is centred around the maiden voyage of the British ocean liner Great Eastern sailing from Liverpool, England to the United States in May 1867. Passengers of various social backgrounds and different nationalities embark on a ten-day trip through the Atlantic, during which time they find themselves abandoning all their ethical predispositions and any sense of moral restraint. The role of the Greek poet Andreas Sperchis, one of the few Greek characters on the ship, is by general consensus recognized as partly autobiographical. The text is written predominantly in the Greek katharevousa of the late 19th century, although it encompasses other linguistic styles as well.

== Sources ==
- Beaton, Roderick (1999). An Introduction to Modern Greek Literature. Clarendon Press. ISBN 0198159749.
- Skarpalezou, Andromachi (1967). "Συνέντευξη με τον Ανδρέα Εμπειρίκο" [Interview with Andreas Embirikos]. Heridanos (in Greek) (4).
- Vagenas, Nasos (2001). "Ελλειμμα νηφαλιότητας: Επίλογος στο Έτος Εμπειρίκου". ΤΟ ΒΗΜΑ (in Greek).
- Elytis, Odysseas (1980). Αναφορά στον Ανδρέα Εμπειρίκο [A reference to Andreas Embirikos] (in Greek). Ypsilon.
