= Yiorgos Theotokas =

Greek novelist (1905-1966)

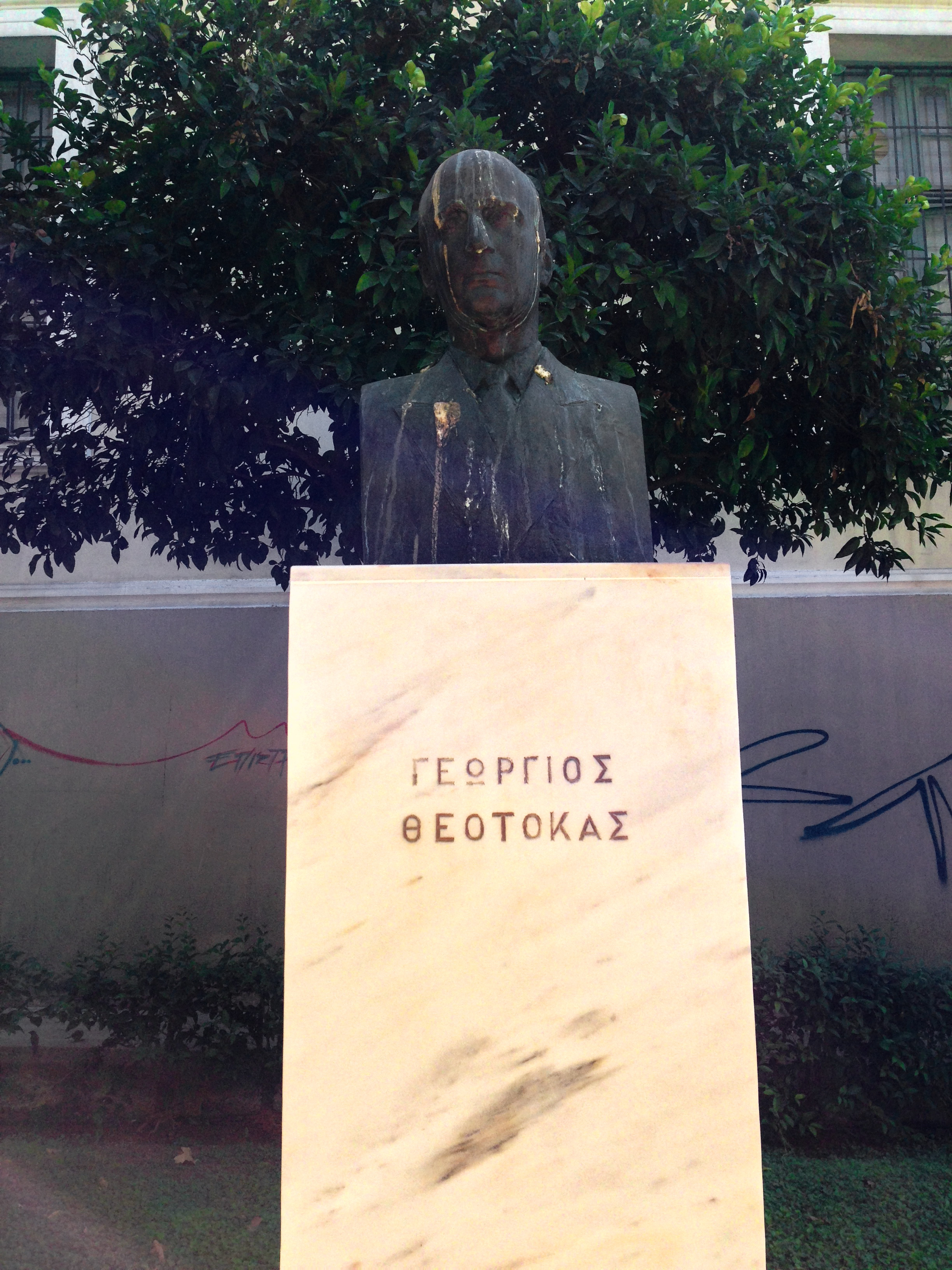
Bust of Theotokas in Elliniko, Greece

Yiorgos Theotokas (Greek: Γιώργος Θεοτοκάς), formally Georgios Theotokas (Γεώργιος Θεοτοκάς; 27 August 1905 – 30 October 1966), was a Greek novelist.

== Biography ==
He was born in Constantinople, Ottoman Empire (now Istanbul, Turkey).

He became one of the main representatives of the "Generation of the '30s". After studying in Athens, Paris, and London, his first essay was Free Spirit (1929). This was followed by three novels before World War II: Argo (1936), The Demon (1938), and Leonís (1940). His first and most influential novel, Argo, dealt with the problems of young people growing up in difficult and turbulent times.

After the war he became more involved with the theatre, and was twice director of the Greek National Theatre.

Today he is perhaps best remembered for his friendship and correspondence with major figures of the Generation of the Thirties including the Nobel prize-winners George Seferis and Odysseas Elytis; but Argo remains in print.

He died in Athens.

== Bibliography ==
=== Novels ===
- Αργώ (Argo), Vol. 1: 1933, Vol. 2: 1936
- Το Δαιμόνιο (The Demon), 1938
- Λεωνής (Leonís), 1940
- Ασθενείς και Οδοιπόροι (Patients and Travellers), Part 1 (Ιερά Οδός): 1950, full edition: 1964
- Οι Καμπάνες (The Bells), 1970
- Σημαίες στον ήλιο (Flags in the Sun), including Λεωνής and Παιδική ηλικία (Childhood), 1985

=== Short stories ===
- Ευριπίδης Πεντοζάλης και Άλλες Ιστορίες (Evripidis Pendozalis and other stories), 1937

=== Essays ===
- Ελεύθερο Πνεύμα (Free Spirit), 1929 (using the pseudonym Ορέστης Διγενής - Orestis Digenis)
- Εμπρός στο Κοινωνικό Πρόβλημα, 1932
- Στο κατώφλι των Νέων Καιρών, 1945
- Προβλήματα του Καιρού Μας, 1956
- Πνευματική Πορεία, 1961

=== Plays ===
- Αντάρα στ' Ανάπλι (Scud in Nafplion)
- Το Γεφύρι της Άρτας
- Όνειρο του Δωδεκάμερου
- Το Κάστρο της Ωριάς
- Το Παιχνίδι της Τρέλας και της Φρονιμάδας
- Συναπάντημα στην Πεντέλη
- Το Τίμημα της Λευτεριάς
- Πέφτει το Βράδυ
- Αλκιβιάδης
- Ο Τελευταίος Πόλεμος
- Λάκαινα
- Σκληρές Ρίζες
- Η Άκρη του Δρόμου

=== Travel literature ===
- Δοκίμιο για την Αμερική (Essay for America)
- Ταξίδι στη Μέση Ανατολή και στο Άγιον Όρος (Journey to Middle East and Mount Athos), 1961
- Ταξίδια: Περσία, Ρουμανία, Σοβιετική Ένωση, Βουλγαρία (Journeys: Persia, Romania, Soviet Union, Bulgaria)

=== Other works ===
- Ώρες Αργίας (Leisure Hours), 1931
- Ημερολόγιο της "Αργώς" και του "Δαιμονίου" (Diary of "Argo" and "the Demon"), 1939
- "Τετράδια Ημερολογίου 1939-1953" (Diary Books 1939-1953)
- Στοχασμοί και Θέσεις (RPonderings and Positions), Political texts: 1925-1949 & 1950-1966, Vol. 1 & 2
- Η Ορθοδοξία στον Καιρό Μας (Orthodoxy in Our Times)
- Μια Αλληλογραφία (A Correspondence of Letters)

== Translations ==
- Leonis, tr. Donald E. Martin (1985)
- Argo, tr. E. M. Brooke, A. Tsatsopoulos (1951)
