= Vasilis Arvanitis =

Vasilis Arvanitis (Greek: Ο Βασίλης ο Αρβανίτης) is a novella by the Greek writer Stratis Myrivilis set on the island of Lesbos (Mytilene) in the 1910s.

== Setting ==
The novella is set in Myrivilis' home village of Sykamnia on the island of Lesbos in the first decade of the 20th century. At that time the island had a mixed population of Greeks and Turks who, although they lived in the same villages, nevertheless conducted their affairs separately. The Greeks, who were in the majority, resented not being their own masters and dreamed of the day when they would break free from Turkish rule and unite with mainland Greece.

That day came on 8 November 1912, and with it came the end of four and a half centuries of Ottoman rule. The action, then, is set in the final days of Greek and Turkish coexistence on the island.

== Characters ==
=== Narrator ===
In the novella the narrator, who may or may not be the author himself, "looks back with nostalgia to the lost world of his childhood" and "summons up from his memory, Vasilis… The anarchic and self-willed spirit of Vasilis fascinates him but also, one feels, disturbs him". In his attempt to understand the nature of Vasilis' heroism he concludes that Vasilis is like a spring of cool water in an uninhabited wasteland, useless and inexplicable to his fellow men, but a great joy to God.

=== Protagonist ===
Beverley Farmer provides one of the best descriptions of the narrator's hero Vasilis: "Virile, beautiful, amoral, fierce and magnanimous by turns and always dangerous, he is no social or political rebel. He is pure revolt: a force of nature, burning bright". According to Pavlos Andronikos, Myrivilis "wanted his hero, Vasilis Arvanitis, to be an expression of the Greek spirit at its most heroic, but in attempting that, he created one of the most enigmatic heroes in the Greek tradition: a godless, anarchic, and free spirit to haunt the twentieth century and remind us of the 'hunted bird' inside each of us which 'still struggles to free itself but cannot'.”

== Publication history ==
Vasilis Arvanitis first appeared in an Athenian newspaper in 1934 as a short story. In 1939 a second, much longer version was included in a collection of short stories by Myrivilis entitled The Blue Book, but this was again revised and extended during the period of the German occupation of Greece and was published as a separate volume late in 1943, with woodcut illustrations by Panos Valsamakis. The 3,200 copies of this first edition sold out within a very short time so that a second edition had to be published in 1944. This second edition should be regarded as the definitive version of Vasilis Arvanitis. A comparison with the 1943 edition reveals numerous differences, all slight, which suggest that Myrivilis used the opportunity of a second edition to make amendments and corrections to the work. However it is the 1943 version which continues to be printed. The work has been translated into English, German, Spanish, Danish, Swedish, Czech, and Turkish.

== Reception ==
From the first, Vasilis Arvanitis was greeted with critical acclaim. Apostolos Sahinis, reviewing it in 1944, described it as "a book which can without hesitation be considered faultlessly perfect", and another reviewer, K. Despotopoulos, decided that "with Vasilis Arvanitis, Myrivilis has arrived at the peak of his artistic maturity and, at the same time, has brought this genre of our prose fiction to perfection". Perhaps, however, the judgement which pleased Myrivilis most was that given by the poet Angelos Sikelianos, who, comforting Myrivilis soon after the German occupation of Greece, embraced him, saying: "Don't worry, as long as books like your Vasilis Arvanitis... are being written, Greece will endure".

The Australian novelist and short story writer Beverley Farmer described the English translation of Vasilis Arvanitis as "a jewel of a book".

== Legacy ==
The classical composer Yiannis Papaioannou (Greek: Ιωάννης Παπαιωάννου) wrote a musical work with the title Vasilis Arvanitis (1945).

== Bibliography ==
Translations

- Vasilis Arvanitis translated into English by Pavlos Andronikos (Armidale: University of New England Publishing Unit, 1983). Much of the material for this article is taken from this book.
- Arnavut Vasil translated into Turkish by Cem Kaşkarlı (İstanbul: Belge Yayınları, 1997).

Criticism

- Pavlos Andronikos, "The Narrator of Vasilis Arvanitis: An Exploration into Emotional Response to the Reading of Fiction". In The Text and Its Margins: Post-Structuralist Approaches to Twentieth-Century Greek Literature (Eds. Margaret Alexiou & Vassilis Lambropoulos. New York: Pella Publishing Co., 1985), pp. 85–122.
- Beverley Farmer, “A Force of Nature, Burning Bright”, Australian Book Review, Dec./Jan. 1984.
- Vassilis Lambropoulos, "Stratis Myrivilis, Vasilis Arvanitis” (Review) Modern Greek Studies Yearbook 2 (1986) p. 366.
- Dimitris Tziovas, The Other Self: Selfhood and Society in Modern Greek Fiction (Lexington Books, 2003).
