= Yiannis Papaioannou =

Greek composer and teacher

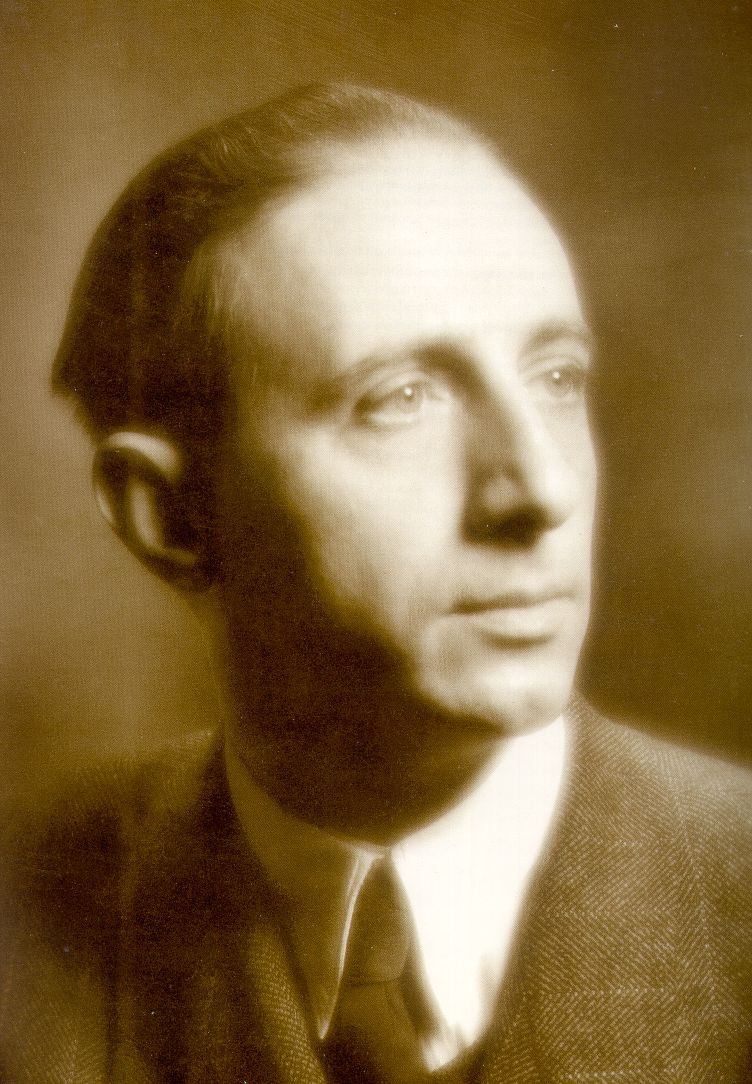

Yiannis Papaioannou (Greek: Ιωάννης Ανδρέου Παπαιωάννου; 6 January 1910 – 19 May 1989) was a Greek composer and teacher of the Modern Era.

== Early life ==
Papaioannou was born in Kavala in 1910. Shortly after the Balkan Wars, his family fled Kavala, in order to avoid the Bulgarian Occupation of the city. He studied piano with Marika Laspopoulou and composition with Alekos Kontis at the Hellenic Conservatory in Athens (1922–34), as well as the piano and orchestration with Emilios Riadis in Thessaloniki (1928–29).

== Career ==
In 1949 he visited major European music centres on a UNESCO grant and became familiar with new developments in music composition. In particular, in Paris he attended Arthur Honegger's class. Between 1951 and 1961 he taught music at an Athens high school and from 1953 he was professor of counterpoint and composition at the Hellenic Conservatory. He was the first president of both the Greek section of the International Society for Contemporary Music (1964–75) and the Hellenic Association for Contemporary Music (1965–75). Papaioannou played a pivotal role in the inception of the festivals of Contemporary music which were financially backed by various institutions, including the Greek Tourist Organisation and several foreign entities.

Papaioannou was the first musician to systematically teach atonal, 12-note and serial techniques before 1970. His compositional career falls into five main phases: Early Impressionist (1932–8), National School (1939–43), Hindemithian neo-classicism combined with elements of Byzantine music (1944–52), 12-note period (1953–1966) and the last period (1966–89) in which he developed an entirely personal technique.

Papaioannou died in Athens in 1989.

== Works ==
- Stage: Agnos (dramatic idyll, 1937); Sklavas lytrossi [Liberation of a Slave Woman] (choreographic tableau, 1945); Pirates (ballet, 1952); Himoniatiki fantasia [Winter Fantasy] (ballet, 1951); Antigone (ballet, 1965) etc.
- Orchestral: 5 Symphonies.: 1946, 1947, 1953, 1963, 1964; Idhyllio [Idyll], 1938; O koursaros [The Corsair], 1939; Choreographic Prelude, 1940; 3 Piano Concertos, 1940, 1952, 1989; Poiema tou dhasous [Forest Poem], 1942; Vasilis Arvanitis, 1945; Triptych, str, 1947; Orthros ton psychon [Matin of Souls], 1947; Pygmalion, 1950; Hellas (P.B. Shelley), nar, orch, 1956; Images d’Asie, suite, 1961; India, suite, 1961; Meteorissi [Suspended in the Air], vc, orch, 1979 etc.
- Vocal: Dafnis ke Chloi (G. Drossinis), chorus, orch/pf, 1933; I kidheia tou Sarpidhonos [The Funeral of Sarpedon] (cant., C. Cavafy), 1966; O fotofraktis [The Aperture] (A. Embeirikos: Octana), 1982; Encomium (Kotsiras), 1984–5; I logosteméni psychi [The Exhausted Soul] (O. Votsi), 1986; 2 Songs (G. Byron), 1989 etc.
- Chamber and Solo instrumental: Nocturno, 1935; Burlesca, 1936; I parlata tou Arlekinou (La parlata d’Arlecchino) [the Harlequin's Speech], tuba, 1971; Halkografia [Engraving], hn, pf, 1977; Dioyssiakon [Dionysiac], db, 1978; Erotiki exomologhissi tou Minotavrou [Love Confession of the Minotaur], tuba, pf, 1978; Aétoma, 1987; Caryatid, 1987; Sonata, 1988 etc.

== Sources ==
1. The New Grove Dictionary of Music and Musicians
