= Ypsikaminos =

1935 poetic collection by Andreas Embirikos

- Author: Andreas Embirikos
- Original title: Υψικάμινος
- Language: Greek
- Genre: Surrealism
- Publisher: Kastalia
- Publication date: 1935
- Publication place: Greece
- Pages: 76

Ypsikaminos (Greek: Υψικάμινος, lit. 'Blast furnace') is the first poetic collection by Greek poet and writer Andreas Embirikos. It was published in 1935 in Athens—the author's first published work—and it is considered the first purely surrealist Greek text.

== Content ==
The book comprises a collection of sixty three prose poems. Unusual for its time, it was received with skepticism and derision by contemporary literary circles. The work raised concerns for its near unintelligibility as well as the abrupt juxtaposition of linguistic styles that were until then considered incompatible. The poet frequently used elements of the Greek literary language (Katharevousa)—an unconventional choice in poetry of the era—and by mixing it with that of Demotic, targeted the diglossic conventions of his time, essentially by violating them. Ypsikaminos introduced an innovative way of writing poetry in Greece. To achieve a diversion from conventional writing, the poet used the method of écriture automatique (automatic writing), which had already been used by the surrealists of Paris, as well as the unconscious mind, which he had learned from his studies in psychoanalysis.

== Sources ==
- Beaton, Roderick (1999). An Introduction to Modern Greek Literature. Clarendon Press. ISBN 0198159749.
