= Aranitasi =

Aranitasi is an Albanian surname.

Notable people with the name include:

- Mustafa Aranitasi (1872–1961), Albanian military commander, politician and Minister of War
- Xhemal Aranitasi (1886–1961), Albanian general and commander-in-chief of the Royal Albanian Army

== See also ==
- Aranitas, a village in Fier County, Albania
- Araniti
- Aranitović
- Aranitsis
