= 1979 Nobel Prize in Literature =

Award

- Odysseas Elytis
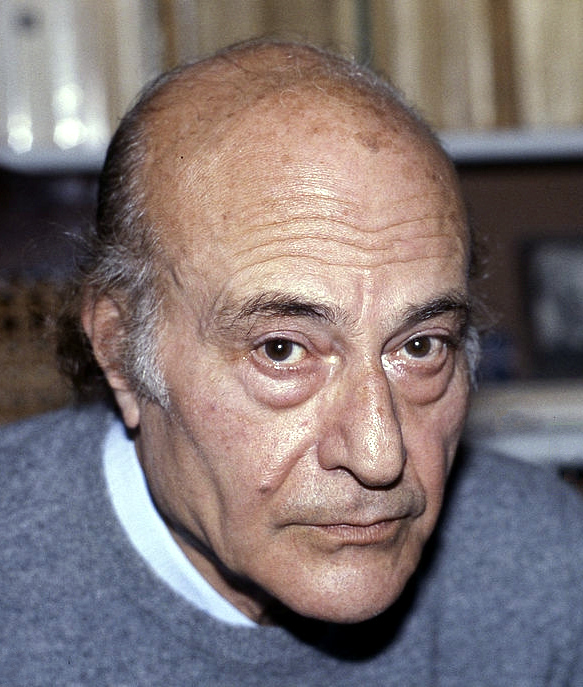
- "for his poetry, which, against the background of Greek tradition, depicts with sensuous strength and intellectual clear-sightedness modern man's struggle for freedom and creativeness"
- Date: 18 October 1979 (announcement); 10 December 1979 (ceremony)
- Location: Stockholm, Sweden
- Presented by: Swedish Academy
- First award: 1901
- Website: Official website

The 1979 Nobel Prize in Literature was awarded to the Greek poet Odysseas Elytis (1911–1996) "for his poetry, which, against the background of Greek tradition, depicts with sensuous strength and intellectual clear-sightedness modern man's struggle for freedom and creativeness." He is the second Greek recipient of the literature prize after another poet Giorgos Seferis in 1963.

== Laureate ==
Influences of surrealism meet traditional Greek literature in the poetry of Odysseas Eytis. Most of his poems celebrates light, the sun, his native country's historic ruins, the blue sea, and the rocky terrain of Greece. Elytis' experiences during World War II introduced a darker element and tone into his poetic world. One of his most prominent works is Άξιον Εστί ("It Is Worthy", 1959), in which poetry and prose intermingle as in old Byzantine liturgy. His other significant oeuvres include Έξη και μια τύψεις για τον ουρανό ("Six Plus One Remorses For The Sky", 1960), Ο ήλιος ο ηλιάτορας ("The Sovereign Sun", 1971), Τα Ρω του Έρωτα ("The Trills of Love", 1973).

== Reactions ==
In the media speculations, Graham Greene was the favourite to win the 1979 Nobel Prize in Literature. Other frequently guessed winners included Jorge Luis Borges, Gabriel Garcia Marquez (awarded in 1982) and Simone de Beauvoir.

The Swedish Academy's decision to award Elytis was criticized in the Swedish press. Several commentators said that the politically radical poet Yiannis Ritsos would have been a better choice, or that the prize should have been shared between the two Greek poets. The Greek newspaper Ta Nea agreed with this criticism.

On being awarded the prize, Odysseas Elytis commented: "The Swedish Academy's decision was not only an honor for me but for Greece and its history through the ages. I believe that it was a decision to bring international attention to the most ancient tradition in Europe, since from Homers time to the present there has not been a single century during which poetry has not been written in the Greek language."

== Award ceremony speech ==
At the award ceremony in Stockholm on 10 December 1979, Karl Ragnar Gierow of the Swedish Academy said:

For Greek poetry the contact with surrealism meant a flowering which allows us to call the last fifty years Hellas’s second highwater mark. In none of the numerous important poets who have created this age of greatness can we see more clearly than in Elytis what this vigorous cross signified: the exciting meeting between epoch-making modernism and inherited myth (...) [But] Elytis will have nothing to do with its [surrealism] fundamental poetry (...) Even if its violent display of unproven combinations released his own writing, he is a man of strict form, the master of deliberate creation.

[In his relationship to the Greek myths he] imitates no myths at all and attacks those compatriots who do. (...) He sees his Greece with its glorious traditions, its mountains whose peaks with their very names remind us how high the human spirit has attained, and its waters the Aegean Sea, Elytis’s home, whose waves for thousands of years have washed ashore the riches that the West has been able to gather in and pride itself on. For him this Greece is still a living, ever-active myth, and he depicts it just as the old mythmakers did, by personifying it and giving it human form. It lends a sensuous nearness to his visions, and the myth that is the creed of his poetry is incarnated by beautiful young people in an enchanting landscape who love life and each other in dazzling sunshine where the waves break on the shore.

We can call this an optimistic idealization and, despite the concreteness, a flight from the present moment and reality. Elytis’s very language, ritually solemn, is constantly striving to get away from everyday life with its pettiness. The idealization explains both the rapture and the criticism that his poetry has aroused. Elytis himself has given his view of the matter, point by point. Greek as a language, he says, opposes a pessimistic description of life, and for la poésie maudite it has no expressions. For west- Europeans all mysticism is associated with the darkness and the night, but for the Greeks light is the great mystery and every radiant day its recurrent miracle. The sun, the sea and love are the basic and purifying elements.
