= The Mermaid Madonna =

Book by Stratis Myrivilis

The Mermaid Madonna is a novel written by Greek writer Stratis Myrivilis. The work has been translated into English by Abbott Rick. The work, set in Greece after the First World War is, according to Kirkus Reviews, "poetic" and contains relatively little dialogue.
