= Jovo Aranitović =

Montenegrin footballer

Personal information
- Full name: Jovan Aranitović
- Date of birth: 19 August 1974 (age 52)
- Place of birth: Pljevlja, SFR Yugoslavia
- Height: 1.82 m (5 ft 11 1/2 in)
- Position: Defender

Senior career*
Years	Team	Apps	(Gls)
1995–1996	Obilić		
1996–1997	Red Star Belgrade	2	(0)
1997–1998	Sloga Kraljevo		
1998–2000	Beograd		
2000-2001	Borac Banja Luka		
2001	Železnik	3	(0)
2002	Radnički Kragujevac	2	(0)
2002	Rudar Pljevlja	10	(0)
2003	Javor Ivanjica	9	(0)
2003–2004	Győri ETO	5	(0)
2004–2005	Obilić	9	(0)
2005	Borac Banja Luka		
2006	Makedonija GP	1	(0)
2006–2008	BASK	22	(0)
2008	Novi Pazar		
2013–2014	Trepča		
- * Club domestic league appearances and goals

Jovan "Jovo" Aranitović (Serbian Cyrillic: Јован "Јово" Аранитовић; born 19 August 1974) is a Montenegrin retired footballer who last played for FK Trepča.

== Club career ==
Born in Pljevlja, SR Montenegro, he spent most of his career in Serbia playing for FK Obilić, Red Star Belgrade, FK Sloga Kraljevo, FK Beograd, FK Železnik, FK Radnički Kragujevac, FK Rudar Pljevlja and FK Javor Ivanjica, playing in the First League of FR Yugoslavia, but he also played abroad, in the Bosnian second tier with FK Borac Banja Luka, in Hungary, with Győr, and in Macedonia, with FK Makedonija Gjorče Petrov. Before retiring, he played in Serbian Second Leagie clubs BASK and Novi Pazar.

By September 2014 he was still active playing with FK Trepča.
