= Stratis Myrivilis =

Geeek writer known for novels, novellas, and short stories

- Στράτης Μυριβήλης
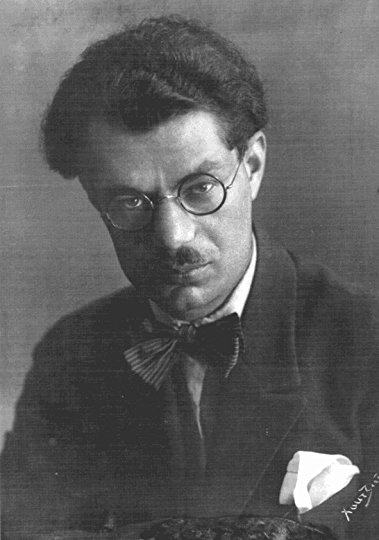
- Stratis Myrivilis c. 1920s
- Born: Efstratios Stamatopoulos (Ευστράτιος Σταματόπουλος); 30 June 1890; Sikaminea, Lesbos, Ottoman Empire (now Greece)
- Died: 19 July 1969 (aged 79); Athens, Kingdom of Greece
- Other name: Stratis Myrivilis
- Education: Gymnasium of Mytilene
- Occupation: Writer
- Era: Generation of the '30s
- Known for: Life in the Tomb (1923-24, 1930)
- Spouse: Eleni Dimitriou
- Children: 3
- Honours: Member of the Academy of Athens; Thrice nominated for Nobel Prize in Literature (1960, 1962, 1963)
- Military career
- Allegiance: Kingdom of Greece
- Branch: Hellenic Army
- Rank: Second Lieutenant
- Unit: 2nd Transport Hospital
- Conflicts: Balkan Wars; First Balkan War; Second Balkan War; Battle of Kilkis-Lachanas (WIA); World War I; Macedonian front; Greco-Turkish War (1919–1922); Battle of Kütahya–Eskişehir

Efstratios Stamatopoulos (Note: Greek: Ευστράτιος Σταματόπουλος) (30 June 1890 – 19 July 1969) was a Greek writer. He is known for writing novels, novellas, and short stories under the pseudonym Stratis Myrivilis. (Note: Greek: Στρατής Μυριβήλης) He is associated with the "Generation of the '30s". He was nominated for the Nobel Prize in Literature three times (1960, 1962, 1963).

== Biography ==
Myrivilis was born in the village of Sykaminea (Συκαμινέα), also known as Sykamia (Συκαμιά), on the north coast of the island of Lesbos (then part of the Ottoman Empire), in 1890. There he spent his childhood years until, in 1905, he was sent to the town of Mytilene to study at the Gymnasium. In 1910 he completed his secondary education and took a post as a village schoolmaster, but gave that up after one year and enrolled at Athens University to study law. However, his university education was cut short when he volunteered to fight in the First Balkan War in 1912. During the Second Balkan War, he was shot twice in the leg in the Battle of Kilkis–Lachanas.

After the Balkan Wars, he returned home to a Lesbos free from Turkish rule and united with the motherland Greece. There he made a name for himself as a columnist and as a writer of poetry and fiction. He published his first book in 1915: a set of six short stories collected together under the general title of Red Stories.

In World War I, Myrivilis saw active service in the army of Eleftherios Venizelos' breakaway government on the Macedonian Front. He later served in the Asia Minor Campaign with the 2nd Transport Hospital at Eskişehir. He returned to Lesbos in 1922, after the Campaign's catastrophic end.

On 28 June 1920 he married Eleni Dimitriou. They had three children.

From April 1923 to January 1924, Myrivilis published, in serialised form, the first version of his First World War novel Life in the Tomb in the weekly newspaper Kambana. A longer, revised version was published in Athens in 1930, and almost overnight, Myrivilis became famous throughout Greece. Life in the Tomb established him as a master craftsman of Greek prose, and the work itself was seen as a turning point in the development of Greek prose fiction, marking its coming of age.

After the success of Life in the Tomb, Myrivilis settled in Athens where he worked as editor of the newspaper Demokratia. The newspaper ceased publication after one year, however, and he made a living writing columns and short stories for various newspapers and periodicals. In 1936, he was made General Programme Director for the Greek National Broadcasting Institute—a post which he held until 1951, excluding the period of German occupation when he resigned after a final broadcast in which he reminded the Greek people of their noble resistance to the Italian invasion of Greece and called on them to continue resisting with dignity and unity.

After the occupation, he was given a post in the Library of Parliament and, in 1946, he founded the National Society of Greek Writers and was elected its first president.

During the Greek Civil War he became one of the most strong opponents of the communists.

In 1958, after having been nominated unsuccessfully six times, he was finally made a member of the Academy of Athens, a belated recognition of his important contribution to Greek literature.

He died, after a long illness, in an Athens hospital on 19 July 1969.

== Major works ==
Novels

- Life in the Tomb (1923-4, 1930)
- The Schoolmistress with the Golden Eyes (1933)
- The Mermaid Madonna (1949)

Novellas

- Vasilis Arvanitis (1943, 1944)
- The Pagana (1945)
- Pan (1946)

Short story collections

- Red Stories (1915)
- Short Stories (1928)
- The Green Book (1936)
- The Blue Book (1939)
- The Red Book (1952)
- The Cherry Red Book (1959)

Translations into English

- Life in the Tomb tr. P. Bien (Hanover, New Hampshire: University Press of New England, 1977) (repr. 1987 London)
- The Schoolmistress with the Golden Eyes translated by Philip Sherrard (London: Hutchinson, 1964)
- The Mermaid Madonna translated by Abbot Rick (London: Hutchinson, 1959)
- Vasilis Arvanitis translated by Pavlos Andronikos. (Armidale: University of New England Publishing Unit, 1983)
- The Step-daughter (short story) translated by Theodore Sampson, in Modern Greek Short Stories vol. 2 (Athens: Kathimerini, 1981, pp. 65–83)
- The Cat's Eye (short story) translated by Irvin Ziemann, in Introduction to Modern Greek Literature: An Anthology of Fiction, Drama, and Poetry ed. Mary P. Gianos (New York: Twayne, 1969, pp. 193–206)

== Sources ==
- Alexiou, Margaret. "Women in Two Novels of Stratis Myrivilis: Myth, Fantasy, and Violence." Modern Greek Studies Yearbook 5 (1989).
- Andronikos, Pavlos. “The Narrator of Vasilis Arvanitis: An Exploration Into Emotional Response to the Reading of Fiction.” In The Text and Its Margins: Post-Structuralist Approaches to Twentieth-Century Greek Literature (Eds. Margaret Alexiou & Vassilis Lambropoulos. New York: Pella Publishing Co., 1985), pp. 85–122.
- Dimitris Tziovas, The Other Self: Selfhood and Society in Modern Greek Fiction (Lexington Books, 2003).
