= Odysseas Elytis =

Greek poet and art critic (1911-1996)

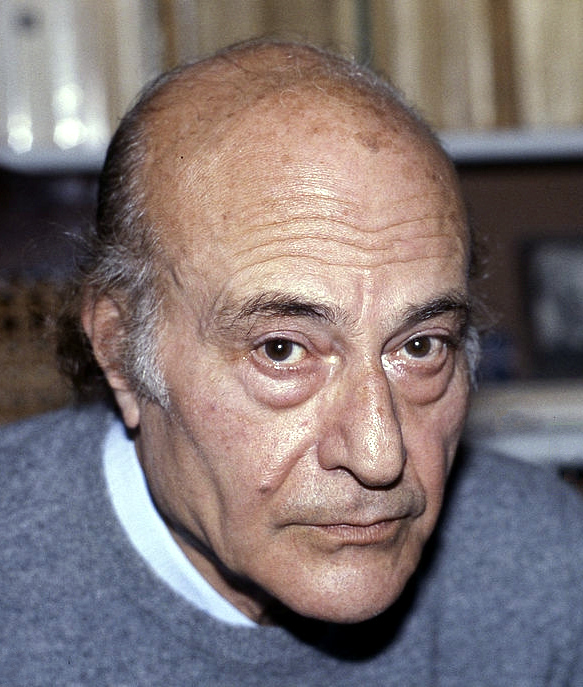
- Elytis in 1974
- Born: Odysseas Alepoudelis; 2 November 1911; Heraklion, Republic of Crete
- Died: 18 March 1996 (aged 84); Athens, Greece
- Education: University of Athens (no degree)
- Occupation: Poet
- Writing career
- Notable awards: Nobel Prize in Literature; 1979
- Movements: Romantic modernism, Generation of the '30s

Odysseas Elytis (/ɛˈliːtɪs/; Greek: Οδυσσέας Ελύτης [oðiˈseas eˈlitis], pen name of Odysseas Alepoudelis, Greek: Οδυσσέας Αλεπουδέλης; 2 November 1911 – 18 March 1996) was a Greek poet, man of letters, essayist and translator, regarded as the definitive exponent of romantic modernism in Greece and the world. He is one of the most praised poets of the second half of the twentieth century, with his Axion Esti "regarded as a monument of contemporary poetry". In 1979, he was awarded the Nobel Prize in Literature.

== Biography ==
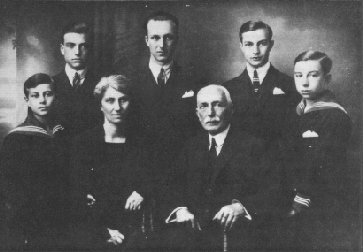
The family of Elytis (Alepoudelis), 1917. He is pictured on the far left wearing a sailor's uniform in the photo of his family.

Panayiotis Alepoudelis and his younger brother Thrasyboulos were both born in the village Kalamiaris of Panagiouthas of Lesbos. Their family had become well-established in the industries of soap manufacturing and olive oil production in Heraklion, Crete in 1895. In 1897 Panagyiotis married Maria E. Vrana (1880–1960) from the village Papados of Gera, Lesbos. From this union and as the last of six siblings, Odysseas was born in the early hours of 2 November 1911.

In 1914, the Alepoudelis family moved to Athens (at Solonos 98B), where his father re-situated the soap factory in Piraeus. In 1918, his older sister and firstborn, Myrsine (1898–1918), died of the Spanish influenza. While on summer holidays from their Athens home as guests on the island of Spetses in the Haramis home in the St Nikolaos neighbourhood, his own father also died in the summer of 1925 from pneumonia. His father, Panayiotis, may have been the inspiration for Elytis to write. Apparently, his father wrote poetry and it remained unpublished. In 1927, worn out with overtiredness, Odysseas was diagnosed with tuberculosis. While in bed recuperating, he voraciously read all the Greek poetry he could and in this year discovered Cavafy. In 1928, he graduated from high school and successfully passed the competitive entrance exams for the Law School at the University of Athens.

He read in the newspapers about the suicide of the poet Kostas Karyotakis. In 1929, Elytis took a sabbatical between high school and university and decided secretly that he must only become a poet. In 1930, he and his family moved to Moschonision 14B. Elytis had initial aspirations to become a lawyer, but did not sit for his final examinations and did not get his legal qualification. He also had expressed aspirations to become a painter in the manner of the surrealists, but his family quickly thwarted this idea.

In 1935, Elytis published his first poem in the journal New Letters (Νέα Γράμματα) at the prompting of such friends as George Seferis. In the same year, he also became a lifelong friend of writer and psychoanalyst Andreas Embirikos, who allowed him to have access to his vast library of books. In 1977, two years after the death of his friend, Elytis wrote a tribute book to Embirikos from within the commonalities that founded their ideas, aptly titled "Reference to Andreas Embirikos" and originally published by Tram publishers in Thessaloniki. His entry to the magazine New Letters in 1935 was in November, which was the 11th issue, and with his pseudonym Elytis established himself therein. With a distinctively earthy and original form in his expression, Elytis assisted in inaugurating a new era in Greek poetry and its subsequent reform after the Second World War. In 1960, his older brother Constantine (1905–1960) died, followed by his mother, Maria Vrana Alepoudelis. Elytis was simultaneously awarded the First National Prize for poetry for his work "Axion Esti".

In 1967, Elytis travelled to Egypt, visiting Alexandria, Cairo, Luxor, and Aswan. Returning to Greece in March, he finished piecing together the fragments of Sappho's verses translated into modern Greek and brought them together with his own diaphanous iconography. These were finally published in 1984 without the drawings, which are deposited separately in the archives of the American School of Classical Studies along with the original manuscripts of the initial translations of Sappho. With the 21st of April Regime (a military junta) in force, Elytis disappeared from public view. At the time of the dictatorship, he lived at Skoufa 26, and upon his return from Paris in 1972, he moved to Skoufa 23 to a fifth floor apartment, his final residence in Athens before he died.

From 1969 to 1972, under the Greek military junta, Elytis exiled himself to Paris after he refused money from the junta and established a modest residence there. In Paris, he lived with Marianina Kriezi (1947–2022), who subsequently produced and hosted the legendary children's radio broadcast Here Lilliput Land. Kriezi was extraordinary, having published a book of poems at the age of fourteen. The title of the book was Rhythms and Beats and she sent a first edition copy to George Seferis along with a handwritten letter asking him to write a page of his poetry in longhand in a fountain pen and gift it to her. Apparently, she was going to put it across from her bed and see it every morning when she awoke for the rest of her life, treasuring the words of poetry. The irony is that she met up with Elytis, who was, in contrast to the cerebral Seferis, unmarried and a poet of the senses. When Elytis died, he was buried wearing the silver wedding band that had the name "Marianina" engraved inside it.

=== The war ===
In 1937, he served his military requirements. As an army cadet, he joined the National Military School in Corfu. He assisted Frederica of Hanover off the train and onto Greek soil personally when she arrived from Germany to marry hereditary Prince Paul. During the war, he was appointed Second Lieutenant, placed initially at the 1st Army Corps Headquarters, then transferred to the 24th Regiment, on the first line of the battlefields. In 1941, he contracted an acute case of typhus abdominalis and was transferred to the Ioanina Hospital to the pathology unit for officers. Elytis came very close to his death here and was given the options between staying at the hospital and being a prisoner when the Germans fully invaded and occupied Greece, or being transferred with the risk of intestinal perforation and hemorrhage. On the eve of the invasion of the German armies, he decided to be transferred to Agrinio and from there eventually back to Athens, where he made a slow but steady recovery during the German occupation. He began to outline poetry for his eventual work "Sun The First"; in Alexandria, Seferis delivered a lecture on Elytis and Antoniou. Elytis was sporadically publishing poetry and essays after his initial foray into the literary world.

He was a member of the Association of Greek Art Critics, AICA-Hellas, International Association of Art Critics.

=== Programme director for ERT ===
He was twice Programme Director of the Greek National Radio Foundation (1945–46 and 1953–54), Member of the Greek National Theatre's Administrative Council, President of the Administrative Council of the Greek Radio and Television as well as Member of the Consultative Committee of the Greek National Tourists' Organisation on the Athens Festival. In 1960 he was awarded the First State Poetry Prize, in 1965 the Order of the Phoenix and in 1975 he was awarded the Doctor Honoris Causa in the Faculty of Philosophy at Thessaloniki University and received the Honorary Citizenship of the Town of Mytilene.

=== Travels ===
In 1948–1952 and 1969–1972, he lived in Paris. There, he audited philology and literature seminars at the Sorbonne and was well received by the pioneers of the world's avant-garde (Reverdy, Breton, Tzara, Ungaretti, Matisse, Picasso, Françoise Gilot, Chagall, Giacometti) as Tériade's most respected friend. Teriade was simultaneously in Paris publishing works with all the renowned artists and philosophers (Kostas Axelos, Jean-Paul Sartre, Françoise Gilot, René Daumal) of the time. Elytis and Teriade had formed a strong friendship that solidified in 1939 with the publication of Elytis' first book of poetry entitled "Orientations". Both Elytis and Teriade hailed from Lesbos and had a mutual love of the Greek painter Theophilos. Starting from Paris, he travelled and subsequently visited Switzerland, England, Italy and Spain. In 1948, he was the representative of Greece at the International Meetings of Geneva, in 1949 at the Founding Congress of the International Art Critics Union in Paris, and in 1962 at the Incontro Romano della Cultura in Rome.

In 1961, upon an invitation of the State Department, he traveled through the US, from March until June, to New York, Washington, New Orleans, Santa Fe, Los Angeles, San Francisco, Boston, Buffalo and Chicago . His return was to Paris to meet up with Teriade and then to Greece — Upon similar invitations in 1962 with Andreas Embirikos and Yiorgos Theotokas (1905–1966) through the Soviet Union to Odessa Moscow and Leningrad. Elytis did not like Yevgeny Yevtushenko when they were introduced but appreciated Voznesensky. That summer he spent part of his holidays on Corfu Island and the rest on Lesbos where he and Teriade, who had returned from Paris, were establishing the foundations of a museum dedicated to the painter Theophilos. In 1964, the inaugural performance of the oratorio to the poetry of the Axion Esti as set to music by Mikis Theodorakis was held. In 1965, he completed the essays that would comprise the book The Open Papers and that summer visited the Greek islands yet again. He visited Bulgaria in 1965 with his friend Yiorgos Theotokas on the invitation of the Union of Bulgarian Authors; it would be their final journey together as Theotokas would die in October 1966. Their guide throughout this country was the poet Elisaveta Bagryana (1893–1991), who had been nominated three times until then for the Nobel prize in Literature. In 1965, he was also bestowed with the Phoenix Cross, the highest honour of the Greek nation.

Elytis was a believer and follower of numerology in all its forms: Biblical, Kabbalah, Chaldean and Pythagorean. He also believed in Vedic astrology and held certain beliefs of Hinduism to be true. Elytis was beset with the untimely death of friends and relatives throughout his life: Yiorgos Theotokas, George Seferis, Andreas Embirikos, George Sarandaris. Of all the deaths that happened, Karydis, his publisher at Ikaros, shook him up the most. Elytis had cordial relations with Yiannis Ritsos and close ties with his best friend Nikos Gatsos, both poets of the same generation.

=== Death ===
Odysseas Elytis had been completing plans to travel overseas to see friends when he died of heart failure in Athens on 18 March 1996, at the age of 84. He had made it known that he was a believer in cremation and had wished that somehow he could have been cremated, which the tenets of his Greek Orthodox religion do not support or allow. He was also a supporter of the legalization of euthanasia for people who wished to die after pain and suffering. Furthermore, he believed it was a woman's right to choose abortion in any circumstance.

In the last thirteen years of his life, he lived with a companion, Ioulita Iliopoulou, who was 53 years his junior. Iliopoulou is an activist for children throughout the world, imparting her knowledge whenever she is able to. She is a successful artist in her own right, translating and composing her own works and giving poetry recitals at the Theocharakis Foundation in Athens.

The funeral was held the next day after his death. The funeral was jammed with people who had loved his poetry. He was buried in a family grave beside his family, including his mother and brother.

Iliopoulou, as his life partner, inherited the immovable property in real estate of Elytis, which consisted of four apartments and the trustee power of copyrights to his work. She has been promoting Elytis with excellence in his legacy. Elytis was survived in his bloodline by his niece Myrsine (from his oldest brother Theodoros, born 1900) and his next in line older brother Evangelos. This brother (1909–2002) also received a writ of condolence from the mayor of Athens on behalf of the nation at the funeral at the First Cemetery of Athens.

== Poetry ==
"Greek the language they gave me; poor the house on Homer's shores."

— "To Axion Esti" (1959)

Elytis' poetry has marked, through an active presence of over forty years, a broad spectrum of subject matter and stylistic touch with an emphasis on the expression of that which is rarefied and passionate. He borrowed certain elements from Ancient Greece and Byzantium but devoted himself exclusively to today's Hellenism, of which he attempted—in a certain way based on psychical and sentimental aspects—to reconstruct a modernist mythology for the institutions. His main endeavour was to rid people's conscience from unjustifiable remorses and to complement natural elements through recourse to dreams as well as through ethical powers, in order to achieve the highest possible transparency in expression and finally, to succeed in approaching the mystery of light, the metaphysics of the sun of which Elytis was a "worshiper"-idolater by his own definition. A parallel manner concerning technique resulted in introducing the inner architecture, which is evident in a great many poems of his, mainly in the landmark work It Is Truly Meet (Το Άξιον Εστί). This work, due to its setting to music by Mikis Theodorakis as an oratorio, is a revered anthem whose verse is sung by all Greeks for all injustice, resistance and for its sheer beauty and musicality of form. Elytis' theoretical and philosophical ideas have been expressed in a series of essays under the title The Open Papers (Ανοιχτά Χαρτιά). Besides creating poetry, he applied himself to translating poetry and theatre as well as a series of collage pictures. Translations of his poetry have been published as autonomous books, in anthologies, or in periodicals in eleven languages.

== Works ==
=== Poetry ===
- Orientations (Προσανατολισμοί, 1939)
- Sun The First Together With Variations on A Sunbeam (Ηλιος ο πρώτος, παραλλαγές πάνω σε μιαν αχτίδα, 1943)
- An Heroic And Funeral Chant For The Lieutenant Lost In Albania (Άσμα ηρωικό και πένθιμο για τον χαμένο ανθυπολοχαγό της Αλβανίας, 1962)
- To Axion Esti—It Is Worthy (Το Άξιον Εστί, 1959)
- Six Plus One Remorses For The Sky (Έξη και μια τύψεις για τον ουρανό, 1960)
- The Light Tree And The Fourteenth Beauty (Το φωτόδεντρο και η δέκατη τέταρτη ομορφιά, 1972)
- The Sovereign Sun (Ο ήλιος ο ηλιάτορας, 1971)
- The Trills of Love (Τα Ρω του Έρωτα, 1973)
- Villa Natacha {published in Thessaloniki by Tram and dedicated to E Terade 1973]
- The Monogram (Το Μονόγραμμα, 1972)
- Step-Poems (Τα Ετεροθαλή, 1974)
- Signalbook (Σηματολόγιον, 1977)
- Maria Nefeli (Μαρία Νεφέλη, 1978)
- Three Poems under a Flag of Convenience (Τρία ποιήματα με σημαία ευκαιρίας 1982)
- Diary of an Invisible April (Ημερολόγιο ενός αθέατου Απριλίου, 1984)
- Krinagoras (Κριναγόρας, 1987)
- The Little Mariner (Ο Μικρός Ναυτίλος, 1988)
- The Elegies of Oxopetra (Τα Ελεγεία της Οξώπετρας, 1991)
- West of Sadness (Δυτικά της λύπης, 1995)

=== Prose, essays ===
- The True Face and Lyrical Bravery of Andreas Kalvos (Η Αληθινή φυσιογνωμία και η λυρική τόλμη του Ανδρέα Κάλβου, 1942)
- 2x7 e (collection of small essays) (2χ7 ε (συλλογή μικρών δοκιμίων))
- (Offering) My Cards To Sight (Ανοιχτά χαρτιά (συλλογή κειμένων), 1973)
- The Painter Theophilos (Ο ζωγράφος Θεόφιλος, 1973)
- The Magic Of Papadiamantis (Η μαγεία του Παπαδιαμάντη, 1975)
- Reference to Andreas Embeirikos (Αναφορά στον Ανδρέα Εμπειρίκο, 1977)
- Things Public and Private (Τα Δημόσια και τα Ιδιωτικά, 1990)
- Private Way (Ιδιωτική Οδός, 1990)
- Carte Blanche («Εν λευκώ» (συλλογή κειμένων), 1992)
- The Garden with the Illusions (Ο κήπος με τις αυταπάτες, 1995)
- Open Papers: Selected Essays (Copper Canyon Press, 1995) (translated by Olga Broumas and T. Begley)

=== Art books ===
- The Room with the Pictures (Το δωμάτιο με τις εικόνες, 1986) – collages by Odysseas Elytis, text by Evgenios Aranitsis

=== Translations ===
- Second Writing (Δεύτερη γραφή, 1976)
- Sappho (Σαπφώ)
- The Apocalypse (by John) (Η αποκάλυψη, 1985)

== Translations of Elytis' work ==
- Poesie. Procedute dal Canto eroico e funebre per il sottotenente caduto in Albania. Trad. Mario Vitti (Roma. Il Presente. 1952)
- 21 Poesie. Trad. Vicenzo Rotolo (Palermo. Istituto Siciliano di Studi Bizantini e Neoellenici. 1968)
- Poèmes. Trad. Robert Levesque (1945)
- Six plus un remords pourle ciel. Trad. F. B. Mache (Fata Morgana. Montpellier 1977)
- Körper des Sommers. Übers. Barbara Schlörb (St. Gallen 1960)
- Sieben nächtliche Siebenzeiler. Übers. Günter Dietz (Darmstadt 1966)
- To Axion Esti – Gepriesen sei. Übers. Günter Dietz (Hamburg 1969)
- The Axion Esti. Tr. E. Keeley and G. Savidis (Pittsburgh 1974 – Greek & English)(repr. London: Anvil Press, 1980 – English only)
- Lofwaardig is. Vert. Guido Demoen (Ghent 1989–1991)
- The Sovereign Sun: selected poems. Tr. K. Friar (1974; repr. 1990)
- Selected poems. Ed. E. Keeley and Ph. Sherrard (1981; repr. 1982, 1991)
- Maria Nephele, tr. A. Anagnostopoulos (1981)
- Çılgın Nar Ağacı, tr. C. Çapan (Istanbul: Adam Yayınları, 1983)
- What I love: selected poems, tr. O. Broumas (1986) [Greek & English texts]
- To Àxion Estí, tr. Rubén J. Montañés (Valencia: Alfons el Magnànim, 1992) [Catalan & Greek edition with notes]
- Eros, Eros, Eros, Selected & Last Poems, tr. Olga Broumas (Copper Canyon Press, 1998)
- The Collected Poems of Odysseus Elytis, tr. Jeffrey Carson & Nikos Sarris (The Johns Hopkins University Press, 1997, 2004)
- The Oxopetra Elegies and West of Sorrow, tr. David Connolly (Harvard University Press - 2014) (Greek & English texts)
