= Costas Evangelatos =

Greek poet and artist

- Born: Argostolion, Greece
- Occupations: Poet, painter

Costas Evangelatos (Greek: Κώστας Ευαγγελάτος) (born 1957) is a Greek artist and poet born in Argostoli, Greece. He studied law at Athens University and later pursued painting and aesthetic theory of modern art in Manhattan, New York City. From 1986 to 1993, he served as the artistic director of the DADA Gallery in Athens and in 1990, he founded the art group ART STUDIO "EST".

Evangelatos has worked internationally in various artistic disciplines such as Performance, Body art, Happening, and Mail art. He has held solo exhibitions in cities including Athens, Rochester, New York, Thessaloniki, Arezzo, Avignon, Chantilly, Paris, Glasgow, Amsterdam, and Nicosia. Additionally, he has participated in numerous group exhibitions and international artistic meetings in Barcelona, Warsaw, Seratz, Gothenburg, Amiens, Rome, Moscow, Santiago, Buenos Aires, New York, Los Angeles, and others.

Evangelatos has written books consisting of aesthetic essays and poems, published in seven editions by "APOPEIRA" editions. He has also given lectures on art both in Greece and abroad. He is a member of scientific and artistic organizations and holds senior membership in Greece's Chamber of Fine Arts.

His works can be found in various art collections, including the Art Institute of the Central Bank of Greece, the "Museum of the City of Athens," the Gallery of the School of Philosophy at the University of Athens, the "ART" – Macedonian Fine Art Company, the Gallery of the Company of Macedonian Studies, the Municipal Gallery of Athens, the American College of Greece (ACG ART COLLECTION), the Photographic Archive of the Benaki Museum, the headquarters of the Army Navy, the Foundation of Archbishop Makarios in Nicosia, the Patriarchate of Alexandria, the Reading Society of Corfu, the Ionian University, the Municipal Gallery of Corfu, the Greek Embassy in France, the Greek and Cypriot Consulate in Paris, and the Fordham University of New York, among others.

During his time in the United States, Evangelatos had his collection of emotional poems titled "Alea Prosomoion" translated into English by Kimon Friar. The translated poems were published in Greece under the title "In the small mirror" (2003) by APOPEIRA editions.

== Exhibitions ==
Date	Individual expo
1973–74	Argostoli City Hall, Cultural Center Ithaka, Greece
1977	Student Union E.M.P. University, Athens
1978	Reading Society of Corfu, Greece
1983	French Institute of Athens, Kalamata, Greece
1985	Fordham University at Lincoln Center, N.Y.
1988	Centre Culturel "Les Fontaines", Chantilly, France
1989	Art Studio, Cortona (Arezzo), Italy
1996	Opus 39 Gallery, Nicosia, Cyprus
1999	"Body-Concepts in Attic Light", paintings and photos, Gallery Gert-Jan Paridon, Amsterdam, the Netherlands
2001	"Body-Passion", Theater "Meli", Athens
2003	"Body-Graphics and Geometrical Areas", Alta Linea, Athens
2004	"Sea Images", Municipal Gallery of Ithaca, Ithaca, Greece
2005	"Figurations I", Center of Juridical Studies-K. Beys, Athens
2007	"Les Portraits et les Paysages Lettristes", Le Centre de Sèvres, Paris
2008	"Portraits et Torses Conceptuels", La Maison de la Grèce, Paris
2009	"Depictions", Art Space Exombourgo, Tinos, Greece
2010	"Conceptions et documents sous la lumière d'Attique", La Maison de la Grèce, Paris
