= Evgenios Aranitsis =

Greek poet, novelist and essayist (born 1955)

Evgenios Aranitsis (Greek: Ευγένιος Αρανίτσης; born 1955, Corfu) is a Greek poet, novelist and essayist.

In 1986, in collaboration with Odysseas Elytis, he published the lyrical album The Room with the Pictures. The collection Who Corfu Belongs to (1999) was awarded the State Literary Prize for the essay genre. Since 1978 he has been a columnist for Eleftherotypia. Since the early 1990s he has been working on a long and complex poetic composition entitled Morphology, sections of which have appeared in literary journals. In 2007, the journal Porfyras published a special issue on his work. In the same year, a French translation of his novel Details on the End of the World came out by Flammarion. From July 2014 he publishes a weekly column on the website paradoxa.gr.

== Works ==
- The Room with the Pictures, (Το δωμάτιο με τις εικόνες, 1986)
- Africa (Αφρική, 1988)
- Poems & Acts (Ποιήματα & Πράξεις, 1990)
- Details on the End of the World (Λεπτομέρειες για το τέλος του κόσμου, 1993)
- Stories liked by Some People I know (Ιστορίες που άρεσαν σε μερικούς ανθρώπους που ξέρω, 1995)
- Physics (Φυσική, 1995)
- The Sea (Η θάλασσα, 1998)
- Who Corfu Belongs to (Σε ποιον ανήκει η Κέρκυρα, 1999)
- Orphan Drugs (1999)
- Elytis for Children and Lovers (Ο Ελύτης για παιδιά και ερωτευμένους, 2000)
- Summer on the Hard Disc (Καλοκαίρι στον σκληρό δίσκο, 2002)
