= Galateia Kazantzakis =

Greek writer

Galateia Kazantzakis (née Alexiou; Greek: Γαλάτεια Καζαντζάκη [Αλεξίου]; 1884 – November 17, 1962) was a Greek novelist, poet, playwright, journalist, and activist. She is considered one of the most prolific female Greek Modernist writers.

== Biography ==
The writer and activist was born Galateia Alexiou (Greek: Γαλάτεια Αλεξίου) in Heraklion, on the Greek island of Crete, in 1884, although some sources give her birth year as 1881. Her father, Stylianos Alexiou, was a publisher and author, and her sister, Ellie Alexiou, also became a well-known writer.

Kazantzakis began her career as a journalist, with her first piece appearing in the Cretan publication Pinakothiki in 1906. She then began to publish translations from French, reviews, and short prose pieces in Pinakothiki and other publications such as the magazine Panathinea. In 1909, she published her first novella, Ridi, Pagliaccio ("Laugh, Clown"), in the journal Nouma. This was followed by various works including the 1915 lyric narrative Brief Prose Portraits, the 1927 short story collection 11 a.m. to 1 p.m., and, in 1933, her first novel, Women. She wrote under various pen names, including Lalo de Castro and Petroula Psiloriti.

From her earliest writing, Kazantzakis advocated for feminist empowerment and the dismantling of male-dominated social structures. She notably wrote in Demotic vernacular, the language of everyday people.

Kazantzakis became increasingly involved in left-wing politics and activism during the interwar years, identifying herself as both a feminist and a socialist. She served as editor in chief of the communist publication Protoporoi and then the Trotskyist-leaning Nea Epitheorisi. In her writing, she condemned women's sexual and labor exploitation. During World War II, she was active in the Greek resistance. She would be persecuted for her communism, losing her job at the Athens municipal library after the war over her views, but she was never exiled or imprisoned at length.

Critics argue her work has been undervalued in the shadow of her former husband Nikos Kazantzakis, a major figure in modern Greek literature known for such books as Zorba the Greek. After a year living together in Athens, in 1911, the couple married, despite the groom's father opposing the union. They would divorce in 1926. In 1933, she remarried Markos Avgeris, also a writer, whom she had known for decades, but she still published under her former husband's surname.

In her later years, Kazantzakis continued to produce fiction, including the short prose collection Turning Points (1952). Her last book, 1956's Humans and Superhumans, was a work of autobiographical fiction that dealt with her tumultuous relationship with her former husband. It is considered her best-known novel.

Kazantzakis was also a prolific playwright. In 1933, her play While the Ship Sails became particularly well known after it was performed by the National Theatre of Greece. Her collected plays, 17 in total, were published in 1957.

She died in 1962, after a motor accident in Athens.
