= Elli Alexiou =

Greek author, playwright and journalist

Elli Alexiou (Greek: Έλλη Αλεξίου; 22 May 1894 – 28 September 1988) was a Greek author, playwright and journalist.

== Biography ==
The daughter of a printer and publisher, Alexiou was born in Heraklion, Ottoman Crete. She taught French in a high school, and was politically active, joining the Communist Party in 1928 and working with the National Liberation Front resistance during World War II. After the war, she received a scholarship from the French government and studied in Paris. She was stripped of Greek citizenship in 1950, living as an exile until it was restored in 1965.

Alexiou wrote short stories and novels about her experience as a school teacher and her life as a political exile in Hungary and Romania. Her sister Galatea was the first wife of novelist Nikos Kazantzakis.

She died in Athens.

== Works ==
- Third Christian Girls School (1934)
- Lumpen (1940)
- Tributaries (1956)
- Bent on Greatness (1966)
- The Dominant (1972)
- Demolished Mansions (1977)
- Royal Oak (1983)
