= Michael K. Stefanidis =

Greek physicist & professor (1868–1957)

Michael Stefanidis
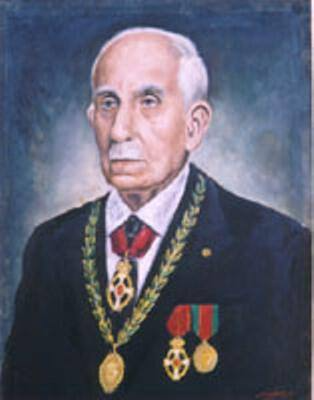
- Born: November 8, 1868; Mantamados, Lesvos
- Died: November 25, 1957 (aged 89); Athens, Greek
- Education: University of Athens
- Known for: History of Science Modern Greece
- Awards: Order of the George
- Scientific career
- Fields: Physics; History
- Workplaces: University of Athens; Academy of Athens

Michael K. Stefanidis (Greek: Μιχαήλ Κ. Στεφανίδης; November 8, 1868 -November 25, 1957) was a mathematician, physicist, chemist, natural scientist, author, and historian. He was the first chair of the History of Sciences department at the University of Athens and is the father of the history of modern Greek scientists. He accumulated a detailed history of Greek scientists affiliated with the National and Kapodistrian University of Athens from 1837 to 1937. His book Ιστορία της Φυσικομαθηματικής Σχολής του Πανεπιστημίου Αθηνών (History of the School of Physics and Mathematics of the University of Athens) is a detailed history of almost every scientist affiliated with the University of Athens since its inception, including Georgios Konstantinos Vouris, Nikolaos Ch. Nikolaidis, Cyparissos Stephanos, Dimitrios Stroumpos, and Theodoros G. Orphanides.

Michael was born in the village of Mantamados on the island of Lesbos. His father Konstantinos was a mathematician who motivated his son to follow a career in the sciences. By age 20, Michael attended the University of Athens and finished a degree in physics while also showing an interest in the history of science. He returned to the island of Lesbos where he worked for several years but traveled back to Athens where he lived out the rest of his life as an academic promoting the history of science. He spent most of his career at the University of Athens and later became a member of the Academy of Athens. He wrote many articles in the field of natural science, chemistry, and the history of science. One of the publications he wrote for was Prometheus (Προμηθέας).

He was a member of many international historical scientific societies and was well known in his field some included the History of Science Society, of the International Commission for Transliteration of Eastern Principal Names, of the International Commission for the Compilation of Chronological Tables (toward the Writing of the World History of the Sciences). He won an award from the Association Pour l'encouragement des etudes grecques. He also received several medals of the Order of the George. He died in Athens at 89 years of age.

== History ==
Michael was born in the village of Mantamados on the island of Lesvos and at the time it was still part of the Ottoman Empire. His father's name was Konstantinos and he was a math teacher initially at the School of Quintessence, in Asia Minor (modern-day Turkey) and then in Mytilene. Michael received his early education on the island of Lesvos and then migrated to Athens and was accepted at the School of Philosophy of the University of Athens from 1888 to 1892. He excelled at the university and by the age of 25, he was awarded a Doctorate of Philosophy degree in the field of natural science with special knowledge of chemistry from the institution in 1893. Around that period he was affiliated with the academic circles of Athens and frequently wrote for the publication Prometheus (Προμηθέας). Some of his professors included Spyridon Lambros, Konstantinos M. Mitsopoulos, Anastasios Christomanos, and Timoleon Argyropoulos.

In 1893, he was appointed a position at the chemical laboratory of Lesbos and taught at the local high school (gymnasio) on the same island by 1896. He taught natural science incorporating history in his lectures. He continued writing about science and philosophy in the publications Armonian of Smyrna, Athena magazine, and Syngramma Periodikon of the Athens Scientific Society. He returned to Athens where he published the translation of Les origines de l' Alchimie originally written by Marcellin Berthelot. Stefanidis' version was entitled The Genesis of Alchemy (Η Της Αλχημείας Γένεσις) and published in 1906. Two years later in 1908, he completed a dissertation entitled Saltworks and Juices (Ψαμμουργική και Χυμεία). In 1910, the School of Physics and Mathematics of the University of Athens appointed Stefanidis professor of the history of chemistry. The position was abolished in 1912 and Stefanidis traveled to Germany and France where he continued his studies in the field of the history of sciences.

In 1913, he contributed to a state historical dictionary entitled Historical Dictionary of Greek Language. His contribution was the interpretation of ancient terms relating to the natural sciences. Around the same period, he continued writing about the history of sciences. He was elected professor of the History of Natural Sciences at the University of Athens in 1919 when they reestablished his position and eventually became chair of that department until 1939. He specialized in the history of science. His most important contribution to the history of Greek science was the publication of History of the School of Physics and Mathematics of the University of Athens (Ιστορία της Φυσικομαθηματικής Σχολής του Πανεπιστημίου Αθηνών) which detailed nearly every scientist associated with the institution since its inception. The book featured a small biography of each scientist, a featured list of scientific publications for each professor and it also featured pictures of selected scientists at the end of the text. In 1938, he was elected a member of the Academy of Athens.

For his service, he was rewarded two gold medals for his valuable contribution to the history of science. King George II awarded him the golden cross of the Order of George I in 1936 and in 1950, he received the title of Knight Commander. He was the founding member of the History of Science Society in Athens and a member of the Comité Internationale d'Histoire des Sciences and German Society for the History of Medicine and Natural Sciences (Deutsche Gesellschaft für Geschichte der Med Und der Naturwissenschaften). He died in Athens on November 25, 1957. He was 89 years old.

== Publications ==
Books and articles authored by Michael K. Stefanidis
| Date | Title | Title in English |
|---|---|---|
| 1893 | Το Ύδωρ ως Γεωλογικός Παράγων υπό Χυμικήν Έποψιν (διατρ. Διδακτορ. 1893) | Water as a Geological Agent from a Chemical Point of View |
| 1896 | Η Ορυκτολογία του Θεοφράστου | The Mineralogy of Theophrastus |
| 1905 | Μαθήματα Γεν. Πειραματικής Χυμείας (Γυμνάσια) | General Experimental Chemistry (High School Textbook) |
| 1907 | Η της Αλχυμείας Γένεσις (μετάφρ. του συγγράμματος του M. Berthelot "Les origines de L' Alchimie") | Genesis of Alchemy (Greek translation of M. Berthelot's work "Les origines de L' Alchimie") |
| 1909 | Χημεία και Λέσβος | Chemistry and Lesvos |
| 1909 | Ψαμμουργική και Χυμεία | Saltworks and Juices |
| 1914 | Συμβολαί εις την ιστορίαν των Φυσικών Επιστημών και ιδίως της Χυμείας | Symbols in the History of the Natural Sciences and Especially of Chemistry |
| 1916 | Δημώδης Ονοματολογία | Popular Nomenclature |
| 1916 | Sur un Procede Colorimetrique, Utilise par les Grecs pour Caracteriser les Eaux Douces | Colorimetric Process, Used by the Greeks to Characterize Fresh Waters |
| 1918 | Ιστορικόν Λεξικόν της Ελληνικής Γλώσσης | Historical Dictionary of the Greek Language |
| 1918 | Le feu Gregeois ou le feu Liquide des Byzantins | Greek Fire or the Liquid fire of the Byzantines |
| 1920 | Περί της Αρχής και της Χρησιμότητος της Ιστορίας των Φυσικών Επιστημών | On the Principle and Usefulness of the History of Natural Sciences |
| 1921 | Inertie Polymorphe (Φιλοσοφική Θεωρία περί Καθολικής Αδρανείας) | Polymorphic Inertia (Philosophical Theory of Universal Inertia) |
| 1926 | Αι Φυσικαί Επιστήμαι εν Ελλάδι προ της Επαναστάσεως, η Εκπαιδευτική Επανάστασις | A Study of Physics in Greece before the Revolution, the Educational Revolution |
| 1932 | Λογοτεχνήματα | Literary works |
| 1937 | Εισαγωγή εις την Ιστορίαν των Φυσικών Επιστημών | Introduction to the History of Natural Sciences |
| 1940 | Histoire Naturelle des mots ou Naissance de la Langue et Prehistoire de L'empirisme par les Mots | Natural History of Words or Birth of Language and Prehistory of Empiricism Through Words |
| 1941 | Ορολογικά Δημώδη | Terminological Commons |
| 1943 | Πίναξ των Εμών Ερμηνειών και Διορθώσεων εις Αρχαίους Συγγραφείς | Table of my Ιnterpretations and Corrections in Ancient Authors |
| 1948 | Ιστορία της Φυσικομαθηματικής Σχολής του Πανεπιστημίου Αθηνών | History of the School of Physics and Mathematics of the University of Athens |

== Bibliography ==
- Katsiaboura, Gianna (May 6, 2023). "Ο Μιχαήλ Κ. Στεφανίδης ως Ιστορικός της Αλχημείας" [Michael K. Stefanidis as a Ηistorian of Αlchemy] (PDF) (in Greek). Athens, Greece: Historical Research Institute/EIE. Archived (PDF) from the original on May 6, 2023.
- Stefanidou, Micheal K. (1952). Εθνικόν και Καποδιστριακόν Πανεπιστήμιον Αθηνών Εκατονταετηρίς 1837-1937 Ιστορία της Φυσικομαθηματικής Σχολής [National and Kapodistrian University of Athens Centenary 1837-1937 History of the Faculty of Physics and Mathematics] (PDF). Athens, Greece: National and Kapodistrian University of Athens.
- Papamichael, Anna J (1975). Birth and Plant Symbolism Symbolic and Magical uses of Plants in Connection With Birth in Modern Greece. Athens, Greece: Athens Publishing.
- Savaidou, Irini Mergoupi (2010). Δημόσιος Λόγος περί Επιστήμης στην Ελλάδα, 1870–1900: Εκλαϊκευτικά Εγχειρήματα στο Πανεπιστήμιο Αθηνών, στους Πολιτιστικούς Συλλόγους και στα Περιοδικά [Public Discourse about Science in Greece, 1870-1900: Population Projects at the University of Athens, in Cultural Associations and Magazines] (PDF). Athens, GR: Department of History and Philosophy of Science of the University of Athens.
- Vlahakis, George (February 19, 2015). "Michael K. Stefanidis". Athens, Greece: Fractal H Geometria Ton Idean. Archived from the original on March 7, 2019.
