= Theodoros G. Orphanides =

Greek poet, politician and author

Theodoros Orphanides
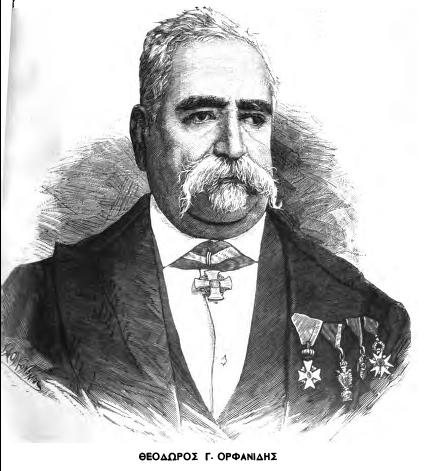
- Born: 1817; Smyrna, Ottoman Empire
- Died: 5 August 1886 (aged 68–69); Athens, Greece
- Education: University of Paris; National Museum of Natural History, France
- Known for: Botanical classification
- Scientific career
- Fields: Botany; Plant taxonomy Scientific classification
- Workplaces: University of Athens
- Doctoral advisors: Adolphe-Théodore Brongniart
- Author abbrev. (botany): Orph

Theodoros Orphanides or Orphanidis (Greek: Θεόδωρος Ορφανίδης; 1817 – 5 August 1886) was a poet, professor, politician, author, and botanist. He was a pioneer in 19th-century Greek botany. He helped organize the botanical garden in Greece. The genus Orphanidesia is named after him. He collected 3483 specimens from 21 countries and identified 413 specimens from 9 countries. He was a Professor of Botany at the National and Kapodistrian University of Athens. He was one of the leading representatives of the First Athenian School. He received the Ralio award three times.

== Early life ==
He was born in Smyrna (now İzmir), but his parents were from Chios, Greece. He was from a prominent wealthy family. His older brother was Dimitris Orphanides. He was a world-renowned doctor. His nephew was Greek Olympian Georgios Orphanidis. After the outburst of the Greek Revolution, his family was forced to move to Nafplio and later Tinos. They finally settled on the island of Syros. He finished high school on the island of Syros. In 1835, at the age of 18, he moved to Athens. He was appointed ministerial scribe for the Ministry of Interior. While he lived in Athens he began to show an interest in writing political satire. Regrettably, because he was constantly criticizing the King of Greece in his political satire he was fired from the ministry and was sentenced to 3 days in jail. He published two poems with the title Menippus in 1836–1837. Four years later he was writing for the satirical newspaper (Archer) Τοξότης. In 1842, he wrote a poem entitled The First Martyr Rigas and the Greek Revolution (Ο Πρωτομάρτυς Ρήγας και η Ελληνική Επανάστασις). In 1844, at the age of 27 after the personal intervention of the Greek Prime Minister Ioannis Kolettis. Theodore was sent to France on a scholarship from the Greek government. He studied at the prestigious botanical garden of the National Museum of Natural History it was converted into a special academic research facility after the French Revolution. The institution was part of the University of Paris and Sorbonne University system. The facility had one of largest botanical gardens in the world at the time. It housed the Royal Garden of Medicinal Plants created by King Louis XIII in 1635. Theodoro's professors at the institution were Adrien-Henri de Jussieu, Adolphe-Théodore Brongniart, Joseph Decaisne and Achille Richard.

== Academic career ==
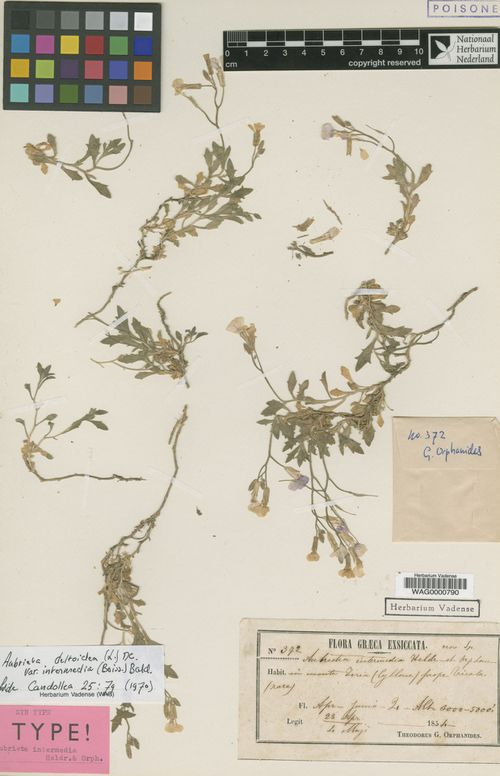
Example of Theodore's Plant Collection

When he returned to Athens on August 11, 1850, he was appointed Professor of Botany at the National and Kapodistrian University of Athens. Four years later in 1854, he was awarded full Professor status. He maintained his position for over thirty years. The university was very political in nature. College professors usually participated in political debates and issues. Dimitrios Stroumpos and Ioannis Papadakis were some of the other professors dragged into Greece's political issues. The university faculty and government created an alliance that led to the departure of world-renowned astronomer Georgios Konstantinos Vouris. Vouris was Greek-Austrian. He was from the same country as the King of Greece. During the years 1867 – 1868 Orphanides was Rector of the University. He was tirelessly collecting floral species from all over Greece. Theodore pressed the plants using a plant press and prepared them for classification. Specimens were prepared and glued to archival-quality card stock with their labels. Labels were made with special ink and attached with archival-quality glue. Theodore prepared countless plant specimens. The dried plants were added to his herbarium some were sent to botanists all over the world. His plant material formed a remarkable Herbarium with over 45,000 specimens. He traveled across Greece studying plant diversity. He published his findings in an exsiccata work entitled Flora Graeca Exsiccata. Theodore was also the superintendent of the botanical garden and the state arboretum, he introduced ornamental plants and he was actively involved in the design and creation of urban public parks. He oversaw the creation of the National Garden of Athens. Theodore frequently collaborated with world-renowned botanists some included Theodor von Heldreich and Pierre Edmond Boissier. When he died his Herbarium was purchased by national benefactor Theodoros Rodokanakis. Rodokanakis donated the collection to the Botanical Museum of the University. After his death in 1886, Theodor von Heldreich distributed an exsiccata-like specimen series under the title "Reliquiae Orphanideae curante Th. de Heldreich anno 188. emissae".

== Rector's speech ==
When Theodore became rector of the University of Athens he gave a notable speech on November 26, 1867. He discussed Greek vegetation and the classification and nomenclature of Greek flora. The speech was over 75 pages. Thirty pages of the speech were taxonomic tables where the classes, orders, and species of the Greek flora were described. Forty-five pages included the scientific clarification of botany. He was concerned with enriching the school's museum with botanical species. He was also concerned that students showed little interest in the natural sciences. He also discussed the need for a Greek botanical journal to communicate with Europe. He eventually started his own journal several years after his speech in 1872 entitled Γεωπονικά Geoponika. He noted that most of his work from touring the Greek countryside was used by world-renowned Swiss botanist Pierre Edmond Boissier in his publication. The publication gave prestige and recognition to Theodore's work. Theodore explained that Theophrastus was the father of botany but he also made reference to the modern advancements of Georges Cuvier and Carl Linnaeus. He wanted Greece to follow the European path of botanical studies. He also wanted to modernize his department.

== Eponymy ==
The plant species Heracleum orphanidis, Centaurea orphanidea, Biebersteinia orphanidis, Campanula orphanidea, Euphorbia orphanidis, Nepeta orphanidea, Tulipa orphanidea, Verbascum orphanideum and Viola orphanidis are named after him.

== Literary works ==
Books and Articles authored by Theodoros Georgios Orphanides
Date	Title	Title in English
1836	Ο Μένιππος·Ποιήσεις Α	The Poems Menippus A
1837	Ο Μένιππος· Ποιήσεις Β	The Poems Menippus B
1841	Ο Τοξότης ( Έμμετρη Σατιρική Εφημερίδα)	The Archer (Published in the Emmetrical Satirical Newspaper)
1842	Ο Πρωτομάρτυς Ρήγας και η Ελληνική Επανάστασις	The First Martyr Rigas and the Greek Revolution
1850	Ankuendigung Flora Graeca Exsiccata	Identification of Dried Greek Flora
1854	Ο Άπατρις (αποσπάσματα)	Apatris (excerpts)
1855	Η Πόλις των Αθηνών	The City of Athens
1858	Τίρι Λίρι Ή Το Κυνηγέσιον Εν τη Νήσω Σύρω, Ποίημα Ηρωικοκωμικόν Εις Μέρη Επτά	Tiri Leery Or The Hunt In The Isles Of Syros, A Heroic-Comedian Poem In Seven Parts
1858	Χίος Δούλη Ποίημα Επικόν εις Άσματα Πέντε	Slave of Chios Epic Poem in Five Parts
1858	Άννα και Φλώρος Ή Ο Πύργος της Πέτρας	Anna and Floros Or The Tower of Stone
1858	Ο Ιώτας	Iotas
1859	Ποιήσεις Α	Poems A
1860	Άγιος Μηνάς (επεισόδιον της ελλην.επαναστάσεως) and Ποίημα λυρικο – επικόν υπό Θεοδώρου Ξένου	Agios Minas (Episode of the Greek Revolution) and Epic Lyrical poem by Theodoros Xenos
1877	Catalogus Systematicus Herbarii Theodori G. Orphanidis Professoris Botanices Nunc Munificentia Clarissimi Theodori P. Rhodocanakis in Museo Botanico Universitatis Athenarum	The Systematic Catalog of the Herbarium of Theodore G. Orphanidis, Professor of Botany Now the Munificence of the Most Famous Theodorus P. Rhodocanakis in the Botanical Museum of the University of Athens
1916	Τα Άπαντα · Μετά βιογραφικού Προλόγου υπό Ιω. Ζερβού	Ta Apata After a biographical Prologue by Io. Zervos

== See also ==
- Heinrich Moritz Willkomm
- Galanthus reginae-olgae
- Aristotle's biology
- Karl Nikolas Fraas
- Theodor von Heldreich

== Bibliography ==
- Savaidou, Irini Mergoupi (2010). 'Δημόσιος Λόγος περί Επιστήμης στην Ελλάδα, 1870–1900: Εκλαϊκευτικά Εγχειρήματα στο Πανεπιστήμιο Αθηνών, στους Πολιτιστικούς Συλλόγους και στα Περιοδικά [Public Discourse about Science in Greece, 1870-1900: Population Projects at the University of Athens, in Cultural Associations and Magazines] (PDF). Athens, GR: Department of History and Philosophy of Science of the University of Athens.
- Tampakis, Costas (2013). Sciences and religion: Their interaction in the borders of Europe (1832-1915) (PDF). Athens, GR: Colloque International, Europe et Sciences Modernes, Histoire d’un Engendrement Mutuel, Nantes, 21-22/2/2013.
- Johnson, A. T.; Smith, H.A; Stockdale, A. (2019). Plant Names Simplified: Their Pronunciation, Derivation and Meaning (3rd ed.). Sheffield, UK: 5m Publishing. ISBN 9781912178810.
- Harland, Gail (2016). Snowdrop. London, UK: Reaktion Books. ISBN 9781780236285.
- Sakellaropoulos, Meletios ( (1898). Εκκλησιαστικόν δίκαιον των Ανατολίκων Ορθοδόξου Εκκλησιάς [Ecclesiastical Archives of the Eastern Orthodox Church]. Athens, Gr: Saliveroy Press.
- Stefanidou, Micheal K. (1952). Εθνικόν και Καποδιστριακόν Πανεπιστήμιον Αθηνών Εκατονταετηρίς 1837-1937 Ιστορία της Φυσικομαθηματικής Σχολής [National and Kapodistrian University of Athens Centenary 1837-1937 History of the Faculty of Physics and Mathematics] (PDF). Athens, Greece: National and Kapodistrian University of Athens.

Catrgory:Greek poets
