= Stamatios D. Krinos =

Greek pharmacist and university professor

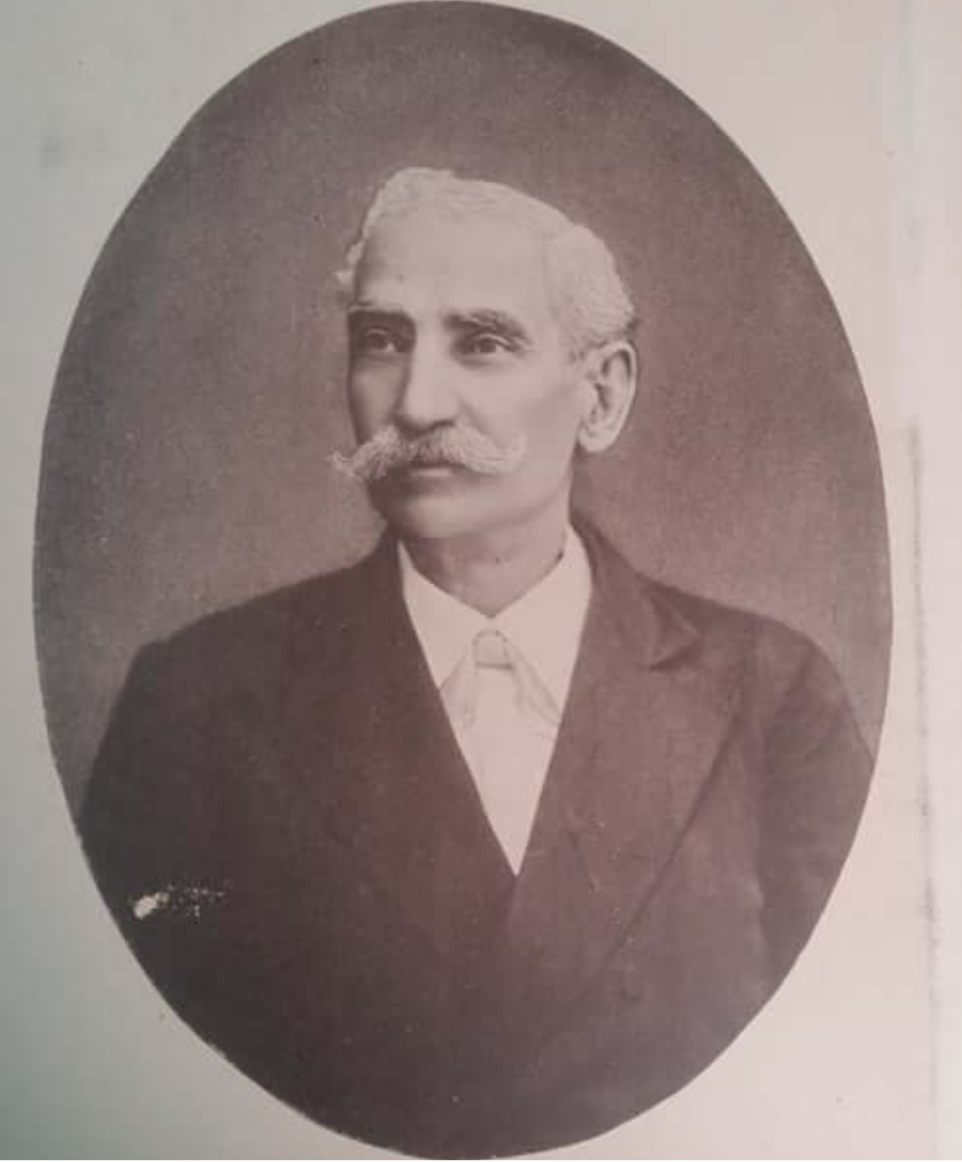
- Born: 1815; Constantinople, Ottoman Empire (now Istanbul, Turkey)
- Died: January 25, 1886 (aged 70–71); Athens, Greece
- Education: University of Paris; University of Pisa
- Spouse: Victoria Zenevraki
- Children: Maria; Athanasios
- Relatives: George A. Krinos
- Scientific career
- Fields: Chemistry; Pharmacology; Medicine
- Workplaces: University of Athens
- Doctoral advisors: Xaver Landerer
- Notable students: Anastasios Damvergis

Stamatios D. Krinos (Greek: Σταμάτιος Δ. Κρίνος; 1815 - January 25, 1886) was an author, chemist, pharmacist, botanist, and professor. He was one of the first Greek pharmacists to study pharmacology under Xaver Landerer and Alexandros Venizelos before the founding of the University of Athens. He opened one of the first pharmacies in Greece. He influenced Greek pharmacology in the 19th century during the Modern Scientific revolution. He did extensive research on Storax and wrote about the natural resin. He published a pharmaceutical magazine known as Asklepios in the late 1850s.

Stamatios was born in Constantinople. He traveled to Athens in his early twenties to study pharmacology. He was influenced by his brother Athanasios who was also a pharmacist. After his studies, he briefly opened a pharmacy in Athens. Stamatios wanted to become a professor at the newly founded university. He traveled to Pisa, Italy for two years and studied botany and other disciplines related to pharmacology at the University of Pisa. He also traveled to Paris and studied at the University of Paris from 1843-1846. Georgios Zavitsanos followed in his footsteps. Zavitsanos also studied pharmacology at the University of Paris in the 1850s. By 1846, Krinos was back in Greece and became a professor at the University of Athens. He helped organize Greek pharmacology with Xaver Landerer and Georgios Zavitsanos. He was a member of the Medical Congress, National Industry Committee, sisterhood of the hospital philanthropy Elpis, and the Central Committee for the Universal Exhibition. He published a useful book on the scientific identification of ancient Greek plants through the names of the people in places and times and their usefulness in the etymology and lexicography of the Greek language. He died on January 25, 1896, in Athens he was about 71 years old.

== History ==
Krinos was born in Constantinople in 1815. He attended grade school in the city. In 1829, at the age of fourteen, he migrated to the island of Syros. His brother Athanasios ran a private pharmacy on the island for five years. While he was on the island Krinos was taught philosophy by Neophytos Vamvas and ancient Greek by Economides Pezaros. Vambas also taught Konstantinos Negris. In 1835, Krinos traveled to Athens and attended the pharmaceutical school. He was one of the first students to attend the program created by Xaver Landerer and Alexandros Venizelos. Krinos passed the exams of the Medical Council, and received a degree in pharmacology. The University of Athens was founded the same year he opened his first pharmacy in Athens. The year was 1837 and the pharmacy bore his name. The Pharmaceutical School eventually became part of the University of Athens. He eventually decided to travel to Western Europe to enhance his knowledge in the field of pharmaceutical science to teach the discipline.

By the year 1841, he was a student at the University of Pisa. He attended the institution for two years. He studied botany and chemistry. Italian schools did not offer Dottorato di ricerca (doctoral degrees) until 1927. He eventually migrated to France. He stayed in France for three years attending the University of Paris for advanced studies in pharmacology. He completed his studies in 1846. Krinos returned to Greece and became a professor of Organic Chemistry at the University of Athens. He published the magazine Asklepios from 1856-1859. He eventually married Victoria Zenevraki. They had two children Athanasios and Maria. His son Athanasios and nephew George A. Krinos also became notable pharmacists. His daughter Maria married a military doctor named Panagiotis Diamantopoulos. By 1861, he was teaching pharmacology at the School of Medicine. He also taught at the School of Arts. In 1869, he replaced his mentor Landerer as the head of the department.

In 1879, the Athens Pharmaceutical Society was founded. The society featured a monthly journal on pharmacology. The first president of the society was Krinos, and his mentor, Landerer, was the honorary president of the society. Other members of the society were Georgios Zavitsanos, Anastasios Christomanos, Timoleon Argyropoulos, Anastasios Damvergis, Spyridon Miliarakis and Theodor von Heldreich. He was also a member of the Medical Congress from 1853 to 1886, the sisterhood of hospital philanthropy Elpis (1854-1858, 1863), a Greek judge of the Encouragement of the National Industry Committee (1858, 1863, 1865) and a member of the Central Committee for the Universal Exhibition (1862).

== Literary works ==
Books and Articles authored by Stamatios D. Krinos
Date	Title	Title in English
1856-59	Ασκληπιό	Asklepios Magazine
1862	Περί Στύρακος, Διατριβή Φαρμακογραφική	A Study of Storax
1880	Έλεγχος της βοτανικής των Νεωτέρων Ελλήνων του Βερνάρδου Λαγκάβελ	A Study of Modern Greek Botany (Publication of Bernard Lagavel)
1882	Περί Επιστημονικού Προσδιορισμού των Αρχαίων Ελληνικών Φυτών (Δελτίον της Εστίας (1877-1892))	On the Scientific Identification of Ancient Greek Plants (Estias Magazine)

== Bibliography ==
- Stefanidis, Michail K. (1952). Εθνικόν και Καποδιστριακόν Πανεπιστήμιον Αθηνών Εκατονταετηρίς 1837-1937. Τόμος Ε′, Ιστορία της Φυσικομαθηματικής Σχολής [National and Kapodistrian University of Athens Centenary 1837-1937. Volume V, History of the Faculty of Physics and Mathematics] (PDF). Athens: National and Kapodistrian University of Athens.
- Savaidou, Irini Mergoupi (2010). Δημόσιος Λόγος περί Επιστήμης στην Ελλάδα, 1870–1900: Εκλαϊκευτικά Εγχειρήματα στο Πανεπιστήμιο Αθηνών, στους Πολιτιστικούς Συλλόγους και στα Περιοδικά [Public Discourse about Science in Greece, 1870-1900: Population Projects at the University of Athens, in Cultural Associations and Magazines] (PDF). Athens: Department of History and Philosophy of Science of the University of Athens.
- Vlahakis, George N.; Economou-Amilli, Athina (2012). Botany in Greece During the 19th Century: A Periphery at the Center. Istanbul, Turkey: Osmanlı Bilimi Araştırmaları XIII/2.
- Procter, William (1863). The American Journal of Pharmacy Volume 35, Third Series, Volume 11. Philadelphia, PA: Philadelphia College of Pharmacy.
