= Stefanidis =

Stefanidis, Stephanidis, female: Stefanidi, Stephanidi is a Greek surname. Notable people with the surname include:

- Babis Stefanidis (born 1981), Greek–Swedish footballer and manager
- Christoforos Stefanidis (born 1980), Greek basketball player
- John Stefanidis, British interior designer
- Katerina Stefanidi (born 1990), Greek pole vaulter
- Lazaros Stefanidis (born 1957), Greek para-athlete
- Markos Stefanidis (born 1967), Greek football manager
- Michael K. Stefanidis
- Miltos Stefanidis (born 1995), Greek footballer
- Mimis Stefanidis
- Nestoras Stefanidis (born 1984), Greek footballer

== Fictional characters ==
- Effie Stephanidis
