= Xaver Landerer =

Greek pharmacist and university professor

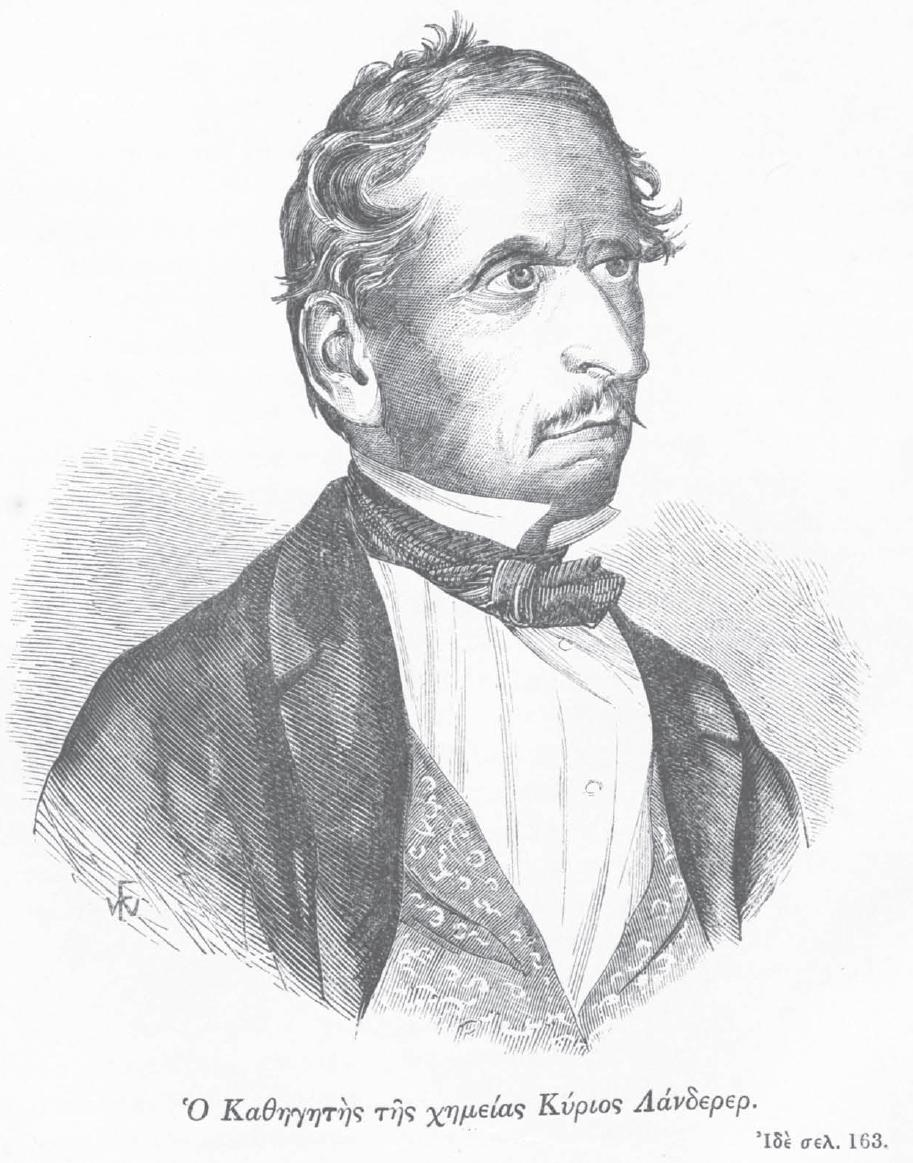
- Born: 9 September 1809; Munich, Kingdom of Bavaria (now Germany)
- Died: July 7, 1885 (aged 75); Athens, Greece
- Citizenship: German (1809-1885); Greek (1835-1885)
- Education: Ludwig-Maximilians-Universität München
- Spouse: Euphrosyne
- Children: Amalia Landerer-Averoff; Sophia Kanellopoulos; Iphigenia Vassileiadi
- Scientific career
- Fields: Chemistry; Pharmacology; Medicine
- Workplaces: University of Athens; Athens Polytechnic University; Court of King Othon

Xaver Landerer (9 September 1809 – 7 July 1885; Greek: Ξάβερ Λάντερερ) was a writer, medical doctor, physicist, chemist, pharmacist, botanist, and professor. He was the pharmacist to the first king of Greece Óthon. He wrote numerous books about chemistry and pharmacology during the modern scientific revolution. He was the first chemistry professor in Greece along with Alexander Venizelos. He helped organize Greek higher education. He established the first laboratory for pharmaceuticals in Greece. He influenced Anastassios Christomanos, Anastasios Damvergis and Dimitris Orphanides.

He was born in Munich. He studied pharmacology with Johann Andreas Buchner at the Ludwig-Maximilians-Universität München. He also wrote articles for his publication Buchner's Repertorium later in life. Landerer was an exceptional student and pharmacist. He was selected as the pharmacist to the first king of Greece. Landerer moved to Greece and remained in the country for the next 54 years of his life. He wrote numerous books in the field of chemistry. He was the dean of the Philosophical School of the University of Athens twice. The University of Athens was established following the German model. Landerer was a foreigner that adopted Greece as his new home. He fought to build up its educational system and include the new nation in the rapidly evolving European scientific community. He contributed to the fields of inorganic, analytical, medicinal, and pharmaceutical chemistry. He also wrote many books on the hot springs of Greece.

== Biography ==
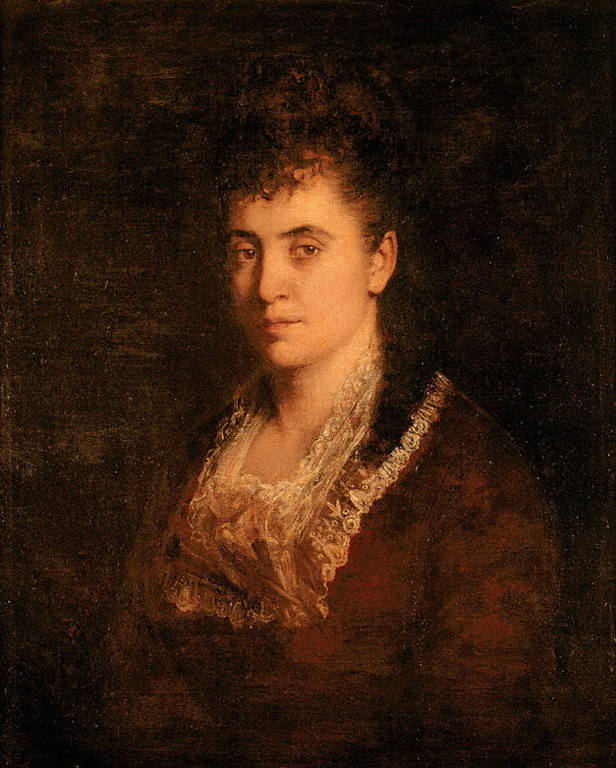
Landerer's daughter Amalia Landerer-Averoff

He was born in Munich in 1809. He studied at the Ludwig-Maximilians-Universität München from 1831 until 1832. He studied pharmacology. One of his professors was Johann Andreas Buchner. Landerer eventually married Euphrosyne. The couple had four daughters; three of their names were Sophia, Iphigenia, and Amalia. All his sons died at a young age. In 1832, the Kingdom of Greece was established. Landerer became one of the pharmacists of the new King. By age 26, Landerer became a citizen of the newly founded Kingdom because of the Greek Nationality Act of 1835. Between 1834 and 1835, Landerer doctor Ioannis Vouros and the director of the Royal Pharmacy Josef Sartori formed a special committee to assemble a pharmacopoeia for the country.

Characteristic of the pharmaceutical drugs available at the time, the book was published in 1837 in Greek and Latin, entitled Greek Pharmacopoeia (Ελληνική Φαρμακοποιΐα), the first official pharmacopoeia in the country, approved by royal decree the same year.

That same year he became one of the first professors at the newly founded University of Athens. He taught physics, chemistry, and pharmacology. He was the first professor of chemistry in Greece. He helped organize the newly founded university along with Konstantinos Negris and Dimitrios Stroumpos. Landerer continued writing. He wrote articles for Buchner's Repertorium a German pharmacological journal founded by his professor Johann Andreas Buchner. Landerer also did extensive research on the hot springs of Greece. He was also a notable botanist. Greek mathematician Ioannis Papadakis also decided to study at the Ludwig-Maximilians-Universität München around 1836.

By September 1843, the people were unhappy with the foreign monarch chosen to lead the new country. They led a rebellion called the Revolution of September 3, 1843. The people obtained a constitutional monarchy. Regrettably, all the foreign professors were expelled from the university in favor of Greek professors. Landerer, Karl Nikolas Fraas, Friedrich Zentner, Charles Laurent, Christian Hansen, Konstantinos Negris, and Theophil Hansen were all expelled. Within one year most of the faculty were rehired. Landerer also became a professor at the Athens Polytechnic University. He continued teaching physics, chemistry, and pharmacology. He also began teaching botany. He taught at two universities and was the royal pharmacist. He also conducted scientific research and continued publishing books worldwide. Landerer helped revive the first modern Olympic Games known as the Zappas Olympics. They were held in 1859, 1870, and 1875 in Athens, Greece. Landerer was the dean of the philosophical school twice (1846–1847 and 1854–1855). He also founded the first Laboratory of Pharmaceutical Chemistry in Greece. He was a member of the Medical Congress. He retired in 1869 after twenty-five years of service, he was sixty years old. His student Stamatios D. Krinos replaced him. Landerer was officially appointed professor emeritus in 1875. He continued writing, conducting research, and occasionally teaching classes until he died at 76 years old in Athens on July 7, 1885.

== Landerer's Pharmaceutical Education ==
During Landerer's time, the term apothecary was also used to refer to the pharmacist. The pharmacist candidate had to finish a high school degree. Pharmacists educated at the University of Athens were required to attend courses in analytical chemistry, physics, mineralogy, zoology, pharmacology, natural history, botany, and the art of prescription. Students also had to take lessons in history, mathematics, and philosophy. The theoretical education of pharmacists lasted three years. After three years the candidate took a written and oral exam. Finally, students were required to finish one year of work at a pharmacy for their practical skills. Landerer also wrote several books for his program. The program was superior to its German counterpart and any other programs offered in Europe.

== Children ==
The couple had four daughters. Three of their names were Iphigenia, Amalia, and Sophia. His daughters became very important members of the community. Amalia was born in 1847. She married into the prestigious Averoff family. Her husband was a member of the Greek parliament. His name was Michael A. Averoff (1840–1899). He was the son of Avyerinos Averoff. She took on the name Amalia Landerer-Averoff. A notable portrait was painted of her by famous Greek painter Ioannis Doukas around 1879. Landerer's other daughter Sophia married Charalambos Kanellopoulos. Their son was Efthimios Kanellopoulos. Landerer's grandson Efthimios became Minister of National Economy and Foreign Affairs. He was awarded the Silver and Gold Cross of the Savior (1908,1915). Iphigenia married into the Vassileiadi family.

== Literary works ==
Books and Articles authored by Xaver Landerer
Date	Title	Title in English
1835	Περί των εν Κύθνω θερμών Υδάτων	The Hot Springs in Kythnos
1835	Περί των εν Μήλο Θερμών Υδάτων	The Hot Springs in Mylos
1835	Περί των εν Σαντορήνη Θερμών Υδάτων	The Hot Springs in Santorini
1837	Ελληνική Φαρμακοποιΐα κατά Βασιλικήν Διαταγήν και κατ’ Έγκρισιν του Β. Ιατρικού Συμβουλίου	Greek Pharmacopoeia by Royal Decree with the Αpproval of the Second Medical Council
1837	Περί των εν Υπάτη θερμών Yδάτων	The Hot Springs in Ypati
1837	Die Heilquellen in Griechenland, Beschreibung Der Heilquellen von Patradgik, Aidipso Und Den Thermopylen	Description Of The Healing Springs of Thermopylae
1840	Περί των της Ελλάδος Ιαματικών Υδάτων	The Thermal Springs of Greece
1840	Χημεία των Ανοργανικών Σωμάτων Χημεία	The Chemistry of Inorganic Substances
1842	Στοιχεία της Αναλυτικής Χημείας	Elements of Analytical Chemistry
1842	Χημεία	Chemistry
1843	Τοξικολογία Εγχειρίδιον διά Ιατρούς, Φαρμακοποιούς, Δικαστικούς και Αστυνομικούς Υπαλλήλους	Toxicology Manual for Doctors, Pharmacists, Judicial and Police Officers
1845	Εγχειρίδιον της Φαρμακολογίας	Handbook of Pharmacology
1846	Εγχειρίδιον Συνταγολογίας Ήτοι Διδασκαλία της Σύνθεσης των Ιατρικών Συνταγών	Manual for Teaching Medical Prescriptions
1859	Der Königliche Hofgarten in Athen	The Royal Court Garden in Athens (Austrian Botanical Journal)
1866	Περί Αδαμάντων	Diamonds
1871	Περί Γάλακτος εν Είδει Πλακούντων	Placental Milk Transfer
1871	Περί των της Ελλάδος Σιδηρούχων Ορυκτών	The Ferrous Minerals of Greece

== See also ==
- Ernst Ziller
- Johann Friedrich Julius Schmidt
- Karl Nikolas Fraas
- Theodor von Heldreich

== Bibliography ==
- Freninger, Franz Xaver (1872). Das Matrikelbuch der Universitaet Ingolstadt-Landshut-München [The Matriculation book of the University of Ingolstadt-Landshut-Munich]. Munich, Germany: Druck and Verlag Publishing.
- Volkert, Klaus; Menghini, Marta; Barbin, Évelyne (2019). Descriptive Geometry, The Spread of a Polytechnic Art The Legacy of Gaspard Monge. Cham, Switzerland: Springer International Publishing. ISBN 9783030148089.
- Maisch, John M. (1885). The American Journal of Pharmacy Volume 57 Fourth Series, Volume 15. Philadelphia, PA: Philadelphia College of Pharmacy.
- Castle, Fred'k A.; Rice, Charles (1879). New Remedies An Illustrated Monthly Trade Journal of Materia Medica, Pharmacy and Therapeutics Volume 8. New York, N.Y.: William Wood & Company.
- Hanbury, Daniel (1876). Science Papers Chiefly Pharmacological and Botanical. London U.K.: Macmillan and Co.
- Kostidi, Melpomeni (2016). The Medical Discourse on Greek Spas from the Mid-Nineteenth Century to the Early Twentieth Century (PDF). London U.K.: Postgraduate Journal of Medical Humanities.
- Vlahakis, George N.; Economou-Amilli, Athina (2012). Botany in Greece During the 19th Century: A Periphery at the Center. Istanbul, Turkey: Osmanlı Bilimi Araştırmaları XIII/2.
- Ricks, David; Beaton, Roderick (2016). The Making of Modern Greece Nationalism, Romanticism, and the Uses of the Past (1797–1896). Burlington, VT: Ashgate Publishing Limited. ISBN 9781317024729.
- Stefanidou, Micheal K. (1952). Εθνικόν και Καποδιστριακόν Πανεπιστήμιον Αθηνών Εκατονταετηρίς 1837-1937 Ιστορία της Φυσικομαθηματικής Σχολής [National and Kapodistrian University of Athens Centenary 1837-1937 History of the Faculty of Physics and Mathematics] (PDF). Athens, Greece: National and Kapodistrian University of Athens.
- Balanos, Simos K. (1894). Εφημερίς της Ἑλληνικης καί Γαλλικης Νομολογίας [Journal of Greek and French Jurisprudence]. Parnassus, GR: Center for Modern Greek Studies, National Research Foundation.
