= Theodoros Negris =

Greek politician

Theodoros Negris (Greek: Θεόδωρος Νέγρης, Constantinople, c. 1790 – Nafplio, 22 November 1824) was a Greek politician.

== Biography ==
He was born in Constantinople. He was from an old noble family that descended from Genoa. His father was George Negris. His cousins Alexander Negris and Konstantinos Negris also participated in the Greek war of Independence. Both became prominent university professors. The family's wealth allowed Theodoros to receive a good education. In 1818 he was initiated into Filiki Eteria (Society of Friends) and became one of its most active members. He served as secretary to the hospodar of Moldavia Scarlat Callimachi, and in early 1821 he was appointed Ottoman envoy to Paris. On his way, however, he received news on the outbreak of the Greek War of Independence, and went secretly to Greece. Following the massacre against the Greek population in Constantinople, his father was beheaded by the Ottomans.

Negris arrived on the island of Spetses in Ottoman dress, and was almost lynched by the crowd, but was saved by Neofytos Vamvas. His cousin Konstantinos Negris became his student. Theodoros joined fellow Phanariotes Alexandros Mavrokordatos and Kostakis Karatzas. On 19 November 1821, he participated in the establishment of the Areopagus of Eastern Continental Greece, becoming its first president.

He took part in the First National Assembly at Epidaurus and the Second National Assembly at Astros, after which he switched camps and allied with Theodoros Kolokotronis and Odysseas Androutsos against Mavrokordatos. As the power of the Areopagus declined in favour of the central provisional government, so Negris too began to be sidelined and lose his influence.

He died on 22 November 1824 of typhus in Nafplio.

== Bibliography ==
- Αγαπητός Σ. Αγαπητός (1877). Οι Ένδοξοι Έλληνες του 1821, ή Οι Πρωταγωνισταί της Ελλάδος. Τυπογραφείον Α. Σ. Αγαπητού, Εν Πάτραις. pp. 216–221.
