= Josef Sartori =

German pharmacist and botanist

Josef Sartori (30 June 1809 – 15 September 1880) was a German pharmacist and botanist.

Sartori was born in Munich. In 1833, he came to Greece as court pharmacist to Otto of Greece. During his time in Greece, he conducted research on the flora of the country. In 1834, he accompanied Christian Leopold von Buch on his tour of Greece. In 1837, he sent notes on his biological observations to his professors Carl Friedrich Philipp von Martius and Joseph Gerhard Zuccarini in Munich; however, this material remained unpublished. He also shared his observations with his friend Theodor von Heldreich and following his example, from 1844, sent samples to Pierre Edmond Boissier. In 1837, along with Xaver Landerer and Ioannis Vouros, he published the first Greek Pharmacopoeia. After Otto's overthrow, Sartori returned to Munich in autumn 1862.

The standard author abbreviation Sartori is used to indicate this person as the author when citing a botanical name.
