= Hans Max Jahn =

German physical chemist (1853–1906)

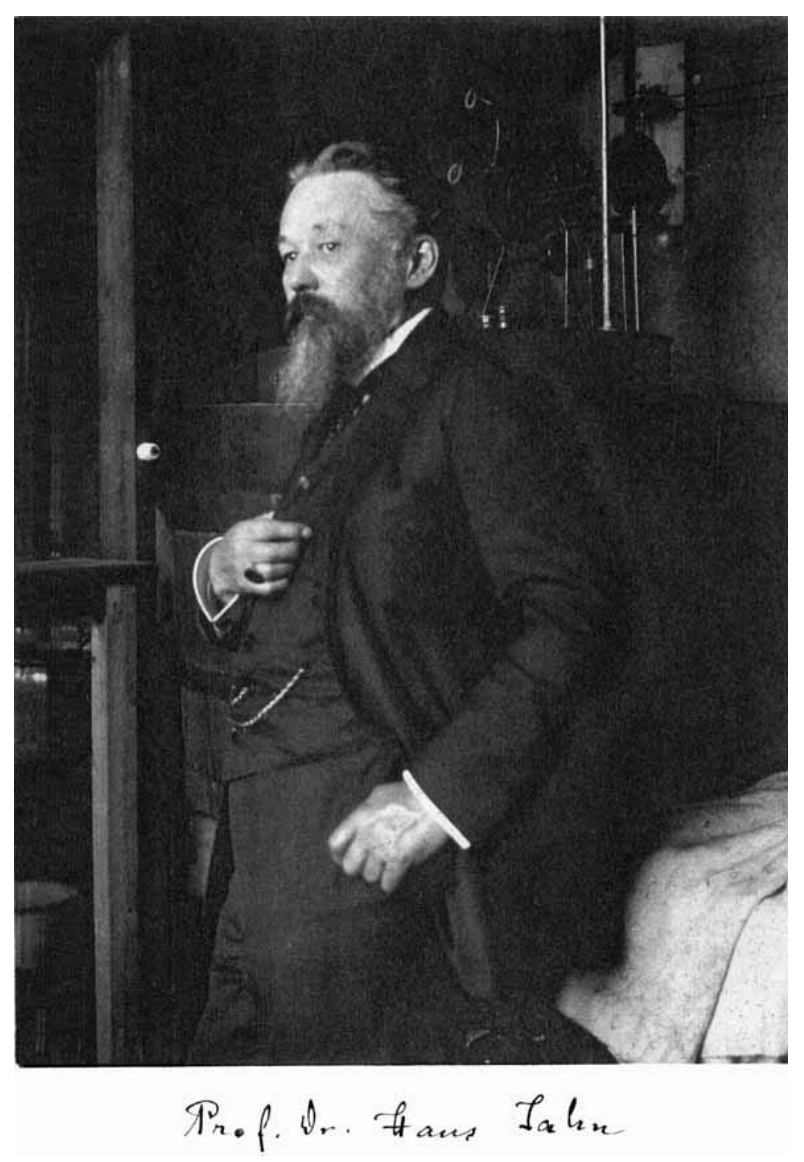

Hans Max Jahn (4 July 1853 – 7 August 1906) was a German physical chemist who worked on thermochemistry and electrochemistry. As an experimental chemist he identified problems in the contemporary theory of electrolyte conductivity and examined the thermodynamic validity of the Gibbs-Helmholtz equation.

Jahn was born in Küstrin (now in Poland) and was educated at the Universities of Berlin and Heidelberg in chemistry and mathematics. His early influences included A. W. von Hofmann whom he assisted as a student, Robert Bunsen, G. Kirchhoff and the mathematician L. Kronecker. After receiving a doctorate in 1875 for work in organic chemistry he became an assistant to Anastassios Christomanos at Athens. In 1877 he moved to Vienna, working under Ernst Ludwig (1842–1915) and in 1884 he moved to Graz. From 1899 he taught at the agricultural school and university in Berlin. Jahn worked with Walther Nernst and one of his experimental result in 1900 was that there was an increased conductivity with an increase in concentration of certain electrolytes. This went against the theory that Svante August Arrhenius has proposed and resulted in a major debate.

Jahn married Sophie von Sichrovsky in 1883. Jahn was a keen violinist but suffered from deteriorating hearing. He died in 1906 following complications after an appendictomy.
