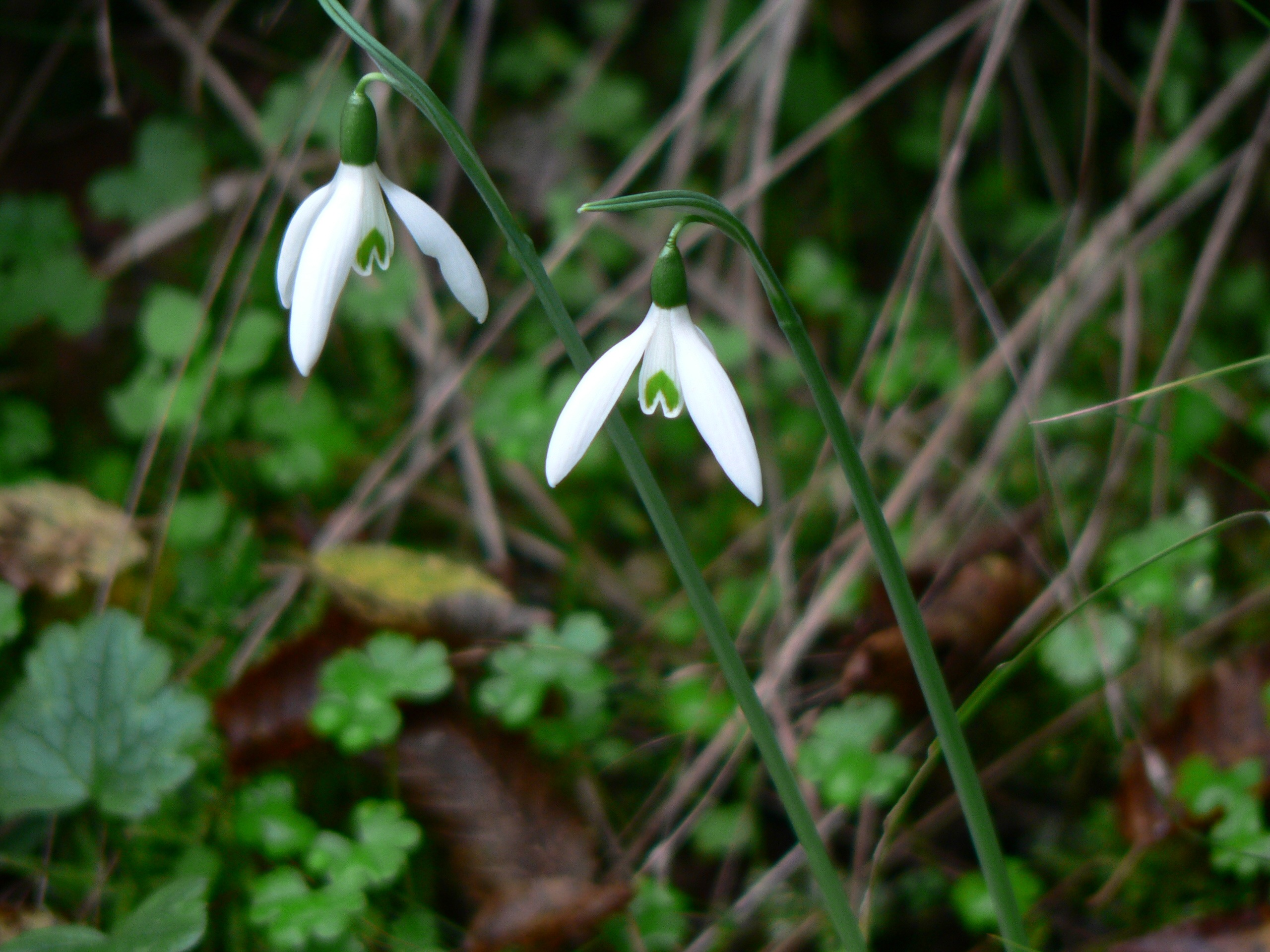
- In habitat in northern Greece

Conservation status
- Vulnerable (IUCN 3.1)
- CITES Appendix II

Scientific classification
- Kingdom: Plantae
- Clade: Embryophytes
- Clade: Tracheophytes
- Clade: Spermatophytes
- Clade: Angiosperms
- Clade: Monocots
- Order: Asparagales
- Family: Amaryllidaceae
- Subfamily: Amaryllidoideae
- Genus: Galanthus
- Species: G. reginae-olgae

Binomial name
- Galanthus reginae-olgae Orph.

Synonyms
- Galanthus olgae Orph. ex Boiss.; Galanthus corcyrensis (Beck) Stern; Galanthus reginae-olgae subsp. corcyrensis (Beck) Kamari; Galanthus nivalis subsp. reginae-olgae (Orph.) Gottl.-Tann.

= Galanthus reginae-olgae =

Species of flowering plant

Galanthus reginae-olgae, Queen Olga's snowdrop, is a species of flowering plant in the family Amaryllidaceae, native to Sicily and the west and north-west Balkans (parts of Greece and the former Yugoslavia). Some variants produce their pendant white flowers in autumn, others in winter and early spring. It is cultivated as ornamental bulbous plant, preferring warmer situations in the garden than other species of Galanthus (snowdrops).

== Description ==
Galanthus reginae-olgae has revolute leaves that are dark green with a central silver line and when fully grown are 11–15 cm (4.3–5.9 in) long by 3–8 mm wide. Its flowers have three larger outer tepals, pure white, and three smaller inner tepals, white with variable green markings near the tips. The outer tepals are about 15–35 mm long, the inner ones 9–12 mm long. Populations of Galanthus reginae-olgae that flower at different times, with or without the leaves being fully developed, have been described as separate species or subspecies. Those described as G. reginae-olgae subsp. reginae-olgae flower in the autumn, either before the leaves develop or with the leaves. Those described as G. reginae-olgae subsp. vernalis flower in late winter or early spring, with the leaves.

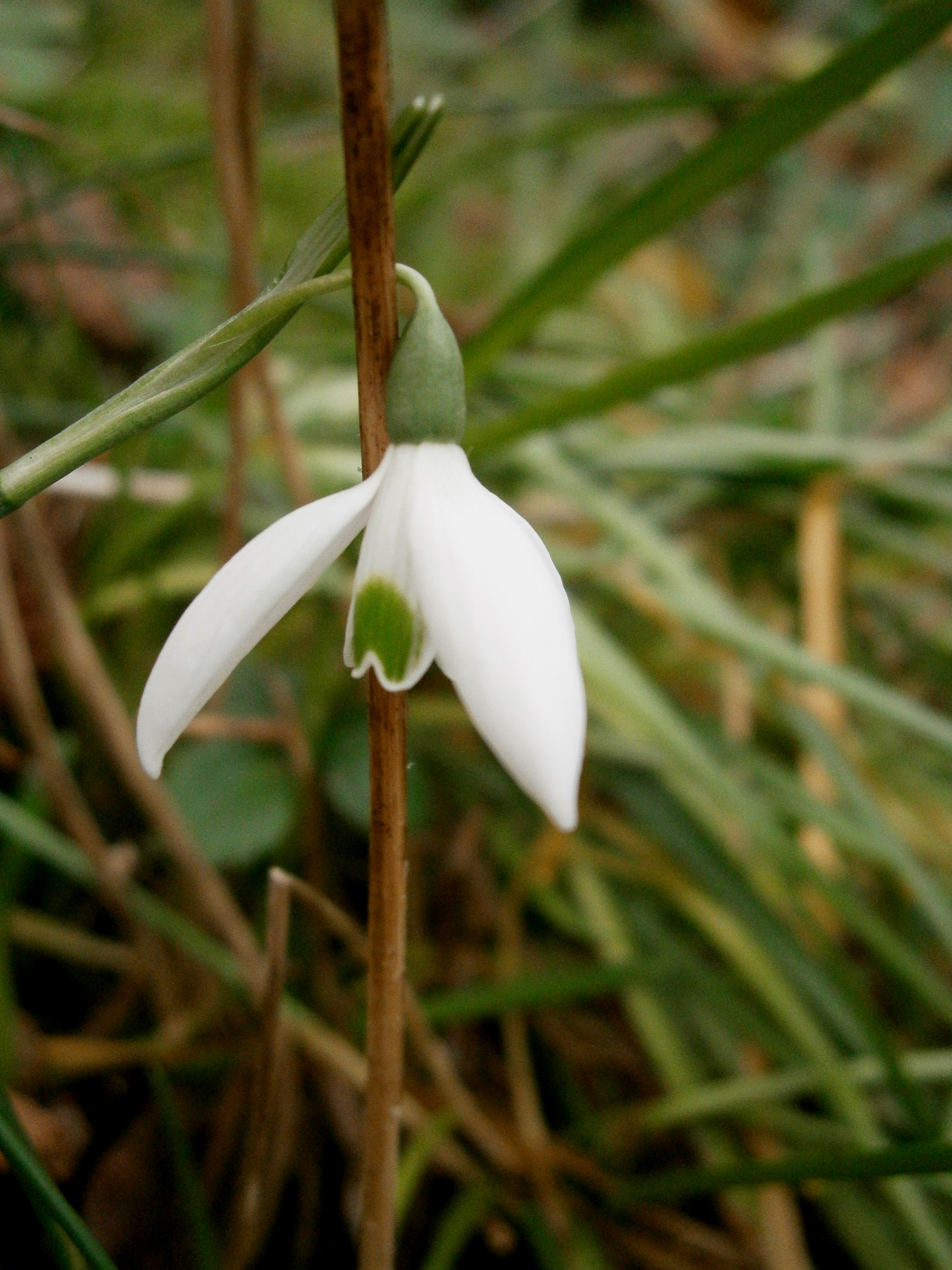
Flower with quite large green markings

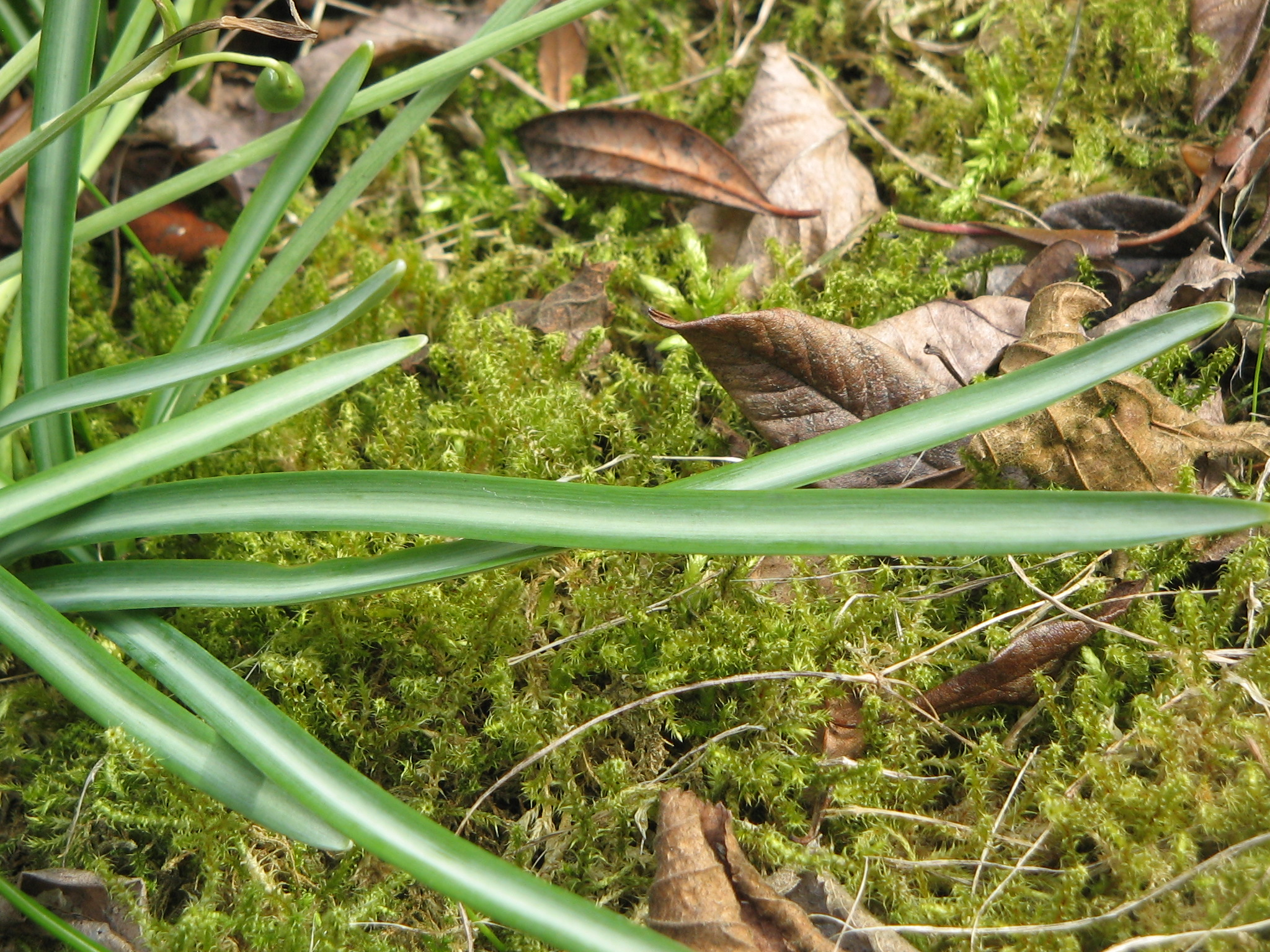
Leaves

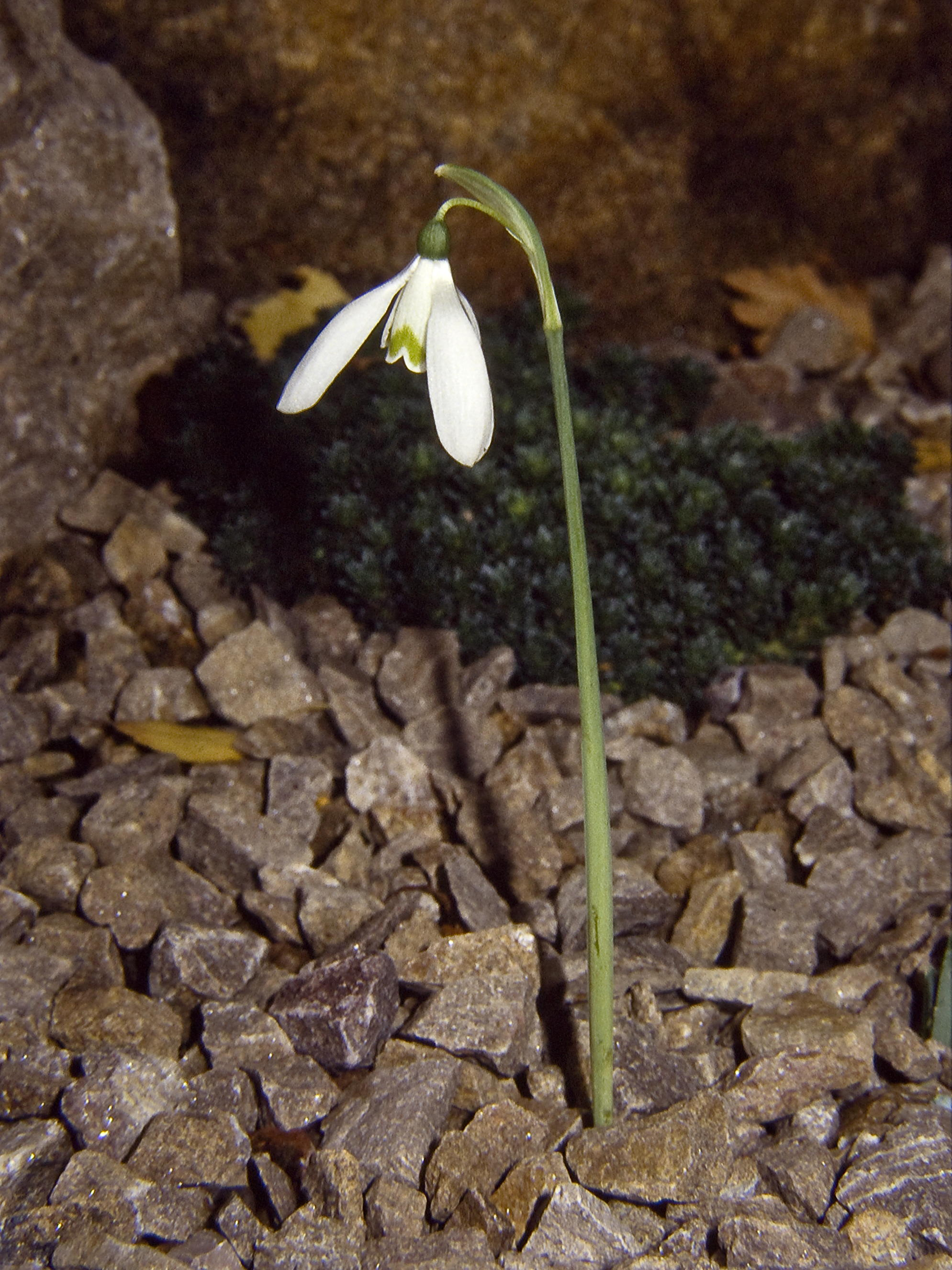
Flowering in autumn without leaves (in cultivation)

== Taxonomy ==
Galanthus reginae-olgae was first described in 1876 by Theodoros G. Orphanides. The epithet reginae-olgae means 'of Queen Olga'; Olga Constantinovna of Russia was then Queen of Greece. The species (or when divided into subspecies, its autonymous subspecies) has been treated as Galanthus nivalis subsp. reginae-olgae. Other regularly used synonyms include G. olgae and G. corcyrensis. The name Galanthus corcyrensis has been particularly used for plants that flower in the autumn with the leaves rather than before them.

=== Subspecies ===
The species has been divided into two subspecies, distinguished by the time of flowering:

- Galanthus reginae-olgae subsp. reginae-olgae – flowering in autumn
- Galanthus reginae-olgae subsp. vernalis Kamari – flowering in late winter to spring

There is however no sharp division between these two subspecies.

== Distribution and habitat ==
Galanthus reginae-olgae is native to Sicily and parts of the Balkans, in particular Greece and former Yugoslavia. It is found in relatively dry, shady woodland.

== Cultivation ==
Galanthus reginae-olgae is cultivated as an ornamental bulbous plant, particularly the autumn-flowering variants. In cultivation, it requires a warmer and sunnier position than most other Galanthus species. The cultivar 'Cambridge', originating from the Cambridge University Botanic Garden, has large green markings on the inner tepals.

Galanthus reginae-olgae subsp. reginae-olgae has received the Royal Horticultural Society's Award of Garden Merit.
