= Alexander Negris =

Greek philologist and university professor

- Ἀλέξανδρος Νέγρης
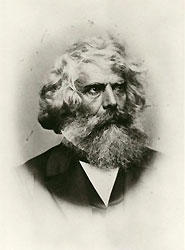
- Born: c. 1805; Constantinople
- Died: 1860/1880; Athens or Scotland
- Other names: Phanariots
- Occupation: Professor of Greek
- Employer(s): Harvard; University of Glasgow; University of Edinburgh
- Known for: Freedom Fighter; Author
- Spouse: Eliza Negris
- Parents: Alexander Negris (father); Eleni Ypsilanti (mother)
- Relatives: Const. Ypsilantis (grandfather); Demetrios Ypsilantis (uncle); Alexander Ypsilantis (uncle); Konstantinos Negris (cousin); Theodoros Negris (cousin)
- Family: Negris; Ypsilantis

Alexander Negris (c. 1805 - 1860/80; Greek: Ἀλέξανδρος Νέγρης) was a military colonel, author, philologist, and professor. He participated in the Greek War of Independence with other members of his family; indeed, he was a member of the phanariots family's Negris and Ypsilanti. He was the first lecturer of Modern Greek at Harvard University and set the framework for Evangelinos Apostolides Sophocles. He was a Greek language philologist and linguist and wrote countless books in Greek for the education of the English-speaking world. Negris was a member of different organizations all over the world and honorary member of the Archaeological Society of Athens. The Ypsilanti township in Michigan is named after his uncle Demetrios Ypsilantis.

== History ==
Alexander was born in Constantinople. The family was part of the Faneri district of Constantinople. His father was Alexander and his mother was Eleni. His grandfather was Constantine Ypsilantis. His uncles were Alexander Ypsilantis and Demetrios Ypsilantis. Alexander became a member of the Filiki Eteria. They were one of the most important family alliances of the Greek War of Independence. He briefly visited Russia. When Alexander was sixteen the Greek War of Independence broke out and he was an active participant. He was the General Secretary for Western Greece. Towards the end of the 1820s he was dispatched to the United States. His cousin Konstantinos Negris was sent to study in France by Alexandros Mavrokordatos. While Alexander was in the United States he lectured at Harvard University and began to publish books.

By 1829, he traveled to Edinburgh Scotland. He published more books in Scotland. In 1838, he met Eliza Sweet in London. They got married and lived in Scotland. He eventually became a professor at the University of Glasgow. In 1839, he lived at 13 Clyde Street in Edinburgh Scotland. In 1846, they also lived at Saint Georg Square in the same city. He traveled back and forth to Greece. By 1852, he cowrote a church book with Alexandrou Sturza. The book was in Greek and Russian.

== Literary ==
Books and Articles authored by Alexander Negris
Date	Title
1828	A Grammar of the Modern Greek Language, with an Appendix Containing Original Specimens of Prose and Verse
1829	The Orations of Aeschines and Demosthenes on the Crown: With Modern Greek Prolegomena, and English Notes
1831	A Dictionary of Modern Greek Proverbs with an English Translation, Explanatory Remarks, and Philological Illustrations
1834	Xenophon's Anabasis School Edition with English Notes
1835	Xenophon's Expedition of Cyrus, in Seven Books, with Various Readings, Notes, and Index
1835	The Works of Pindar: With Various Readings, Notes, and Emendations
1843	The History of Herodotus In Nine Books

Books and Articles in another Language authored by Alexander Negris
Date	Title	Translation
1852	Επιστολαί περί των καθηκόντων της ιερωσύνης, / Συγγραφείσα μεν Ρωσσιστί υπό Αλεξάνδρου Στούρζα, Εξελληνισθείσα δε υπό Αλεξάνδρου Νέγρη.	Epistles Concerning the Duties of the Priesthood / Written in Russian under Alexandrou Sturza, Hellenized under Alexandrou Negri.

== Bibliography ==
- Volkert, Klaus; Menghini, Marta; Barbin, Évelyne (2019). Descriptive Geometry, The Spread of a Polytechnic Art The Legacy of Gaspard Monge. Cham, Switzerland: Springer International Publishing. ISBN 9783030148089.
- Friedrich, Ernst; Carl, Rosenmueller (1841). The Biblical Geography of Asia Minor, Phoenicia, and Arabia. Edinburgh, Scotland: Thomas Clark Publishing.
- Filippou, Demetrios A. (2009). Τό Εύτυπον Τό Άπλονν Àλφαβητάριον καί Àλλες Eκδόσεις Γενικού Ένδιαφέροντος [The Eutypon The Plain Alphabet and Other Publications of General Interest] (PDF). Athens, GR: Association of the Greek Friends of TeX.
- Dickson, Thomas Miller (1852). Testimonials in favour of Thomas Miller Dickson as a candidate for the Chair of Greek, in the University of Edinburgh. Edinburgh, Scotland: Neil and Company.
