= Anastasios Damvergis =

Greek pharmacist and university professor

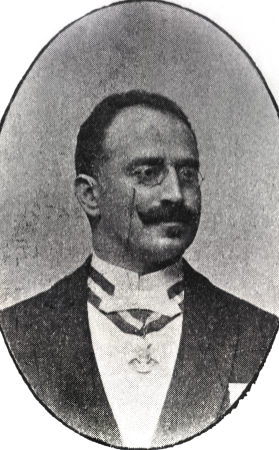
- Born: 1857; Mykonos, Greece
- Died: 1920 (aged 62–63); Athens, Greece
- Education: University of Athens; Heidelberg University; University of Berlin; Sorbonne
- Awards: Order of the Saviour; Order of the Crown of Italy
- Scientific career
- Fields: Chemistry; Pharmacology; Medicine; Organic Chemistry
- Workplaces: University of Athens; Evelpidon; Naval Academy
- Doctoral advisors: Robert Bunsen
- Other academic advisors: Charles Wurtz; August Hofmann

Anastasios Damvergis (Greek: Αναστάσιος Κ. Δαμβέργης; 1857–1920) was an author, dean, chemist, pharmacist, and professor. He was one of the first modern pharmacists in Greece.

He wrote a 1200-page volume entitled Greek Pharmacopoeia outlining modern pharmaceutical formulas and remedies. The Greek government made the book the second official Greek state pharmacopoeis in 1901. He introduced modern pharmaceutical laboratories in different educational institutions and wrote textbooks in the field of chemistry and pharmacy; in addition, he also wrote articles for pharmaceutical and medical journals.

Anastasios was born in Mykonos, his father was Cretan military commander Konstantinos Damvergis. Anastasios completed his pharmaceutical degree at the University of Athens and continued his studies in Germany. In Germany he studied with Robert Bunsen and Siegmund Gabriel. Anastasios did research ranging from spectrum analysis to synthetic chemistry. He also briefly studied at the University of Berlin and the Sorbonne. Anastasios returned to Greece and became a pharmacy professor at the University of Athens and became the chair of the department. He also briefly taught at the Hellenic Naval Academy and Evelpidon; likewise, he assisted the Greek government regarding pharmaceutical affairs.

Anastasios attended many international chemistry and pharmaceutical summits representing Greece. He influenced countless students including Tilemachos Komninos. He served as Dean of the Philosophical School which was part of the University of Athens from 1898-1899. He was an honorary member of the School of Pharmacy of Brixton, of the Societies of Biological Chemistry and of Arts and Letters of London and he was an officer of the Order of the Saviour of Greece and a commander in the Order of the Crown of Italy.

== History ==
Anastasios was born in Mykonos. He was the son of Cretan military commander Konstantinos Damvergis. Anastasios came from a very prominent Greek family and showed an interest in the sciences from a young age. He initially studied in Piraeus where he finished his early education at a prestigious high school. Anastasios continued his studies at the University of Athens where he became a Pharmacist in 1875. His professors were Anastasios Christomanos, Stamatios D. Krinos, and Xaver Landerer. Because he was an extraordinary student he continued his studies at the University of Heidelberg under Robert Bunson and Siegmund Gabriel. His research included the special study of spectrum analysis, the analysis of gas, mineral water, and the separation of the rare earth elements. Under the supervision of Gabriel, he completed work in the field of synthetic chemistry. Anastasios continued his studies at the University of Berlin under August Wilhelm von Hofmann and then traveled to Paris where he attended the Sorbonne under Charles Adolphe Wurtz. He returned to Greece where he initially taught at Evelpidon and the Hellenic Naval Academy for ten years. He also held the chair of chemistry at the Naval Academy for six of those years. While at the institutions he introduced chemical laboratories.

Anastasios was also a high school teacher and wrote several chemistry textbooks. By 1882, Anastasios was appointed professor at the pharmaceutical school a position which he held until 1920. Because of his hi level of education, he was nominated head of the office at the Ministry of Economics and by 1890 he was the director of the office at the Customs Department. In both instances, he was nominated by Charilaos Trikoupis. Anastasios was in charge of alcohol and tobacco, a position he held until the next administration. By 1892, he became the chair of the Pharmaceutical Chemistry department at the University of Athens. Anastasios was crucial in revitalizing the Laboratory of Pharmaceutical Chemistry. Around this period he also became a member of the medical council. By 1894, he represented the Greek Government at the Scientific Congress in Brussels as the president of agricultural chemistry and presented an important essay on tobacco. He published a 500-page book on modern remedies by 1908 and also wrote a 1200-page volume on Greek Pharmacopoeia outlining modern pharmaceutical formulas and remedies. Greek Pharmacopoeia was accepted by the Greek government and became the pharmaceutical standard. He has also published a number of articles for pharmaceutical and chemical literature. He made countless contributions to the chemistry of modern Greece by proposing laws and regulations for the advancement of pharmaceutical chemistry for the conservation of the health and welfare of the general public, specifically for factory workers. He owned a world-renowned pharmacy known as the University Pharmacy in Athens, it was opposite the National Library and near the School of Athens.

== Scientific Work ==
Siegmund Gabriel is well known in the field of organic chemistry for the Gabriel synthesis. He was one of Robert Bunsen's students. Anastasios and Gabriel worked on different organic reactions together. They studied the nitro derivatives of diphenyl mono and disulphinic acids. They worked with diphenyl disulfide and derived a method for preparing amido-diphenly di-sulphydrate (aminophenyl disulfide). They also worked with p-diphenly-p-thio-glycollic acid (benzilic acid) deriving a method for its preparation. Anastasios continued researching organic compounds in Greece significantly contributing to the nomenclature of newly synthesized compounds in the Greek language.

== Literary works ==
Books and Articles authored by Anastasios Dambergis
Date	Title	Title in English
1880	Περί Χημικής Συνθέσεως και της Τεχνητής των Αλκαλοειδών Παρασκευής	Chemical Synthesis and the Artificial Preparation of Alkaloids
1886	Νοθεύσεις Εδωδίμων και Ποτών και Εξέλεγξις Αυτών	Mixture of Edibles and Drinks and their Composition
1888	Μαθήματα χημείας διδαχθέντα εν τη Στρατιωτική Σχολή των Ευελπίδων. Μέρος 1ον Μεταλλοειδή. Μέρος 2ον Μέταλλα. Μέρος 3ον Ενώσεις του Άνθρακος	Chemistry courses taught at the Evelpidon. Part 1 Metalloids. Part 2 Metals. Part 3 Compounds of Carbon 1888
1888	Περί των Εκρηκτικών Ουσιών	Explosives
1890	Στοιχεία Χημείας	Elements of Chemistry
1891	Νοθεύσεις Υφασμάτων και Δερμάτων και Εξέλεγξις Αυτών	Composition of Cloth and Leather and its Analysis
1892	Οδηγός προς Εξέτασιν των Ούρων, της Υποστάθμης Αυτών και των Ουρολίθων	Guide to the Examination of Urine, the Hypolevel and the Urolithium Content
1894	Οι Καπνοί και τα Τουμπεκιά της Ελλάδος Χημικώς Εξεταζόμενα	The Chemical Examination of the Tobaccos of Greece
1898	Τα Νέα Φάρμακα	The New Drugs
1900	Ελληνική Φαρμακοποιία	Greek Pharmacopoeia
1900	Ο Υλικός Κόσμος	The Material World
1900	Ρόμπερτ Μπούνσεν	Robert Bunsen
1908	Φαρμακοποιία	Pharmakopoiia
1912	Φαρμακοτεχνικά Οροθεραπευτικα Και Οργανοθεραπευτικά Σκευασμάτα	Pharmaceutical Serotherapeutic and Organtherapeutic Treatments

== Bibliography ==
- Dambergis, Anastasios K. (1912). "The Condition of Pharmacy in Greece". American Druggist Pharmaceutical Record. 60 (12).
- Stefanidis, Michail K. (1952). Εθνικόν και Καποδιστριακόν Πανεπιστήμιον Αθηνών Εκατονταετηρίς 1837-1937. Τόμος Ε′, Ιστορία της Φυσικομαθηματικής Σχολής [National and Kapodistrian University of Athens Centenary 1837-1937. Volume V, History of the Faculty of Physics and Mathematics] (PDF). Athens: National and Kapodistrian University of Athens.
- Savaidou, Irini Mergoupi (2010). 'Δημόσιος Λόγος περί Επιστήμης στην Ελλάδα, 1870–1900: Εκλαϊκευτικά Εγχειρήματα στο Πανεπιστήμιο Αθηνών, στους Πολιτιστικούς Συλλόγους και στα Περιοδικά [Public Discourse about Science in Greece, 1870-1900: Population Projects at the University of Athens, in Cultural Associations and Magazines] (PDF). Athens, GR: Department of History and Philosophy of Science of the University of Athens.
- Tampakis, Costas (2013). Sciences and religion: Their interaction in the borders of Europe (1832-1915) (PDF). Athens, GR: Colloque International, Europe et Sciences Modernes, Histoire d’un Engendrement Mutuel, Nantes, 21-22/2/2013.
- Williams, W.C. (1880). "Nitro Derivatives of Diphenly Mono and Disulphinic Acids". Journal of the Chemical Society. 38. London UK.
- Watts, Henry (1890). Watts' Dictionary of Chemistry Volume 1. London, UK: Longmans Green and Co.
