= Ioannis Papadakis =

Greek mathematician and university professor

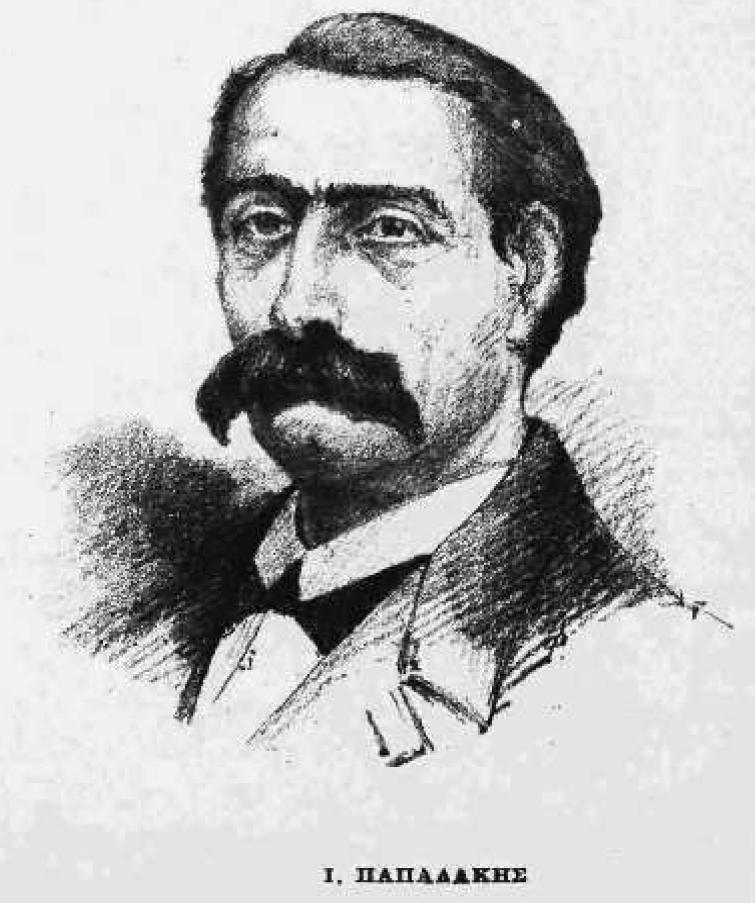
- Born: c. 1820; Tzitzifes, Crete
- Died: 1876; Athens, Greece
- Education: Ludwig-Maximilians-Universität München; Ecole Polytechnique; Ecole des Mines; University of Athens
- Father: Giorgios Papadakis
- Scientific career
- Fields: Mathematics; Astronomy; Descriptive geometry
- Workplaces: University of Athens; Athens Polytechnic; National Observatory of Athens
- Academic advisors: Konstantinos Negris

Ioannis G. Papadakis (c. 1820 – 1876 Greek: Ιωάννης Παπαδάκης) was a writer, mathematician, physicist, astronomer, meteorologist, and professor. He was the second director of the National Observatory of Athens. He temporarily succeeded Georgios Konstantinos Vouris until Johann Friedrich Julius Schmidt replaced him as the third director of the observatory. His most notable work was the observation of the Moons of Jupiter and other meteorological observations in the 1850s. He was also a Scottish rite freemason.

== Biography ==
Ioannis was born on the island of Crete around 1820. The Greek War of Independence broke out the same period. His father Giorgios was an active participant in the revolution. Giorgios nickname was Ksepapas. He was a commander in Greek War of Independence around 1821. He was also responsible for the Greek rebel's economic affairs. He represented the island of Crete as a proxy in the Second National Assembly held in Astros Kynourias between 29 March and 18 April 1823. Giorgios was killed in Gramvousa several years later during the Greek Revolution. From a young age, Ioannis showed an interest in the sciences. Ioannis's mentor was Greek physics professor Konstantinos Negris. He advised him to study in Munich.

Ioannis traveled to Germany and studied at the Ludwig-Maximilians-Universität München from 1833 to 1837. He studied mathematics and astronomy. He briefly returned to Athens and finished a master's degree at the University of Athens. He studied mathematics and physics. He excelled in his studies and the Greek government paid for him to complete his studies at the Ludwig-Maximilians-Universität München. In 1842, he traveled to Paris and attended the elite prestigious institutions Ecole Polytechnique (1842) and the Ecole des Mines (1844). Joseph Bertrand and Auguste Bravais were professors at the Ecole Polytechnique at the time. Francois Arago was also affiliated with the school and Greek physicist Dimitrios Stroumpos studied at the university a decade earlier. When Ioannis returned to Greece he was assistant to Georgios Konstantinos Vouris at the National Observatory of Athens.

Ioannis began teaching at the University of Athens in 1850. He taught astronomy and analysis. The Greek government was constantly unstable. The people disliked the new monarch King Otto. The Greek revolt of 1843 was an important event because all foreign professors were expelled from the University of Athens around the same period. The world-renowned astronomer Georgios Konstantinos Vouris was Greek-Austrian. He was from the same country as the King of Greece King Otto. The University of Athens was constantly drawn into political debate. Regrettably, Georgios Konstantinos Vouris was the victim of politics. He resigned his position as director of the National Observatory of Athens and moved back to Austria. Papadakis assumed the position as director for three years from 1855 to 1858. The faculty of the University of Athens, Georgios Sinas and his son Simon Sinas pleaded with Vouris to return to the observatory but Vouris declined. Simon Sinas and Vouris were allowed to choose his predecessor. They chose German astronomer Johann Friedrich Julius Schmidt. Papadakis did not want to stay in the position because it was demanding, and he was a full-time faculty member at two universities at the time he worked at the University of Athens and the Athens Polytechnic University.

During the 1850s, Papadakis was an assistant to Vouris. He did extensive meteorological research and published some of his works. He also helped Vouris conduct his research. During the same period, he introduced complex descriptive geometry to his students at the university. Records indicate he taught descriptive geometry at the Athens Polytechnic University from 1853 and 1856. He taught the new mathematical methods introduced in France. He influenced Nikolaos Ch. Nikolaidis, Cyparissos Stephanos, Vassilios Lakon and John Hazzidakis.

Papadakis resigned in protest in 1856 when Joseph Mindler (1808–1868) a Bavarian officer of the royal court and stenographer of the Parliament was hired to teach stenography. Mindler was paid a significantly higher salary than Papadakis. The government in response offered to pay Papadakis higher wages. On 10 May 1859, a political incident rocked the university community when the students were involved in a massive protest called the skiadika (σκιαδικά). Several years later in October 1862, King Otto was exiled to never return to Greece. Papadakis and the college community continued to flourish. Papadakis became dean of the Philosophical School twice, and he also became president of the University of Athens right before his death in the academic year 1876–1877. He wrote for several publications in Greece. He wrote about his observations of the moons of Jupiter and published it in the Greek paper Logodos (Λογοδος). He also published meteorological observations in local Greek newspapers and was a member of the Greek archeological society.

== Literary works ==
Books and Articles authored by Ioannis Papadakis
Date	Title	Title in English
1851–53	Παρατηρήσεις επι Τών Δορθφόρων τού Διός (Λογοδος)	Observations of the Moons of Jupiter published in Logodos (Λογοδος)
1857	Suite Régulière d'observations Météorologiques Faites à l'Observatoire d'Athènes	Series of Meteorological Observations made in Athens
1861–1871	Διάφορες Μετεωρολογικές Παρατηρήσεις (Ελληνικές Εφημερίδες)	Meteorological Observations (Greek Newspapers)
1866	Εθνικόν Ημερολόγιον Βρετού	Astronomical Observations for the National Greek Calendar

== Bibliography ==
- Theodossiou, E.Th.; Manimanis, V.N.; Mantarakis, P. (2007). "Demetrios Eginitis Restorer of the Athens Observatory" (PDF). Journal of Astronomical History and Heritage. 10 (2): 123. Bibcode:2007JAHH...10..123T. doi:10.3724/SP.J.1440-2807.2007.02.05. ISSN 1440-2807. S2CID 129260817.
- Freninger, Franz Xaver (1872). Das Matrikelbuch der Universitaet Ingolstadt-Landshut-München [The Matriculation book of the University of Ingolstadt-Landshut-Munich]. Munich, Germany: Druck and Verlag Publishing.
- Matsopoulos, Nicolas T. (2012). "Η Συμβολή της Αστρονομίας στον Νεοελληνικό Διαφωτισμό - η ίδρυση του Αστεροσκοπείου Αθηνών" [The Contribution of Astronomy to the Neo-Greek Enlightenment – The Foundation of the Athens Observatory]. Acta of Conference: Rigas Ferraios, Ioannis Capodistrias, Francisco de Miranda Volume B. Thessaloniki, Greece: Aristotle University of Thessaloniki Academy of Institutions and Cultures Society.
- Vlahakis, George N (2012). Early Attempts at Weather Prediction and Climate Description in 19th Century Greece. Athens, Greece: Institute for Neohellenic Research and the National Hellenic Research Foundation.
- Harvey, Stephen; Matsopoulos, Nicolas (2020). The Moon A Translation of Der Mond by Johann Friedrich Julius Schmidt. Horsham, United Kingdom: Springer. ISBN 978-3-030-37269-9.
- Volkert, Klaus; Menghini, Marta; Barbin, Évelyne (2019). Descriptive Geometry, The Spread of a Polytechnic Art The Legacy of Gaspard Monge. Cham, Switzerland: Springer International Publishing. ISBN 9783030148089.
- Stefanidou, Micheal K. (1952). Εθνικόν και Καποδιστριακόν Πανεπιστήμιον Αθηνών Εκατονταετηρίς 1837-1937 Ιστορία της Φυσικομαθηματικής Σχολής [National and Kapodistrian University of Athens Centenary 1837–1937 History of the Faculty of Physics and Mathematics]. Athens, Greece: National and Kapodistrian University of Athens.
- Drummond, Josiah H.; Paige, Clinton F.; Moriarty, Albert P. (1877). Proceedings Scottish Rite (Masonic order) Supreme Council for the Northern Jurisdiction. Binghamton, N.Y: Republican Print.
