= Karl Nikolaus Fraas =

German botanist and agriculturist (1810–1875)

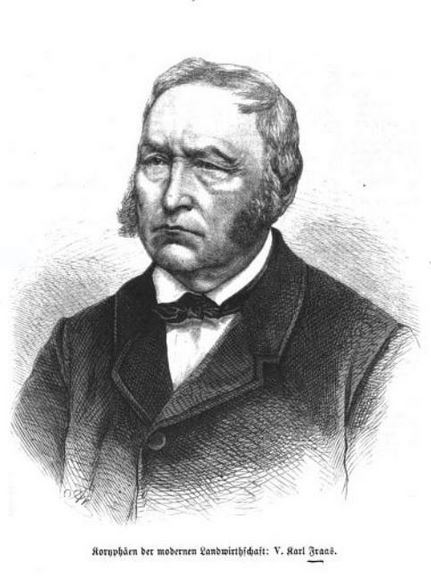
Karl Nikolaus Fraas

Karl Nikolaus Fraas (8 September 1810 – 9 November 1875), German botanist and agriculturist, was born at Rattelsdorf, near Bamberg. After receiving his preliminary education at the gymnasium of Bamberg, he entered the Ludwig-Maximilians-Universität München in 1830, where he took his doctor's degree in 1834. Having devoted great attention to the study of botany, he went to Athens in 1835 as inspector of the court garden; and in April 1836 he became professor of botany at the National University of Athens. In 1842-1843 he returned to Germany because of The Greek Revolution of September 3, 1843 all the foreign professors were expelled from the National University of Athens. He became teacher at the central agricultural school at Schleißheim Germany. In 1847, he was appointed professor of agriculture at the Ludwig-Maximilians-Universität München, and in 1851 director of the central veterinary college. For many years he was secretary of the Agricultural Society of Bavaria, before resigning in 1861. He died on his estate of Neufreimann, near Munich.

== History ==
He was born on September 8, 1810, in Rettelsdorf, Germany. He studied medicine and botany at the Ludwig-Maximilians-Universität München, from where he received his doctorate in 1834. His thesis was entitled: De Smilaceis brasiliensibus and he was given a certificate of teaching proficiency for German schools. He was an assistant to Carl Friedrich Philipp von Martius and Joseph Gerhard Zuccarini. He came to Greece in 1835 and was appointed director of the Forestry School at the Athens Botanical Garden. On April 16 of the same year, together with Xaver Landerer and Kyriakos Domnandos, he founded the Physiographic Society. In 1837, he was appointed professor of Botany at the National University of Athens. In 1838, he married Adelheid Voigt, lady-in-waiting to Queen Amalia of Greece, and they had nine children.

During the month of September 1843, the people were unhappy with the foreign monarch chosen to lead the new country. They led a rebellion known as the Revolution of September 3, 1843. The people were granted a constitutional monarchy. Regrettably, all the foreign professors were expelled from the National University of Athens in favor of Greek professors. Fraas, Xaver Landerer, Friedrich Zentner, Charles Laurent, Christian Hansen, Konstantinos Negris, and Theophil Hansen were all expelled. Fraas returned to Germany. Xaver Landerer replaced him as the botany professor. Within one year most of the foreign faculty were rehired.

Fraas became a professor at the Royal Agricultural and Commercial School of Freising and the Botanical School of Schlesheim in Germany. There he conducted several experiments on fertilizers. During this period he wrote the Synopsis plantarum florae classicae where he corresponded Greek with the Latin names of plants. In 1847, he was appointed professor of agriculture at the Ludwig-Maximilians-Universität München and in 1851 director of the central veterinary school. His experiments there led him to the invention of the lysimeter, a tool used to extract and analyze soil solution. He was secretary of the Bavarian Agricultural Society and resigned in 1861. He was curator of the Central Experiment Office of the Association of Bavarian Agronomists, and it was he who contributed to the start of fertilizer production in Bavaria and the establishment of agricultural associations. He died on 10 November [4] 1875, in Neufreimann, Munich.

== Works ==
His principal works are:

- Synopsis plantarum florae classicae (Munich, 1845);
- Klima und Pflanzenwelt in der Zeit (Landshut, 1847);
- Historisch-encyklopädischer Grundriß der Landwirthschaftslehre (Stuttgart, 1848);
- Geschichte der Landwirthschaft (Prague, 1851);
- Die Schule des Landbaues (Munich, 1852);
- Baierns Rinderrassen (Munich, 1853);
- Die künstliche Fischerzeugung (Munich, 1854);
- Die Natur der Landwirthschaft (Munich, 1857);
- Buch der Natur fur Landwirthe (Munich, 1860);
- Die Ackerbaukrisen und ihre Heilmittel (Munich, 1866);
- Das Wurzelleben der Cultur-pflanzen (Berlin, 1872); and
- Geschichte der Landbau und Forstwissenschaft seit dem 16 Jahrh. (Munich, 1865).

He also founded and edited a weekly agricultural paper, the Schranne.

== Karl Marx's references to Fraas ==
Karl Marx took an interest in Fraas's work, writing to Engels on 25 March 1868 that he found Fraas's 1847 work Climate and the Vegetable World throughout the Ages, a History of Both "very interesting, especially as proving that climate and flora have changed in historic times".

Marx calls Fraas "a Darwinist before Darwin" and goes on to say:

This man is both a thoroughly learned philologist (he has written books in Greek) and a chemist, agricultural expert, etc. The whole conclusion is that cultivation when it progresses in a primitive way and is not consciously controlled (as a bourgeois of course he does not arrive at this), leaves deserts behind it, Persia, Mesopotamia, etc., Greece. Here again another unconscious socialist tendency!

These references to Fraas are of interest to recent scholars of Marx's ecological ideas.

== Bibliography ==
- Freninger, Franz Xaver (1872). Das Matrikelbuch der Universitaet Ingolstadt-Landshut-München [The Matriculation book of the University of Ingolstadt-Landshut-Munich]. Munich, Germany: Druck and Verlag Publishing.
- Volkert, Klaus; Menghini, Marta; Barbin, Évelyne (2019). Descriptive Geometry, The Spread of a Polytechnic Art The Legacy of Gaspard Monge. Cham, Switzerland: Springer International Publishing. ISBN 9783030148089.
- Vlahakis, George N.; Economou-Amilli, Athina (2012). Botany in Greece During the 19th Century: A Periphery at the Center. Istanbul, Turkey: Osmanlı Bilimi Araştırmaları XIII/2.
- Stefanidou, Micheal K. (1952). Εθνικόν και Καποδιστριακόν Πανεπιστήμιον Αθηνών Εκατονταετηρίς 1837-1937 Ιστορία της Φυσικομαθηματικής Σχολής [National and Kapodistrian University of Athens Centenary 1837-1937 History of the Faculty of Physics and Mathematics] (PDF). Athens, Greece: National and Kapodistrian University of Athens.
