= Konstantinos Negris =

Greek mathematician and university professor

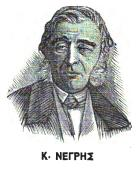
- Born: 1804; Constantinople, Ottoman Empire (now Istanbul, Turkey)
- Died: 1880 (aged 75–76); Athens, Greece
- Education: Ecole Polytechnique
- Spouse: Smaragda Spiropoulou
- Children: Theodoros Negris; Fokion Negris; Eleni (Negri) Notara
- Relatives: Alexander Negris (cousin)
- Scientific career
- Fields: Mathematics; Descriptive geometry
- Workplaces: University of Athens

Konstantinos Negris (1804 - 1880; Greek: Κωνσταντίνος Νέγρης) was a writer, mathematician, physicist, and professor. He fought in the Greek War of Independence. Konstantinos was a member of the prominent Phanariots family Negris. He was one of the first professors at the newly founded University of Athens and introduced the works of Legendre and Hachette to Greek education, also he was one of the first professors to study abroad; consequently, Greek students continued their studies in France and Germany. He personally intervened in the education of Greek mathematician Ioannis Papadakis. Both Papadakis and Negris influenced the educational path of Nikolaos Ch. Nikolaidis and Cyparissos Stephanos. Konstantino's sons were Theodoros Negris and Fokion Negris.

== Biography ==
Konstantinos was born in Constantinople around 1804. His father was Ioannis Negris and his mother was Katerina Manou. The family was originally from Constantinople. They played a major part in Greece's independence. They were Phanariots. He married Smaragda Spiropoulou. Fokion was a mineralogist and Minister of Finance. His second son Theodoros became a prominent mathematician. Konstantinos completed his basic education in Chios. He studied with Neophytos Vambas. During the onset of the Greek revolution, the young seventeen-year-old Konstantinos traveled to Greece with his family and participated in the Greek War of Independence. He fought in many battles. He was captured by the Ottoman Turks. Luckily, he was released in Constantinople due to his high-ranking status. Alexandros Mavrokordatos insisted on the continuation of his education. He sent him to finish high school and higher education in Paris, France. Konstantinos attended the prestigious French university known as the École Polytechnique. He studied mathematics and physics. Greek physicist Dimitrios Stroumpos also attended the school around the same period. Konstantinos was exposed to the works of Gaspard Monge, Adrien-Marie Legendre, and Jean Nicolas Pierre Hachette.

Konstantino’s first cousin Alexander Negris traveled to the United States. He taught at Harvard. He was the first lecturer of Modern Greek at Harvard University in 1828. He also published the first-ever grammar of the modern Greek language in the United States. Konstantinos returned to Greece during the mid-1830s. He became one of the first professors at the University of Athens. He taught physics and mathematics. In his autographed letter to the Secretary of Education on July 21, 1836, he proposed to teach descriptive geometry. He used five books written by Legendre. Legendre's Elements of geometry, Legendre's rectilinear trigonometry, the general properties of numbers, algebra, and Hachette's descriptive geometry. He also taught differential and integral calculus. His lectures on descriptive geometry focused on the intersections of second-degree surfaces and three-dimensional analytic geometry. He taught binomial theorem. The applied mathematics taught in early Greek education was used for civil engineering, astronomy, mechanics, architecture, fortification, and navigation. He helped Greek mathematician Ioannis Papadakis study abroad. There was extensive political uncertainty in the newly established monarchy.

In the year 1843, in the month of September, the people were unsatisfied with the foreign monarch chosen to lead the new nation. They led an insurrection called the Revolution of September 3, 1843. The people obtained a constitutional monarchy. Every foreign professor was expelled from the university in favor of Greek professors. Konstantinos, Xaver Landerer, Karl Nikolas Fraas, Friedrich Zentner, Charles Laurent, Christian Hansen, and Theophil Hansen were all expelled. Within one year most of the faculty were rehired. Konstantinos was rehired within several months. He stopped teaching in 1845 and continued to assist the newly founded Greek state diplomatically. He traveled all over the world. By 1848, Konstantinos participated in the debate regarding the Greek monetary crisis. He actively worked to reduce the homeless problem in Athens. During the 1860s the bourgeoisie of Athens including Konstantinos created The Merciful Company of Athens (Ελεήμονα Εταιρεία Αθηνών). He was the vice president. He participated in the Greek elections of 1869 on an independent platform. He was opposed to the universal suffrage movement of the 1860s. He supported moderate modernization.

== Bibliography ==
- Volkert, Klaus; Menghini, Marta; Barbin, Évelyne (2019). Descriptive Geometry, The Spread of a Polytechnic Art The Legacy of Gaspard Monge. Cham, Switzerland: Springer International Publishing. ISBN 9783030148089.
- Ricks, David; Beaton, Roderick (2016). The Making of Modern Greece Nationalism, Romanticism, and the Uses of the Past (1797–1896). Burlington, VT: Ashgate Publishing Limited. ISBN 9781317024729.
- Stefanidou, Micheal K. (1952). Εθνικόν και Καποδιστριακόν Πανεπιστήμιον Αθηνών Εκατονταετηρίς 1837-1937 Ιστορία της Φυσικομαθηματικής Σχολής [National and Kapodistrian University of Athens Centenary 1837-1937 History of the Faculty of Physics and Mathematics] (PDF). Athens, Greece: National and Kapodistrian University of Athens.
- Layton, Evro (1990). Five Centuries of Books and Manuscripts in Modern Greek: A Catalogue of an Exhibition at the Houghton Library, December 4, 1987, through February 17, 1988. Cambridge, MA: The Harvard College Library. ISBN 9780974396354.
- Papastefanaki, Leda (2016). Mining Engineers, Industrial Modernization and Politics in Greece, 1870-1940 (PDF). Athens, GR: The Historical Review/La Revue Historique v. XIII.
