= Markos Stefanidis =

Greek footballer

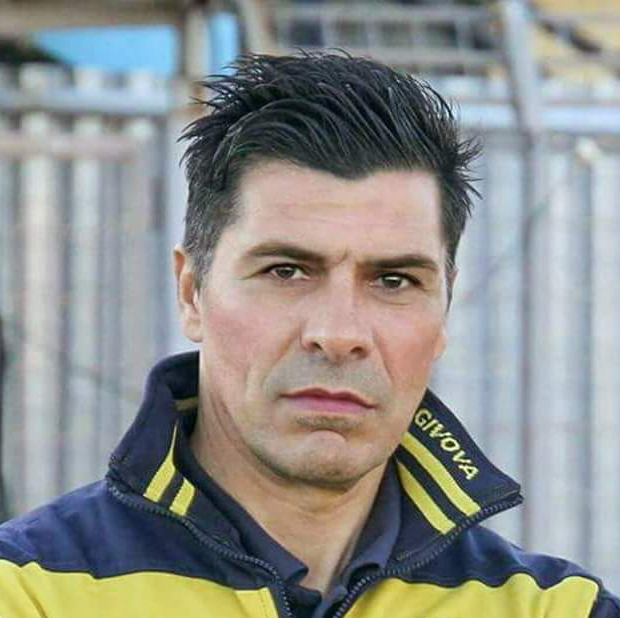

Personal information
- Date of birth: 3 April 1967 (age 59)
- Place of birth: Athens, Greece
- Height: 1.81 m (5 ft 11 in)

Managerial career
- Years: Team
- 2014–2015: AO Chania
- 2016–2017: Ialysos
- 2017–2018: Zakynthos
- 2017–2018: Kalamata
- 2017–2018: Sparta
- 2018–2019: Ialysos
- 2018–2019: Episkopi
- 2019–2020: Aittitos Spata
- 2019–2020: Tilikratis
- 2021–2022: Diavolitsi
- 2022–2023: Ermionida
- 2023–2024: Episkopi
- 2024–2025: Agios Nikolaos
- 2025: Ilioupoli
- 2026: Tilikratis
- 2026: AER Afantou

Markos Stefanidis (Greek: Μάρκος Στεφανίδης; born 3 April 1967) is a Greek professional football manager and former player.

== Coaching Diplomas ==
Year	Diploma	Result
2006	Novisad School of Soccer Coaches	Done
2007	UEFA B Licence	Done
2009	UEFA A Licence	Done
2020	UEFA Pro Licence	Pending

== Honours ==
=== Player ===
AO Kosmos VP

- Hellenic Futsal Super League: 1998–99
- Hellenic Futsal Super League 2: 2002–03

=== Manager ===
Kalamata

- Κύπελλο Ε.Π.Σ. Μεσσηνίας: 2017-18

Episkopi

- Κύπελλο Ε.Π.Σ. Ρεθύμνου: 2018–19
