= Georgios Konstantinos Vouris =

Greek astronomer, physicist and mathematician

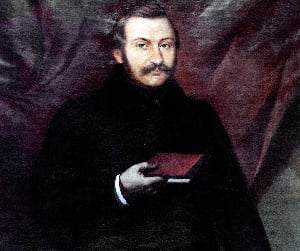
- Born: 20 July 1802; Vienna, Austria
- Died: 16 July 1860 (aged 57); Vienna, Austria
- Education: University of Vienna
- Known for: National Observatory of Athens
- Scientific career
- Fields: Astronomy, Physics, Mathematics
- Workplaces: University of Vienna, University of Athens
- Doctoral advisors: Joseph Johann von Littrow, Andreas von Ettingshausen
- Notable students: Vassilios Lakon

Georgios Konstantinos Vouris (Greek: Γεώργιος Κωνσταντίνου Βούρης; (1802–1860) aka Georg Konstantin Bouris was an ethnic Greek astronomer, physicist, mathematician, author, and professor. He lived in the Austrian Empire and in Greece. Vouris lobbied tirelessly to create an astronomical observatory in Athens. He was the first director of the National Observatory of Athens. It was completed in 1846. He was the first author to publish a university textbook in the field of mathematics since the inception of the new country.

He was born in Vienna to Greek parents. He studied astronomy and mathematics with some of the most important scientists of the time namely Andreas von Ettingshausen and Joseph Johann von Littrow. He did significant research in the fields of astrophysics, astronomy, geodesy, meteorology, number theory, calculus, and probability theory. He moved to Greece and stayed in the country for sixteen years before moving back to Vienna where he lived out the rest of his life. He played a significant role in the founding of the physics and mathematics department at the University of Athens. He did significant research on the elliptical orbital calculations of Biela's Comet. He died at the age of 57 on 16 July 1860, in Vienna. He is buried in the city.

== Early life ==
He was born in Vienna, Austria. His father was an entrepreneur. His father was from Ioannina and his mother was from Macedonia. His father was Greek and enthusiastic about his heritage. Georgios attended school in Vienna. He enrolled at the University of Vienna in 1820. He was eighteen years old. He initially studied philosophy and law. He earned a scholarship due to his exceptional performance as a student. He was unhappy with philosophy and law and pursued astronomy and mathematics instead. He was taught by Austrian scientist and astronomer Joseph Johann von Littrow. He was also affiliated with Austrian mathematician and physicist Andreas von Ettingshausen. He interacted with some of the most brilliant minds of the Austrian scientific community at the time.

Georgios eventually became a teacher at the Greek school in Vienna from 1826 to 1836. He continued his studies at the Vienna Observatory under the supervision of Joseph Johann von Littrow. He was his doctoral student. In 1832 Georgios published Elliptical orbit calculation of Biela's Comet from 96 observations of the year 1832 (Elliptische bahnbere chung des Biela'schen cometen aus 96 beobachtungen des Jahres 1832). His paper was a comprehensive overview of the elliptical orbital calculations of Biela's Comet. Georgios eventually decided to return to Greece. He initially worked as a translator for the Austrian embassy. The University of Athens was founded in 1837 and he became a professor of astronomy, physics, and mathematics. Georgios also extensively contributed to meteorological observation since 1839. He published a book entitled Meteorological Observations performed in Athens from 1 November 1839 until 30 June 1842 in Athens around 1843. He was profound of the field of astronomy.

== National Observatory of Athens ==
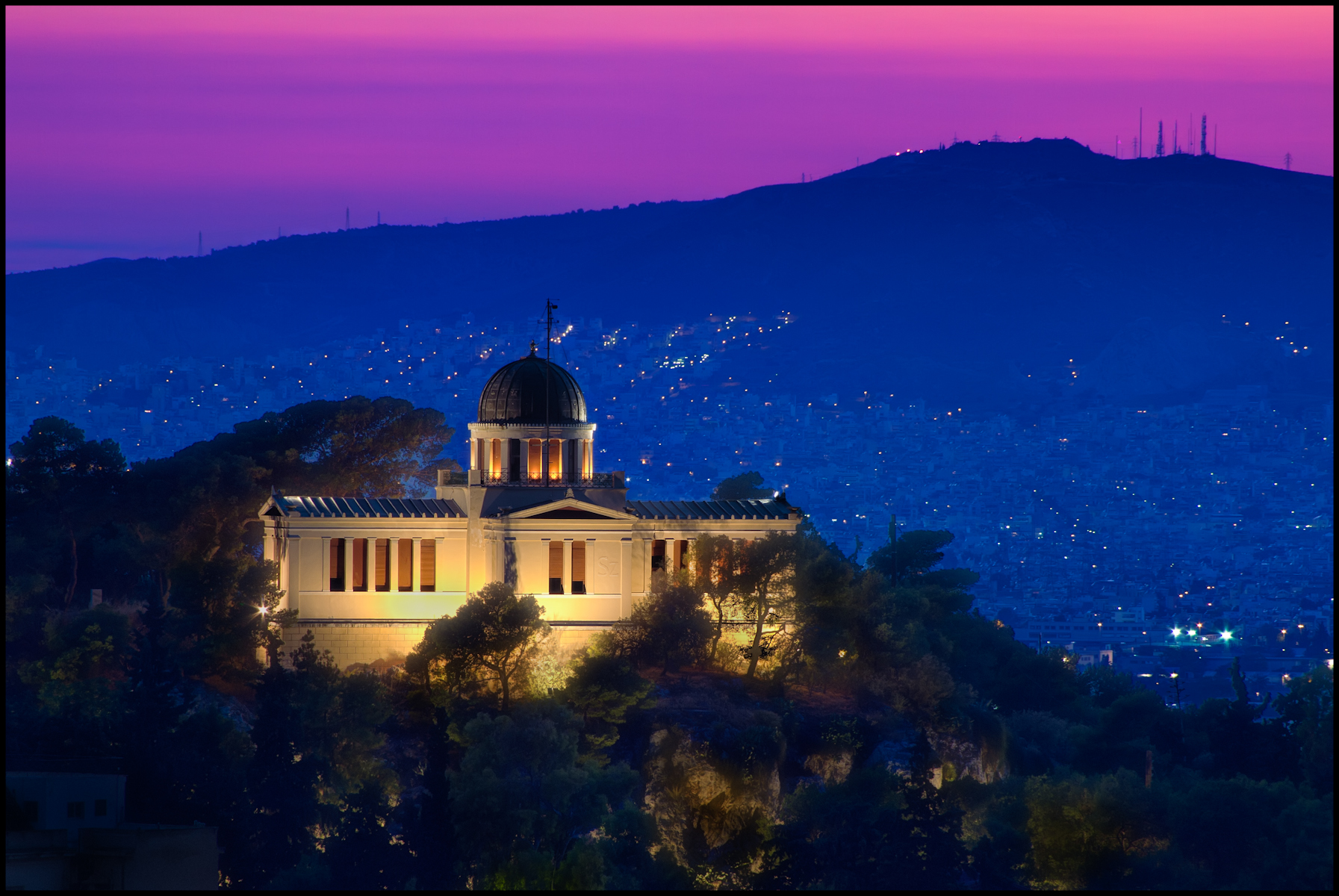
National Observatory of Athens

He lobbied to create the National Observatory of Athens. He convinced Greek-Austrian entrepreneur and banker Georgios Sinas to fund the massive observatory. When King Otto learned of the generosity he awarded Georgios Sinas's son the Order of the Redeemer. The King also chose the architects for the building under Georgio's supervision. He chose Eduard Schaubert and Theophil Hansen.

Vouris was responsible for selecting and purchasing the correct instruments for the newly founded Observatory. The instruments he chose were a refracting telescope 158 mm in diameter. It featured 6.2" (15.8-cm, 250 cm focal length, f/15) Plößl of Vienna. It was created by Simon Plössl. The second telescope was created by Christoph Starke of Vienna. He worked with optics by Fraunhofer of Munich. It was a meridional telescope 3.7" large (94mm, f/15, diameter 1m). Vouris also purchased two pendulums and a timer. Five small telescopes and a complete line of meteorological equipment. They were the most advanced scientific instruments of the time.

The foundation ceremony was on 26 June 1842. In a notable speech Georgios discussed Meton of Athens and his astronomical observatory that was in the same city over 2200 years before. The observatory was fully operational by 1846 and Georgios was the first director. He continued his scientific work in the field of astrophysics, astronomy, and geodesy. His articles were periodically published in Astronomische Nachrichten. He became internationally renowned in the field of astronomy.

The astronomer also did not publish several works. Some of the works included a catalog for the complete determination of 1000 stars peculiar to Greece and the position of the Athens Observatory. Georgios continued his scientific work. He determined the geographic coordinates of the Observatory, which formed the basis for the mapping of Greece. He also published a five-volume, complete system of mathematics under the title Mathematical Series. He did significant research on the movement of Sirius, Neptune, and Mars. He made specific observations of Mars with the Athens Meridian Circle. His research was used by American astronomer James Melville Gilliss.

== Later life and return to Austria ==
By the early 1850s, the popularity of the National Observatory of Athens declined, the young Greek state was unstable, and the National Observatory of Athens did not receive the funding it required. Georgios had conflicting views with the leaders of the University of Athens and Ministry of Education. Vouris fell ill in 1855, he decided to leave the National Observatory of Athens and return to Vienna. He was replaced by Ioannis Papadakis. Papadakis was the interim director for a short period of time and was replaced by Johann Friedrich Julius Schmidt.

Back in Vienna Georgios focused the remainder of his life on research. He continued writing and publishing articles in the field of astronomy. He was one of the most important Greek astronomers since antiquity. He published his Memoirs of the Athenian Observatory (Memoiren der Athenienser Sternwarte). He continued his research and made significant contributions to number theory, calculus, and probability theory. He significantly contributed to mathematics, physics, and astronomy. He died at the age of 57 on 16 July 1860. His unpublished work and library were sold to the observatory. His library consisted of 663 books and manuscripts and his unpublished works.

== Astronomical education 1550–1830 ==
Heliocentrism was forbidden by the Italian and Greek educational systems. Greek astronomers Chrysanthus Notaras and Methodios Anthrakites were required to follow the established education of the church instituted by Theophilos Corydalleus. Notaras's professor and advisor was Giovanni Domenico Cassini. Notaras worked with Cassini at the Paris observatory in the 1600s. The approved scientific education in the Greek world was secular in nature but promoted Aristotelian physics and the Ptolemaic astronomical system. The educational system known as Korydalism was the only approved education by the Catholic and Orthodox Church. Cesare Cremonini was part of the inquisition that persecuted Galileo Galilei. The church did not allow the idea of Heliocentrism. The idea was reintroduced by Galileo Galilei and discovered by Aristarchus of Samos. Both Aristotle and Ptolemy accepted the geocentric model. Cesare Cremonini was Theophilos Corydalleus's doctoral advisor and professor. Books by Galileo Galilei were on the forbidden books list until the late 1700s. Notaras built astronomical instruments but did not add Heliocentrism to his book. He added pictures that some scholars argue are a secret representation of the system. Vouris and his contemporaries mark a new era in Greece's astronomical education.

== Literary works ==
Books and Articles authored by Georgios Konstantinos Vouris
Date	Title	Title in English
1832	Elliptische Bahnberechnung des Biela'schen Cometen mit Berücksichtigung sämmtlicher Bahn-Elemente und unmittelbarer Benützung der beobachteten Rectascensionen und Declinationen, aus sechs und neunzig Beobachtungen des Jahres 1832	Elliptical calculation of the orbit of Biela's comet, taking into account all orbital elements and direct use of the observed rectascensions and declinations, from ninety-six observations of the year 1832
1852	Nachrichten von der Sternwarte Athen's nebst Beobachtungen der Irene	News from the Observatory in Athens together with Observations of the asteroid Irene
1854	Die Opposition des Mars im Jahre 1849–50 nach Beobachtungen an der Sternwarte Athen's, nebst Bemerkungen über den Durchmesser des Mars	The Οpposition of Mars in the Υears 1849–50 from Οbservations at the Οbservatory of Athens, with remarks on the Diameter of Mars
1854	Ueber die Sirius-Tage	Extensive Study of Sirius
1859	Nachrichten von der Sternwarte Athen's vormal. Director der Sternwarte und Professor an der Universität zu Athen	Memoirs from my Time at the Athens Observatory

== See also ==
- Timoleon Argyropoulos

== Bibliography ==
- Theodossiou, E.Th.; Manimanis, V.N.; Mantarakis, P. (2007). "Demetrios Eginitis Restorer of the Athens Observatory" (PDF). Journal of Astronomical History and Heritage. 10 (2): 123–132. Bibcode:2007JAHH...10..123T. doi:10.3724/SP.J.1440-2807.2007.02.05. ISSN 1440-2807. S2CID 129260817.
- Rhousopoulos, Athanasius Sergius (1857). Ὁδηγος των Φοιτητων του Πανεπιστημιου Ὀθωνος [Students and Faculty of the University of Athens Under King Otto]. Athens, Greece: Nikolaou Angelidou Publishing.
- Matsopoulos, Nicolas T. (2012). Η Συμβολή της Αστρονομίας στον Νεοελληνικό Διαφωτισμό - η ίδρυση του Αστεροσκοπείου Αθηνών [The Contribution of Astronomy to the Neo-Greek Enlightenment - The Foundation of the Athens Observatory]. Thessaloniki, Greece: Aristotle University of Thessaloniki Academy of Institutions and Cultures Society.
- Vlahakis, George N (2012). Early Attempts at Weather Prediction and Climate Description in 19th Century Greece. Athens, Greece: Institute for Neohellenic Research and the National Hellenic Research Foundation.
- Roubien, Denis (2017). Creating Modern Athens: A Capital Between East and West. New York, NY: Taylor & Francis. ISBN 9781351966177.
- Harvey, Stephen; Matsopoulos, Nicolas (2020). The Moon A Translation of Der Mond by Johann Friedrich Julius Schmidt. Horsham, United Kingdom: Springer. ISBN 978-3-030-37269-9.
- Gilliss, James Melville (1856). The U.S. Naval Astronomical Expedition to the Southern Hemisphere, During the Years 1849-52. Washington D.C.: United States Navy Department.
- Volkert, Klaus; Menghini, Marta; Barbin, Évelyne (2019). Descriptive Geometry, The Spread of a Polytechnic Art The Legacy of Gaspard Monge. Cham, Switzerland: Springer International Publishing. ISBN 9783030148089.
- Stefanidou, Micheal K. (1952). Εθνικόν και Καποδιστριακόν Πανεπιστήμιον Αθηνών Εκατονταετηρίς 1837-1937 Ιστορία της Φυσικομαθηματικής Σχολής [National and Kapodistrian University of Athens Centenary 1837–1937 History of the Faculty of Physics and Mathematics] (PDF). Athens, Greece: National and Kapodistrian University of Athens.
