= Anastasios Christomanos =

Greek chemist (1841–1906)

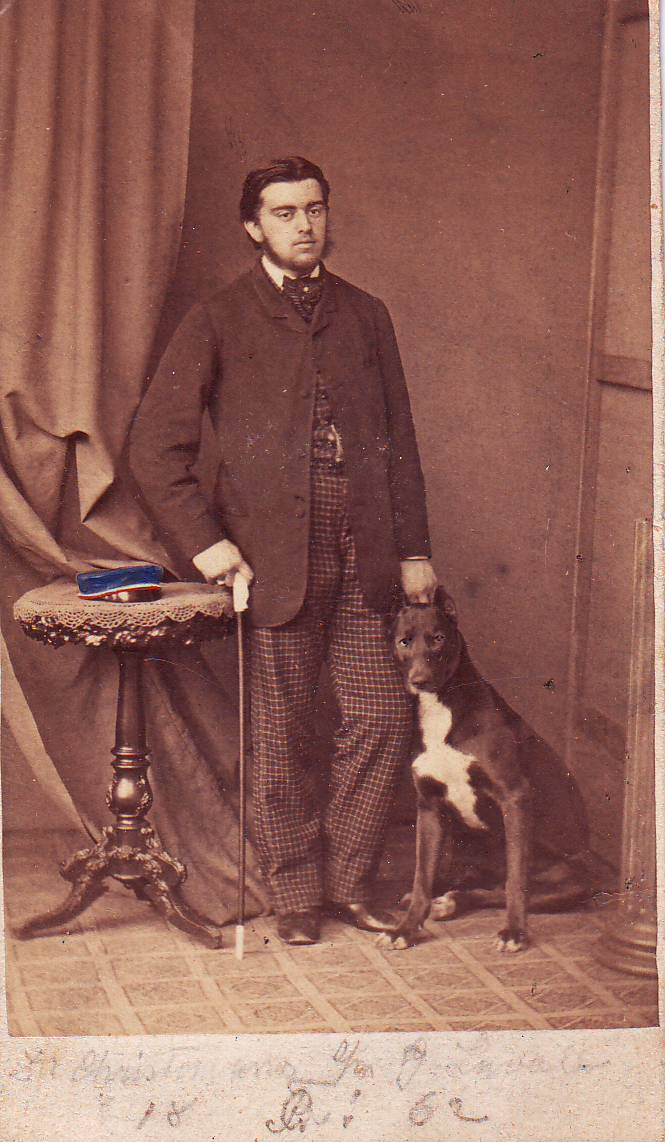
- Born: March 22, 1841; Vienna, Austrian Empire
- Died: October 2, 1906 (aged 65); Athens, Greece
- Education: TU Wien; University of Giessen; Heidelberg University
- Scientific career
- Fields: Inorganic Chemistry, Archaeometry, Analytical Chemistry, Organic Chemistry
- Workplaces: University of Athens
- Academic advisors: Robert Bunsen, Georg Ludwig Carius, Emil Erlenmeyer; Gustav Kirchhoff
- Notable students: Anastasios Damvergis

Anastasios Christomanos (Greek: Ἀναστάσιος Χρηστομάνος, March 22, 1841 – October 2, 1906) was a Greek chemist. He was one of the most important Greek scientists of the later part of the 19th century. His academic collaborators were some of the most important scientists in the world, including Robert Bunsen, Georg Ludwig Carius, Emil Erlenmeyer and Gustav Kirchhoff. He is the father of modern Greek chemical education. He wrote 73 books and dissertations. His fields of study included: Inorganic Chemistry, Organic Chemistry, and Analytical Chemistry. He helped restructure Greek education. Greek education was in the grasp of Korydalism for over 300 years. With the onset of the Industrial Revolution, Christomanos and his contemporaries were pioneers of modern education all over the world.

Christomanos was born in Vienna to a family that migrated from what is now Bulgaria. They were an important aristocratic Greek family, claiming roots in the Byzantine Empire. He showed an interest in science from an early age and was in Germany during the age of scientific revolution and discovery. He eventually became affiliated with the lab of Robert Bunsen. Bunsen was recruiting countless scientists to assist in his academic research. Christomanos was involved with Bunsen and his associates. He also worked at different chemical institutions. Around this period, Kirchhoff and Bunsen invented the spectroscope. Kirchhoff used the instrument to pioneer the identification of the elements in the Sun. In 1859, he showed that the Sun contained sodium. Kirchhoff and Bunsen discovered caesium and rubidium in 1861. In 1866, Christomanos brought the spectroscope to Greece and used the instrument on the island of Santorini to research the volcanic eruption of the Santorini caldera in 1866.

Christomanos continued to restructure the chemistry department at the University. He brought instrumentation from all over the world. With the onset of new research, the field of study became more popular towards the end of the 19th century. He implemented German educational standards. He brought the scientist Hans Max Jahn to the University of Athens. Christomanos' most important scientific work was the determination of the specific gravity of silver, methods for the determination of alkali metals, artificial biphenyl synthesis and the composition of chromite ores in Greece.

== Early life ==
Christomanos was born in Vienna. His father Konstantinos (1815-1861) was born in Meleniko, in what is now Bulgaria. At the age of eight, Konstantinos' family traveled to Vienna. He graduated from the School of Commerce, learned three languages and studied painting. Konstantinos married Maria Kazassi, in 1839. Her father was from Naousa, Greece and her mother was Austrian. Anastasios' parents moved to Greece in 1855, while Anastasios remained in Vienna to continue his studies. There he studied with notable Viennese scientist Franz Josef Pisko and Anton Schrötter von Kristelli. Anastasios' studies advanced very quickly he eventually was associated with Justus von Liebig and Robert Bunsen. In the late 1850s, Anastasios eventually participated in the lab experiments of Bunsen and Kirchhoff. He also worked in the chemical industry assisting factories in Moscow and Frankfort.

Heliocentrism was on the list of forbidden books until 1758. It was not acceptable as a physical fact until the middle to late part of the 19th century. Greek education was also restricted to Korydalism. The Methodios affair is an example of restrictive education until the middle part of the 1800s.

Scientific education was extremely unpopular across the world. Greek American naval artillery chemist and pyrotechnist George Marshall relayed the acceptable scientific education used by the U.S. Navy in his book Marshall's Practical Marine Gunnery in 1822. Newtonian physics was still not acceptable or recommended. A simple version of projectile motion was used instead. Chemical compounds were also called crude archaic names and the periodic table was not discovered. Chemistry research began to evolve during the latter part of the 19th century. Christomanos was one of the pioneers of modern chemistry in Greece.

== Chemistry in Greece ==
His contemporary in Greece was physicist Timoleon Argyropoulos. Anastasios Christomanos returned to Greece in 1862. He taught physics at the National School of Athens. The institution lacked the proper chemistry facilities. His predecessors were Francis Xaver Landerer and Alexander Venizelos. By the year 1863, he became a lecturer at the University. He founded a small chemistry laboratory in the basement of the university at his own expense. It was the first of its kind in Greece. He was the first Greek chemist to construct and implement Greek nomenclature for chemical processes and chemical compounds namely the new elements and procedures discovered by his academic professors and colleagues in Germany and other parts of the world.

In 1864, he published a book on analytical chemistry in Greece that was the first of its kind. Around this period Russian chemist Dmitri Mendeleev was constructing the periodic table. Christomanos was actively aware of the new advancement in the field of chemistry all over the world. Anastasios formulated the high school curriculum for Greek schools to mirror the education of chemistry in Germany. He taught classes in inorganic and organic chemistry. He organized the equipment and physical chemistry education at the Hellenic Military Academy. By the year 1866, he used his knowledge of advanced spectroscopy to study the newly erupted volcano in Santorini. In 1866, he obtained a full professorship at the University of Athens. Christomanos married Athena Lindermayer. She was the daughter of prominent Bavarian doctor Otto Von Lindermayer and Catherine Prokopiou Venizelos. They had five children, including Greek playwright Konstantinos Christomanos and Doctor Antonios Christomanos.

He was actively studying the chemical compounds in the Mines of Laurion. He discovered that the mineral Greenockite was present. By the 1870s the academic education of chemistry in Greece followed the German standard. Anastasios invited world-renowned German scientist Hans Max Jahn to teach in Athens. Jahn wanted to continue his research while teaching in Greece. He was the first chair of the chemistry department. After his third year, he resigned due to time constraints. He could not balance his research and the demands of the chemistry department. He continued his work in electrochemistry and other chemical processes.

== Later life and death ==
In 1883, Anastasios undertook the organization and supervision of the municipal lighting of Athens. During the 1880s, he continued expanding his laboratories. He added three new chemical facilities and the massive university laboratory on Solonos Street. They were all built under his supervision. By the 1890s another important Greek student of Robert Bunsen was affiliated with the chemistry department named Anastasios Damvergis. He worked with Christomanos. During his busy schedule, Christomanos also found time to communicate and stay active within the academic community of chemistry. He constantly attended conferences and scientific conventions all over the world.

By the mid-1890s Chrisomanos and professors Konstantinos Mitsopoulos, Timoleon Argyropoulos, Spyridon Miliarakis, Nikolaos Apostolides, and Anastasios Damvergis filed a memorandum to the Greek state. They proposed the formation of a school of Physics and Mathematics. They wanted to separate the Departments of Physics and Mathematics from the Philosophical School. The separation was finally accomplished by Royal Decree on June 3, 1904.

Christomanos' contributions to the field of chemistry included developing an apparatus for the estimation of carbonic anhydride. Christomanos also studied the indirect estimation of Calcium and Magnesium and the combustion of Magnesium. He also did extensive research on the magnesites of Greece. Christomanos also researched the preparation of Phosphorus Tribromide. He conducted countless research projects with different molecules, elements and compounds. He died in Athens on October 2, 1906, from kidney cancer. His children continued his legacy.

== Literary works ==
- Handbook of Chemistry
- Introduction to Chemistry (1871)
- To the knowledge of iodine trichloride; Athens 1877
- Analysis of chrome iron stone; Athens 1877
- Analysis Tables (Αναλυτικοί πίνακες), 1885
- Elements of Chemistry (for use in Education) Στοιχεία Χημείας (δια την εκπαίδευσιν), 1887
- Inorganic and Organic Chemistry, vol. I, (Ανόργανος και οργανική χημεία, τόμος Α΄), 1887
- Inorganic and Organic Chemistry, vol. II, (Ανόργανος και οργανική χημεία, τόμος Β΄), 1887
- Introduction to Chemistry, (Εισαγωγή εις την χημεία),1891

== See also ==
- Constantin Carathéodory

== Bibliography ==
- Tampakis, Costas (2021). Η Χημεία στην Ελλάδα και το γερμανικό παράδειγμα (1860–1904) [Chemistry in Greece and the German Example (1860–1904)]. Athens, GR: Compendium Summary of the Greek-German crossroads.
- Savaidou, Irini Mergoupi (2010). Δημόσιος Λόγος περί Επιστήμης στην Ελλάδα, 1870–1900: Εκλαϊκευτικά Εγχειρήματα στο Πανεπιστήμιο Αθηνών, στους Πολιτιστικούς Συλλόγους και στα Περιοδικά [Public Discourse about Science in Greece, 1870-1900: Population Projects at the University of Athens, in Cultural Associations and Magazines] (PDF). Athens, GR: Department of History and Philosophy of Science of the University of Athens.
- Stefanidis, Michail K. (1952). Εθνικόν και Καποδιστριακόν Πανεπιστήμιον Αθηνών Εκατονταετηρίς 1837-1937. Τόμος Ε′, Ιστορία της Φυσικομαθηματικής Σχολής [National and Kapodistrian University of Athens Centenary 1837-1937. Volume V, History of the Faculty of Physics and Mathematics] (PDF). Athens: National and Kapodistrian University of Athens.
