= Nikolaos Ch. Nikolaidis =

Greek mathematician (1826–1889)

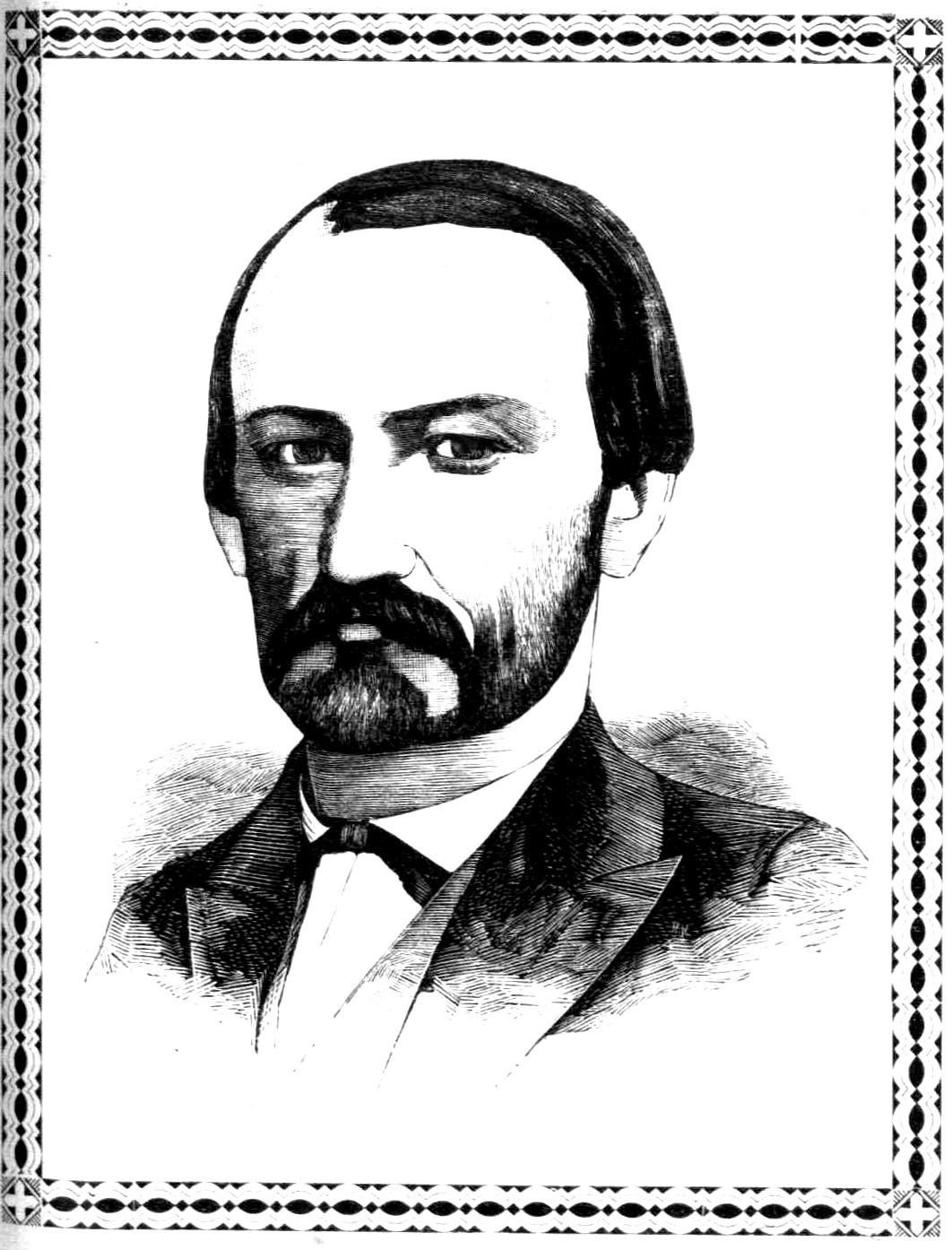
- Born: 1826; Tripoli, Greece
- Died: 11 July 1889 (aged 62–63); Athens, Greece
- Education: Evelpidon; École nationale des ponts et chaussées École polytechnique
- Scientific career
- Fields: Mathematics; Differential geometry
- Workplaces: University of Athens; Evelpidon
- Doctoral advisors: Joseph Bertrand
- Doctoral students: Cyparissos Stephanos

Nicolaos Ch. Nikolaidis (Greek: Νικόλαος Χ. Νικολαΐδης, in French Nicolas Nicolaïdès; (1826 – 11 July 1889) was an author, mechanical engineer, mathematician, soldier, and professor. He was a pioneer in 19th-century Greek mathematics introducing modern European mathematics to the Greek world. He went to school at Evelpidon and studied in France at the École nationale des ponts et chaussées and École polytechnique. His professors in France included Joseph Bertrand and Adhémar Jean Claude Barré de Saint-Venant. While in France he was exposed to the complex mathematics prevalent at the time. He wrote papers on geometry and kinematics. He was exposed to the works of Jacques Charles François Sturm, Giovanni Fagnano, Colin Maclaurin, Joseph Bertrand, and Jacques Antoine Charles Bresse. He integrated some of their works into his mathematical literature. He participated in the Cretan revolt in 1866 and was the Commander of the 174th Battalion of Verville during the Franco-Prussian War in 1870. He became a professor at University of Athens in 1871. His memoirs, a work of over four hundred pages entitled Analectes, ou Mémoires et Notes sur les Diverses Parties des Mathématiques published in 1874, feature most of his mathematical papers. By 1881, he retired from the University of Athens due to an illness. He died on 11 July 1889, at about 63 years old. He influenced countless French and Greek mathematicians, including Cyparissos Stephanos, John Hazzidakis and Vassilios Lakon.

== Biography ==
Nikolaidis was born in 1826 in Tripoli. His father, Christodoulos, was a member of an old Greek aristocratic family. Christodoulos migrated to Switzerland from Philippopolis. The family eventually settled in the Peloponnese region of Greece around the time of the Greek War of Independence. From a young age, Nikolaidis exhibited a high level of intelligence. He attended Greece's elite military school known as Evelpidon, graduating with honors. The Greek government sent him to Paris on a scholarship to study with the most brilliant minds of the time. He studied at the École nationale des ponts et chaussées and the École polytechnique. His professor at the École polytechnique was Joseph Bertrand. His classmates at the time were Henri Brocard and Émile Lemoine. His professor at the École nationale des ponts et chaussées was mechanician and mathematician Adhémar Jean Claude Barré de Saint-Venant. Nikolaidis taught civil engineering and mathematics in France. He was also affiliated with Charles Hermite, Jacques Antoine Charles Bresse, and Léon Foucault. He had an academic disagreement with Bresse and Foucault, publishing his responses in the French magazine Cosmos. He abandoned his teaching position at the École nationale des ponts et chaussées because of his disagreement with Bresse. In 1863, Nikolaidis published Théorie du Mouvement d'une Figure Plane dans son Plan Application aux Organes des Machines and in 1864 he published his dissertation, Mémoire Sur la Théorie Générale des Surfaces. By 1865, he had two Phds. That same year he returned to Greece and became an instructor at Evelpidon. Around the same period at 40 years of age, he fought on the side of Crete during the Cretan revolt in 1866, and subsequently fought on the side of France in the Franco-Prussian War in 1870, commanding the 174th Battalion of Verville. When he returned to Greece he became a professor at the University of Athens in 1871. Three years later he published an accumulation of his complex mathematical work in French entitled Analectes, ou Mémoires et Notes sur les Diverses Parties des Mathématiques. Around this period he taught Cyparissos Stephanos, inspiring the young mathematician. By 1881, he retired from teaching at the University of Athens due to an illness. He was about fifty-five years old. He died eight years later at the age of sixty-three. He was a member of several organizations including an organization for the encouragement of Greek studies in France.

== Mémoire Sur la Théorie Générale des Surfaces ==
Articles in Mémoire Sur la Théorie Générale des Surfaces
Number	Title	Title in English
I	Mémoire sur le Mouvement d'un Point Matériel. Sur la Théorie des Surfaces.	Memoir on the Movement of a Material Point. On the Theory of Surfaces.
II	Note sur la Théorie des Nombres. Sur la Movement d'un Point Matériel. Sur Quelques Articles des Annales des Mathématiques.	Notes on Number Theory and the Movement of a Material Point. Articles on the History of Mathematics.
III	Théorie du Mouvement d'une Figure Plane Dans son Plan. Application aux Organes des Machines.	Theory of Motion of a Plane Figure in its Plane. Application to Machine Components.
IV	Problèmes de Géométrie.	Geometry Problems.
V	Généralisation d'un Théorème de M. Betrand. Sur les podaires et les arcs plans.	Generalization of a Theorem of Joseph Bertrand. On footings and flat arches.
VI	Théorème de Fagnano, formule de M. Grunert. Nouvelle Propriété d'un Système des Conques Homofocales. Théorèmes de M. M. Charles et Kupper. Représentation Géometrique de l'intégrale d'Euler.	Fagnano's theorem, Formula of Johann August Grunert. New Property of a System of Homofocal Conchas. Theorems of Charles and Kupper. Geometric Representation of Euler's integral.
VII	Sur l'Intégration des Équations Linéaires.	Integration of Linear Equations.
VIII	Sur les Développées Successives des Courbes des Planes.	The Successive Developments on the Curves of Planes.
IX	Sur les Développées Successives des Courbes des Planes (suite). Nouvelles Propriétés du Mouvement d'un Point Matériel. Note sur la Théorie des Caustiques, Relation Entre les Rayons de Courbure de la Caustique et de l'Anticaustique; Formules Diverses; Centre de Jonction.	The Successive Developments of the Curves on Planes (continued). New motion Properties of a Material Point. Notes on the theory of Caustics, Relation Between the Radii of Curvature of the Caustic and the Anticaustic; various formulas; Junction Center.
X	Transformation des Courbes et des Surfaces. Transformation des Courbes à Double Courbure par la Mèthode des Rayons Vecteurs Rèciproques. Transformation de Surfaces.	Transformation of Curves and Surfaces. Transformation of Double Curvature Curves by the Method of Reciprocal Radii Vectors. Surface Transformation.
XI and XII	Surfaces polaires. Sur les elements d'une substitution orthogonale ternaire. Sur le mouvement d'un quadrilatère articule; coulisse de Stephenson, parallélogramme de Watt. Sur les équations fondamentales des surfaces; formes de ces équations lorsque les deus systèmes de lignes que l'on considère se coupent sous un angle variable. Cas particuliers; équations de M. Bonnet, de M. Codazzi, de Lamé, de Bour.	Polar surfaces. The Elements of a Ternary Orthogonal Substitution. The Motion of an Articulated Quadrilateral; Robert Stephenson's slide, James Watt's parallelogram. Fundamental Equations of Surfaces; Forms of these Equations when the two Systems of Lines under Consideration Intersect at a Variable Angle. Special cases; Equations of Pierre Ossian Bonnet, Delfino Codazzi, Gabriel Lamé and Edmond Bour.
XIII and XIV	Forme Definitive des Equations Fondamentales des Surfaces. Applications Diverses. Enveloppe d'une Droite. Mouvement des Polygones Articulés. Mémoire sur les Surfaces Orthogonales.	The Definitive form of Fundamental Equations of Surfaces. Various Applications. Envelope of a Line. Movement of Articulated Polygons. Notes on Orthogonal Surfaces.
XV	Mémoire sur les Surfaces Orthogonales (Suite). Cas Particuliers. Transformation des Formules en Coordonnèes Polaires; Nouveaux Systèmes. Autre Transformation; Nouveaux Systèmes.	Notes on Orthogonal surfaces (continued). Special cases. Transformation of Formulas into Polar Coordinates; New Systems and Processes.
XVI	Note au Sujet du Mémoire qui Précède (Surfaces Orthogonales). Sur le Mouvement des Polygones Plans et Sphériques. Théorèmes sur le Pentagone, sur l'Hexagone, etc. Théorèmes de Cinématique. Sur le Mouvement d'un Point Matériel. Sur les Surfaces à Courbure Moyenne Constante.	Note on the above Memoir (orthogonal surfaces). On the Movement on a Plane and Spherical Polygons. Theorems on the Pentagon, Hexagon, etc. Kinematics Theorems. On the Movement of a Material Point. On Surfaces with Constant Mean Curvature.
XVII	Sur les Surfaces Réglées. Cas Particuliers. Lignes Tracées sur les Surfaces Réglées. Sur Quelques Courbes Gauches.	Ruled Surface Special cases. Lines drawn on Ruled Surfaces. Left curves.

== Literary works ==
Books and Articles authored by Nikolaos X. Nikolaidis
Date	Title	Title in English
1863	Théorie du Mouvement d'une Figure Plane dans son Plan Application aux Organes des Machines	The Theory of Motion of a Plane Figure and its Application to Machine Parts
1864	Mémoire Sur la Théorie Générale des Surfaces	Dissertation on the General Theory of Surfaces
1874	Analectes, ou Mémoires et Notes sur les Diverses Parties des Mathématiques	The Analecta or Notes and Memoirs on Mathematical Subjects

== See also ==
- Stephenson valve gear
- Watt steam engine

== Bibliography ==
- Asimakopoulou, F.; Chatzis, Kostas (2008). Σπουδαστές στη Γαλλία, Μηχανικοί στην Ελλάδα. Ο Κόσμος των Ελλήνων Μηχανικών, 19ος - 20ου αιώνα [Greek Scientists that Studied in France from 1800-1900] (PDF). Athens, Greece: University of Athens.
- Stefanidou, Micheal K. (1952). Εθνικόν και Καποδιστριακόν Πανεπιστήμιον Αθηνών Εκατονταετηρίς 1837-1937 Ιστορία της Φυσικομαθηματικής Σχολής [National and Kapodistrian University of Athens Centenary 1837-1937 History of the Faculty of Physics and Mathematics] (PDF). Athens, Greece: National and Kapodistrian University of Athens.
- Gerono, Camille-Christophe; Brisse, Charles (1875). Nouvelles Annales de Mathématiques, Journal des Candidats Aux Ècoles Spéciales, á la Licence et á l'Agrégation [New Annals of Mathematics, Journal of Candidates for Special Schools, License and Aggregation]. Paris, France: Ècole Polytechnique.
- Moigno, L'Abbe (1875). Les Mondes Revue Hebdomadaire des Sciences et Leurs Applications Aux Arts et à l'industrie Volume 7 [Les Mondes Weekly Review of Sciences and Their Applications to Arts and Industry Volume 7]. Paris, France: Etienne Giraud Library Editors.
- Bourquin, E. J. (1881). Annuaire De L'Association Pour L'Encouragment Des Ètudes Grecques En France [Directory of the Association for the Encouragement of Greek Studies in France]. Paris, France: Maisonneuve Library Editors.
