= Côte d'amour =

Northwestern Atlantic coast of Pays de la Loire, France

Coordinates: 47.29°N 2.36°W

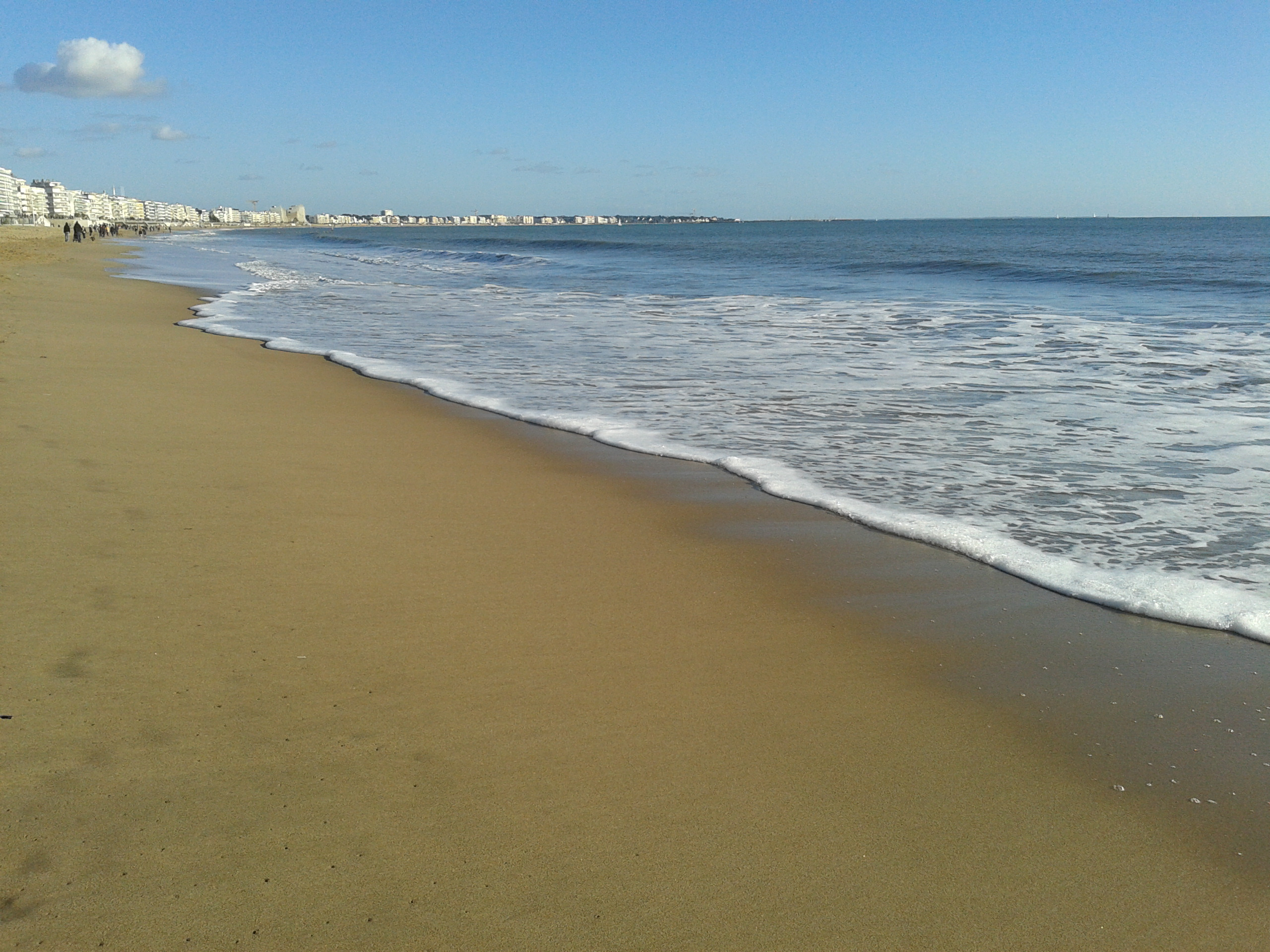
La Baule-Escoublac beach

Location of Côte d'Amour in Pays de la Loire

The Côte d'Amour (French pronunciation: [kot damuʁ], literally Coast of Love; Breton: Arvor ar garantez) is a name given to part of the north western Atlantic coast of the Pays de la Loire region in France. It runs from Le Traict de Pen Bé to the mouth of the Loire in Saint-Nazaire, both of which are in the Loire-Atlantique department.

The coastline includes the peninsula of Guérande (in French "Presqu'île de Guérande", including the following localities and seaside resorts from south to north: Saint-Nazaire, Pornichet, La Baule-Escoublac, Le Pouliguen, Le Croisic, Batz-sur-Mer, Guérande, La Turballe, Piriac-sur-Mer and Mesquer.

== Etymology ==
In 1913, the newspaper La Mouette organised an opinion poll to give a name to the shore and that is when it became "La Côte d'Amour". Despite popular assumptions, the name is not related to sex.

== History ==
Until the 19th century, the area contained two small fishing ports: Pornichet in the east and Le Pouliguen in the west. They were separated by a large sand stretch called La Bôle.

The local economy was fueled by two industries. The first was fishing and seaweed collecting; seaweed would be used as a fertiliser called "Goémon". The second was salt extraction from the local salt evaporation ponds (French: marais salants). These economic activities declined around the 18th century, causing large sandbanks to form and salt marshes to drain.

Le Pouliguen was a home to big boats and was known for cod fishing. It was the main point of transport to Nantes. A naval building site was established in the city.

=== Development ===
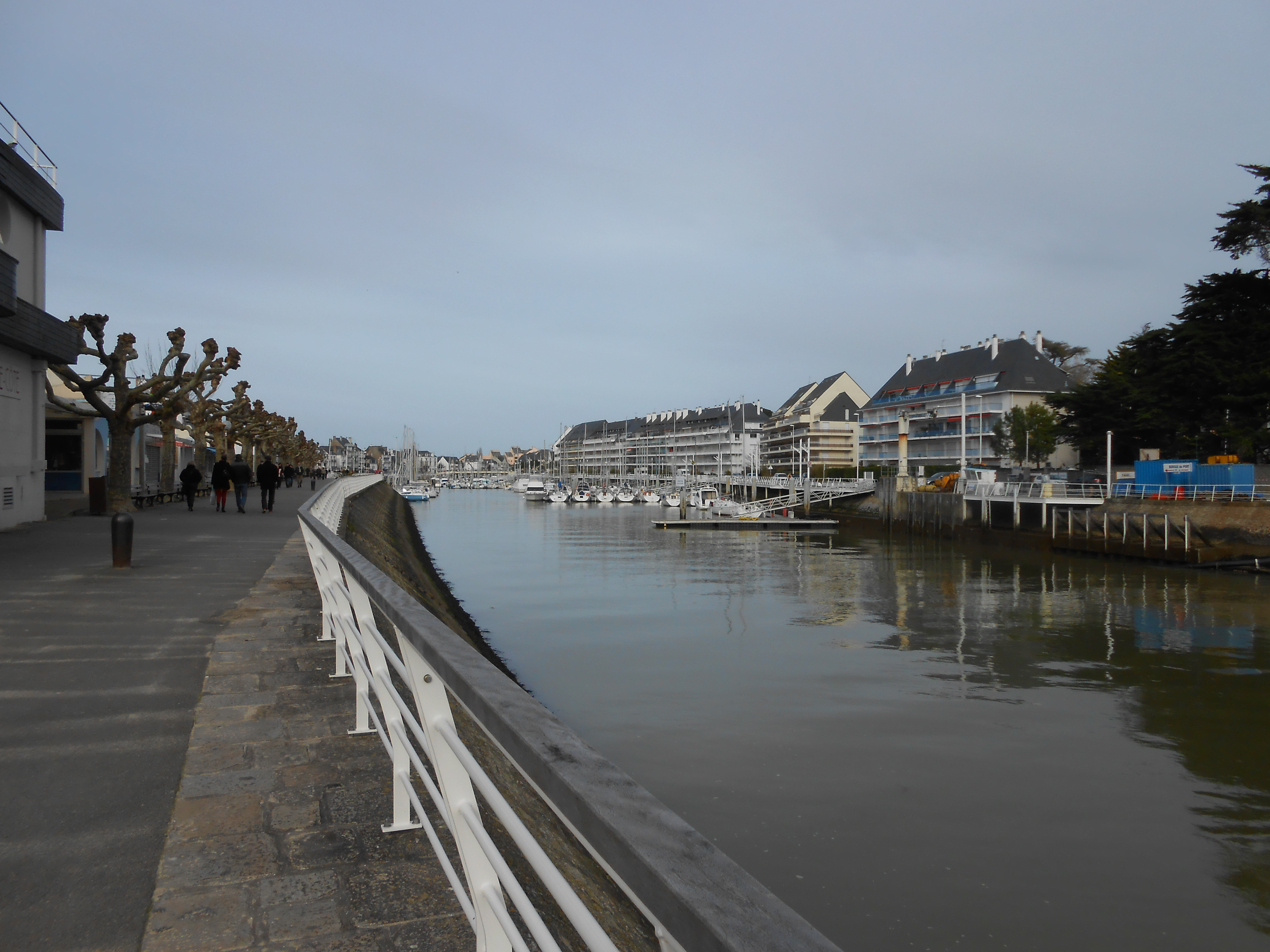
Le Pouliguen today

In light of the emergence of new innovations, a group of constructors transformed the sandbank into a forest. The climate evolved and became a microclimate unique to the Côte d'Amour due to this new ecosystem. Another factor in the coastline's transformation was the extension of the railway from Saint-Nazaire to Pornichet in 1879 by the engineer Antoine de la Perrière.

Investors saw potential in La Bôle and its surrounding villages, believing its microclimate would attract tourists if better advertised. With the help of Georges Lafont, an architect from Nantes, La Bôle was developed into a town with what is now the De Gaulle avenue running through it, which is perpendicular to the sea and links to the station. They also constructed a sea boulevard, parallel to the sea, that linked the three seaside stations of the shore: Le Pouliguen, La Bôle and Pornichet.

When the railway arrived to all three stations and the coast was ready to open in 1887, the name of La Bôle was changed to Escoublac-La Baule and later La Baule-Escoublac. This was to preserve the name of the original village, Escoublac, which was previously next to the sandbank. Local and tourism development continued into the 20th century.

== Today ==
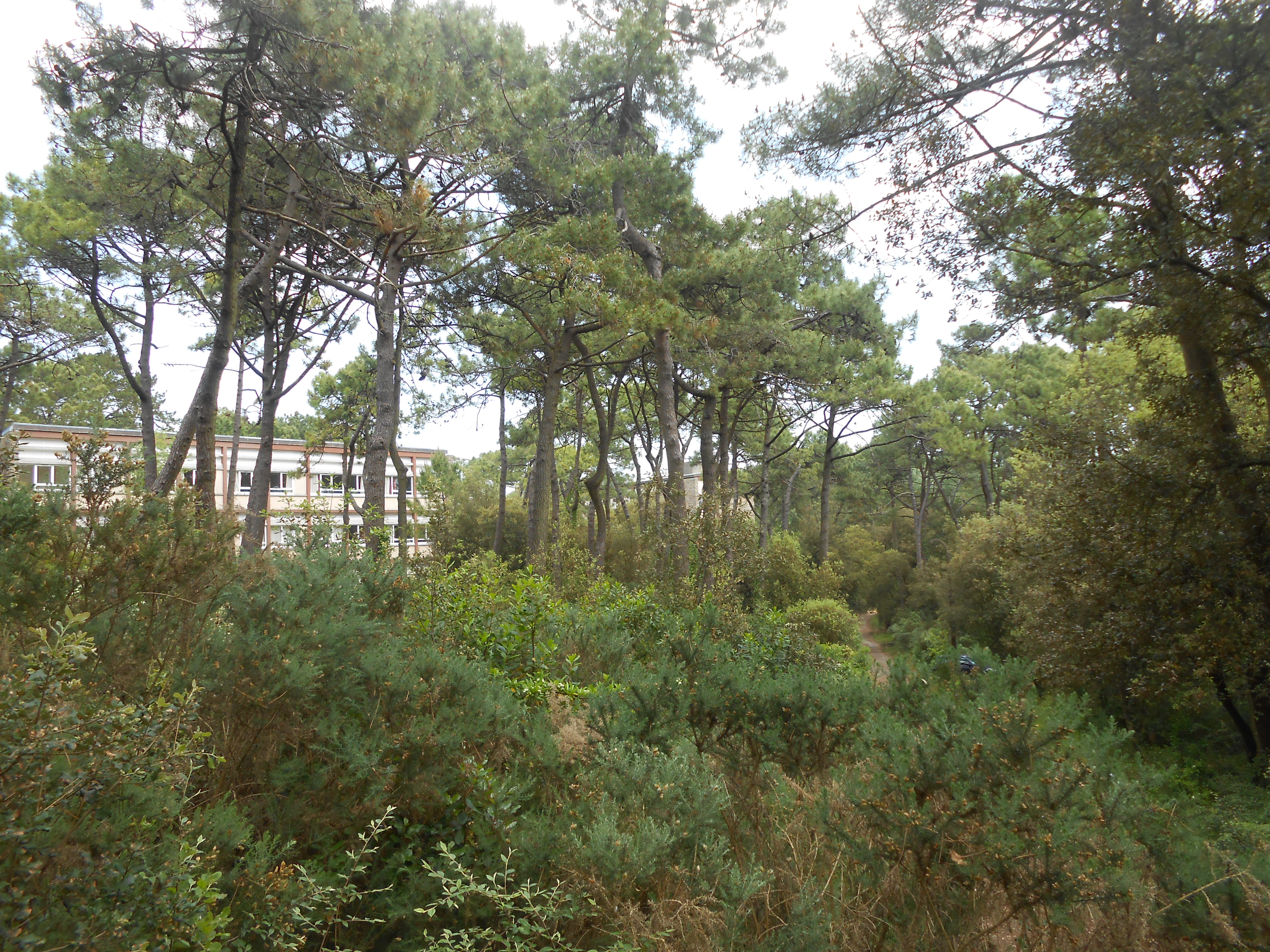
Forest of La Baule and Grand Air High School behind

The whole coastline is frequented by tourists, especially from April to October. It is characterised by its nature, its seaside resorts and sea-related activities.

La Baule is referred to as a "Garden-city". The aim is to preserve the original architectural structure and nature of the city, for it to continue being a city in a forest in front of the sea.

All three stations are home to several businesses, particularly those concerning water-regarding activities and sports. Equestrian centres are also found in the area.

== Festivals and events ==
There is a year-round weekly local market in each of the local communities.

During winter at the Bois des Aulnes (English: alders forest), there is a family Christmas event called Noël Magique (English: Magical Christmas).

La Baule Jumping Competition, an international equestrian competition, is held over the course of three days in May at the François André stadium.

La Baule Jazz Festival takes place in the summer. At the same time, Le Pouliguen (Breton: Ar Poulwenn) festival is held in July where more than 300 musicians and performers participate.

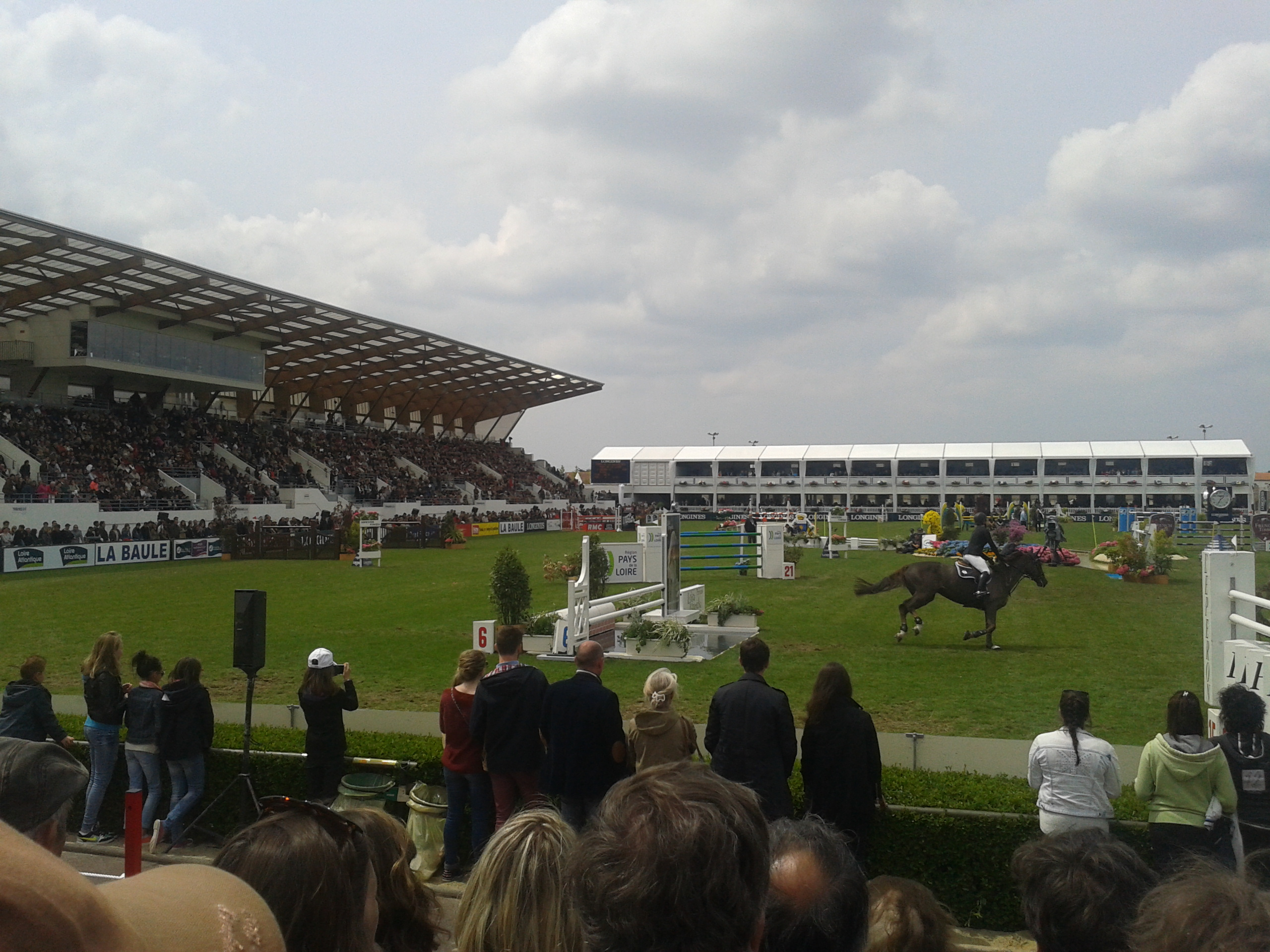
"Le Jumping de La Baule" equestrian competition

== Gallery ==
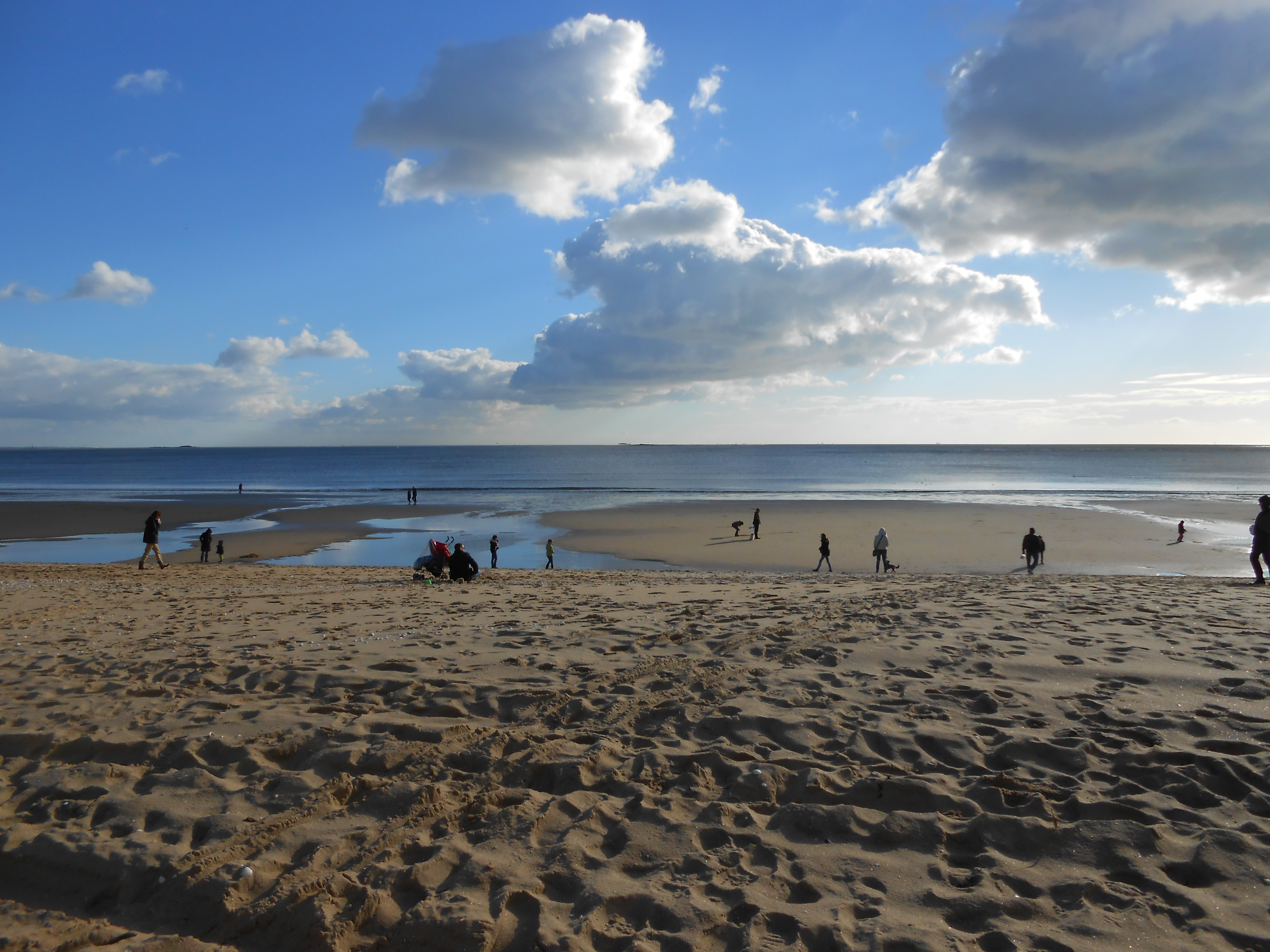
Beach

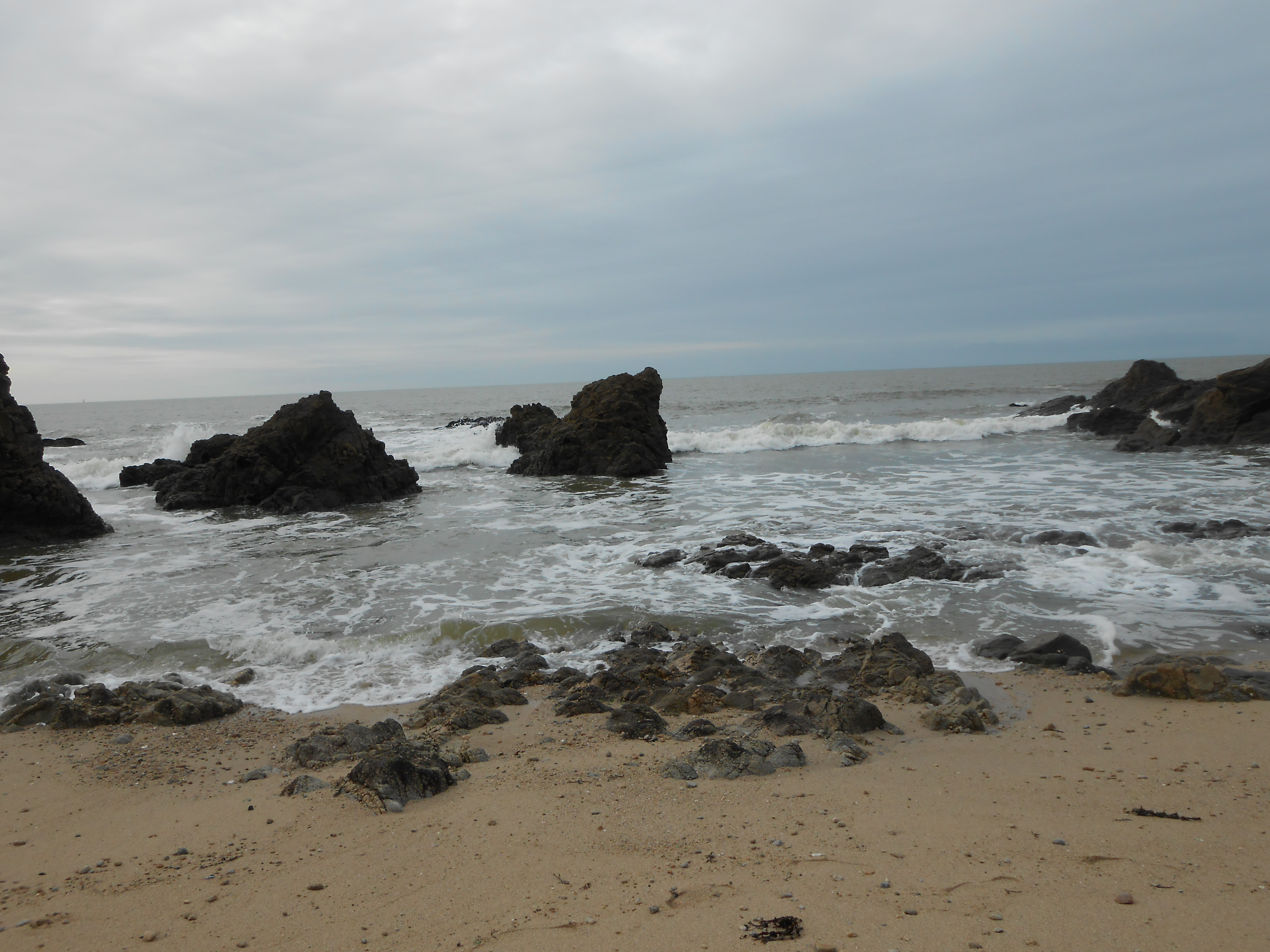
Near Le Pouliguen

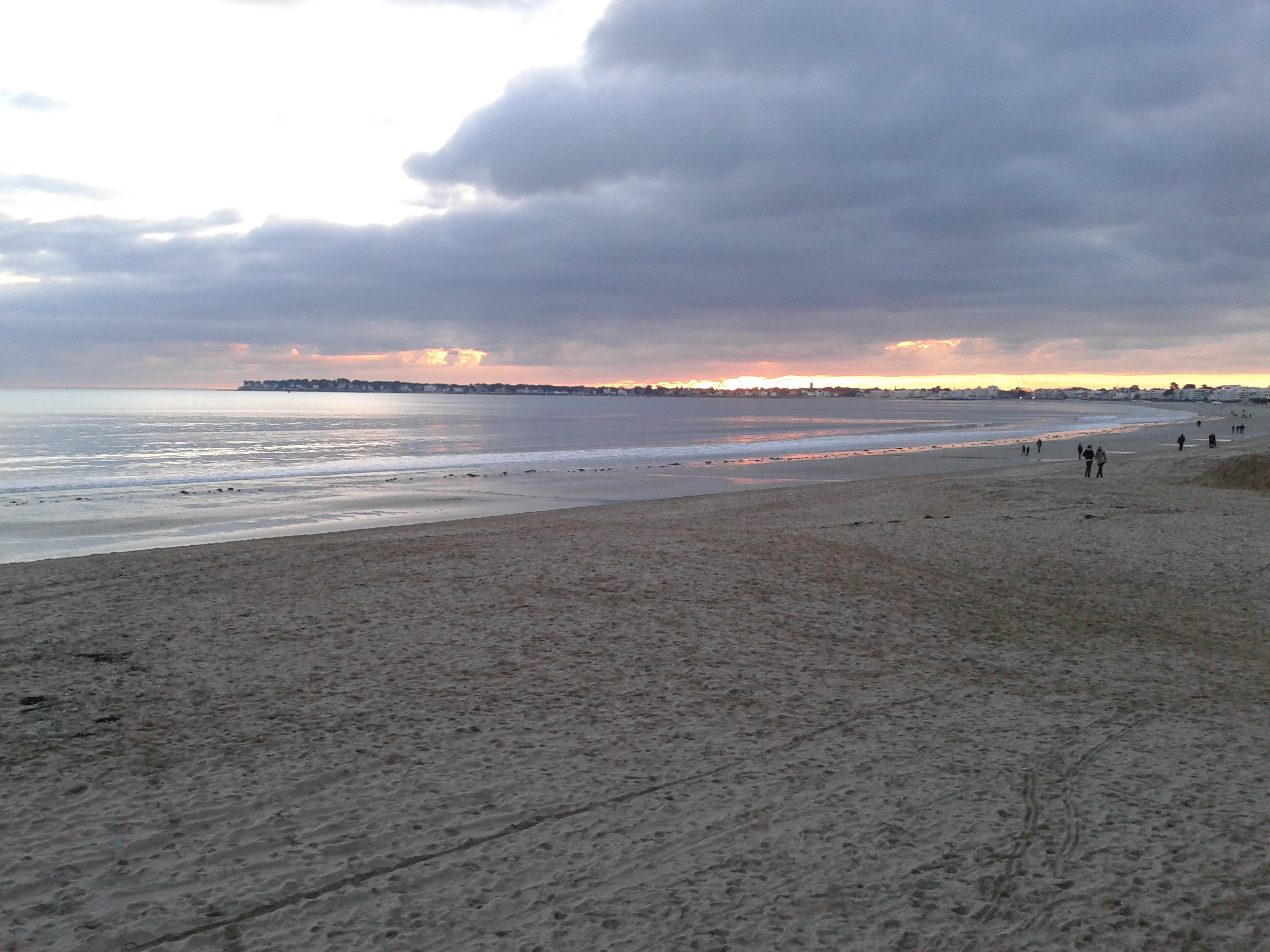
Beach

== See also ==
- Outline of France
- Communes of the Loire-Atlantique department
- La Baule-Escoublac
- Guérande
- Guérande Peninsula
- Saint-Nazaire
- Le Croisic
- Batz-sur-Mer
- Le Pouliguen
- Loire-Atlantique
- Pays de la Loire
