= Mother Hutton =

Mythical English character

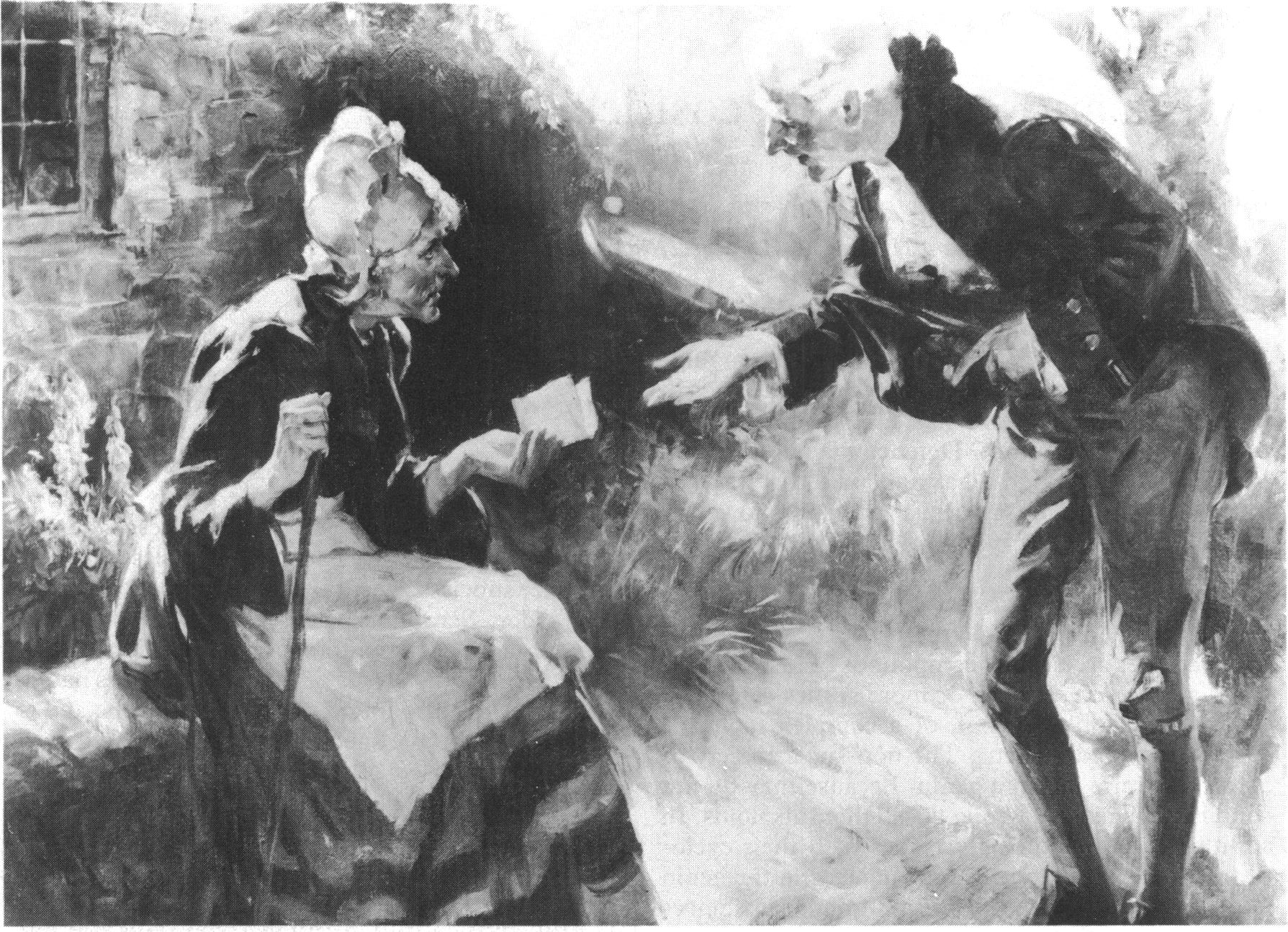
- William Withering and Mother Hutton as imagined by William Meade Prince

Mother Hutton, also known as Mrs. Hutton, old mother Hutton and "the old woman from Shropshire", was a mythical English character, fabricated in 1928 for marketing purposes by a pharmaceutical company, Parke-Davis, that manufactured digitalis, a drug used to treat dropsy.

The story involved real-life physician William Withering, who appeared to have learned of the value of the purple foxglove in the treatment of dropsy from 'Old Mother Hutton', the Shropshire herb-woman whom he met in Stafford or Birmingham and to whom he gave gold sovereigns for the information, as depicted hypothetically in the painting by William Meade Prince (1893–1951). However, he never mentioned a Mother Hutton in his works and a number of dates have since been found to be inconsistent.

== Story ==
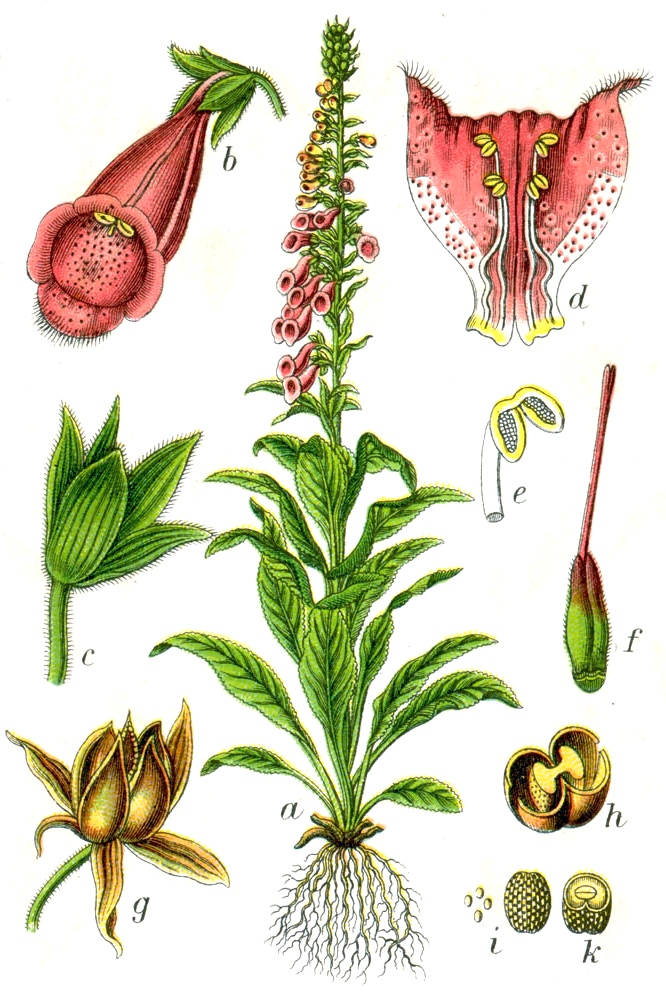
Digitalis purpurea (Foxglove)

Mother Hutton, also sometimes referred to as 'Mrs. Hutton', 'old mother Hutton' and 'the old woman from Shropshire', has for many years been popularly known as the 18th-century herbalist, physician and pharmacist, from Shropshire, who discovered by experimentation that foxglove could be used to treat dropsy. She added it and a variety of other herbs to a specially brewed tea, which she gave out as a remedy to those who needed it.

One popular story tells of how Mother Hutton cured the Dean of Brasenose College, Oxford, Dr. Cauley. He came to her with a severe case of dropsy for which she gave her cure. Subsequently, various dates have been given including 1765, 1766 and 1776, when she was approached by physician William Withering who sought her recipe and deduced that it was the foxglove that was responsible for the success. His experiments confirmed the hypothesis and he was credited with standardizing the preparations and doses of digitalis.

== Later reports ==
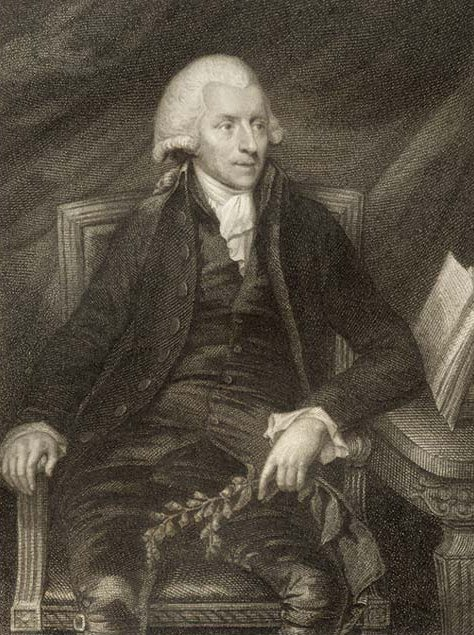
William Withering

Later sources point to 'Mother Hutton' as being a mythical character, fabricated in the 1920s for marketing purposes by a pharmaceutical company that manufactured digitalis, a drug used to treat dropsy.

She was created in 1928 in an illustration by William Meade Prince (1893–1951) as part of an advertising campaign by Parke-Davis (later part of Pfizer) who marketed digitalis preparations. Prince depicted Withering as much older in the painting, as he assumed the discovery happened in 1785.

There is no mention of a Mother Hutton in Withering's works and no mention of him meeting any old woman directly – he is merely asked to comment on a family recipe that was long kept secret by 'An Old woman IN Shropshire'. That is all that Withering says and so all that can ever be known as fact about the old woman. Since 1928, Mother Hutton's status has grown from being an image in an advertising poster to an acclaimed Wise Woman, Herbalist, Pharmacist and Medical Practitioner in Shropshire who was cheated out of her true recognition by Dr. Withering's unscrupulous methods. Withering was in fact informed of the Brasenose College case by one of his medical colleagues (Dr Ash) and the Dean was treated with Digitalis root, not the leaves which Withering recommended. This myth of Mother Hutton has been created by authors not going back to primary sources but instead simply copying and then embellishing the work of others. One book even has Withering chasing round the countryside twice, once seeking a Gypsy woman and then an herbalist, both with secret recipes – simply because the author read two different versions of the story and did not realise they were different versions of the same fake tale.

== See also ==
- Kate Campbell Hurd-Mead
