= William Withering =

English scientist (1741–1799)

William Withering FRS
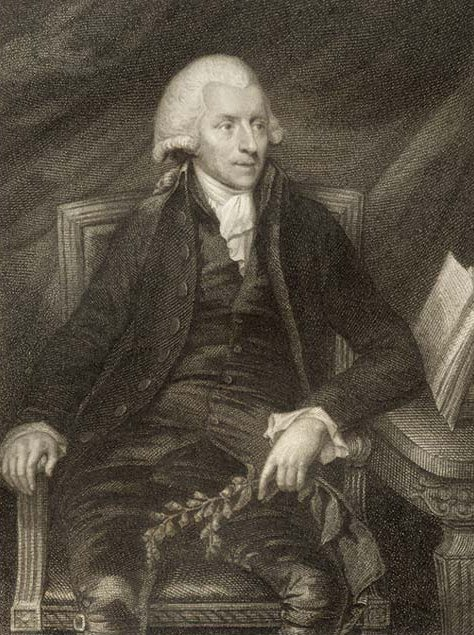
- Born: 17 March 1741; Wellington, Shropshire, England
- Died: 6 October 1799 (aged 58); Sparkbrook, Birmingham, England
- Education: University of Edinburgh Medical School
- Known for: Discovery of use of digitalis in treatment of dropsy
- Scientific career
- Fields: Botanist, geologist, chemist, physician
- Academic advisors: William Cullen
- Author abbrev. (botany): With.

Signature
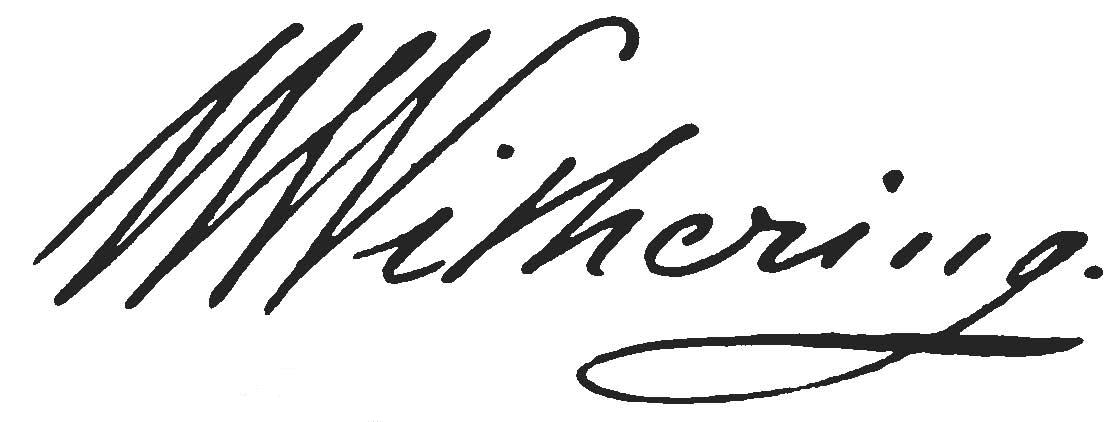

William Withering FRS (17 March 1741 – 6 October 1799) was an English botanist, geologist, chemist, physician and first systematic investigator of the bioactivity of digitalis.

Withering was born in Wellington, Shropshire, the son of a surgeon. He trained as a physician and studied medicine at the University of Edinburgh Medical School. He worked at Birmingham General Hospital from 1779. The story is that he noticed a person with dropsy (swelling from congestive heart failure) improve remarkably after taking a traditional herbal remedy; Withering became famous for recognising that the active ingredient in the mixture came from the foxglove plant. The active ingredient in the plant he used, the purple foxglove, is now known as digitoxin, after the plant's scientific name. Digoxin is the name of a similar compound found in the woolly foxglove, Digitalis lanata. In 1785, Withering published An Account of the Foxglove and some of its Medical Uses, which contained reports on clinical trials and notes on digitalis's effects and toxicity.

== Biography ==
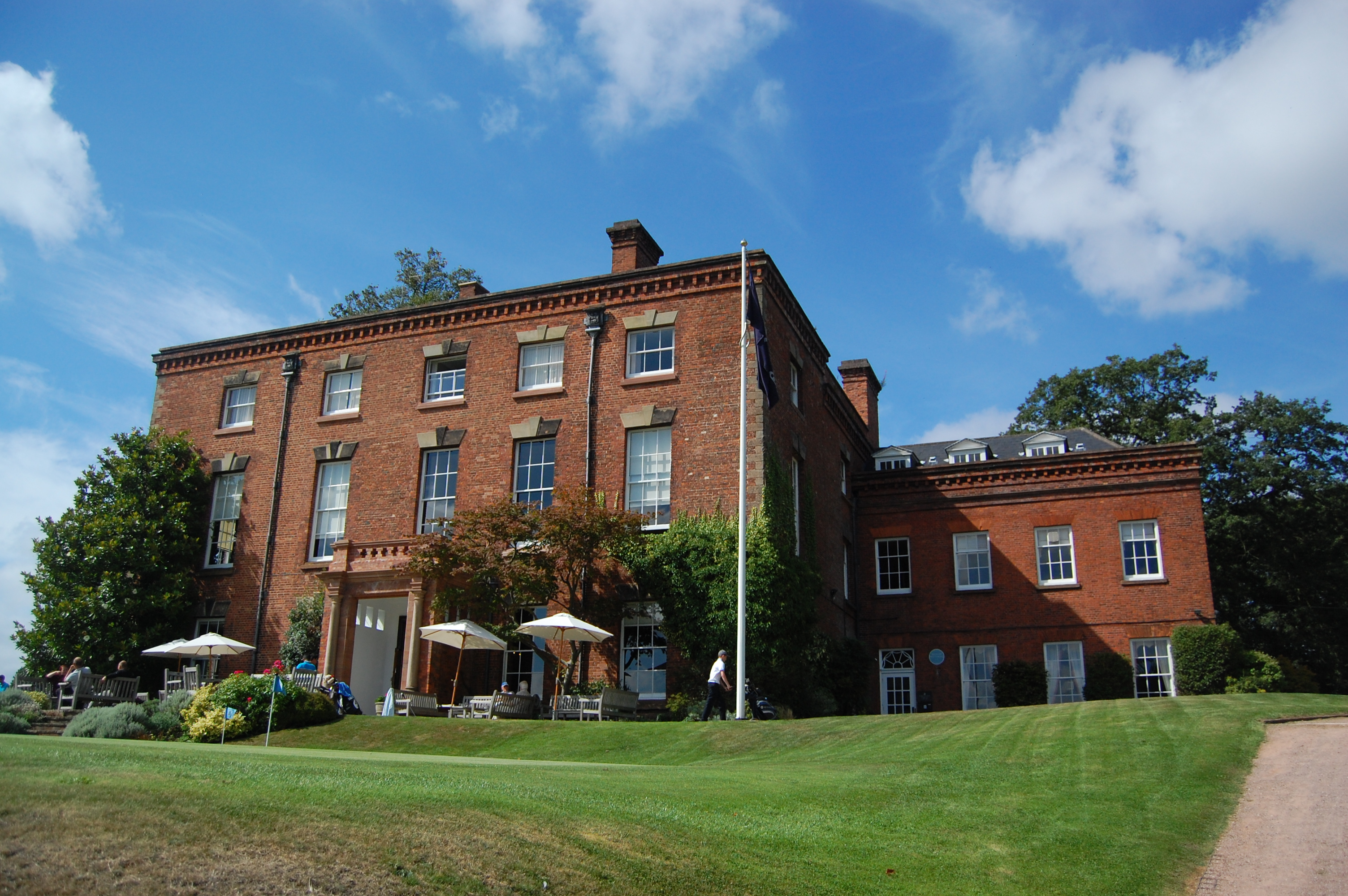
Edgbaston Hall

Born in England, Withering attended Edinburgh Medical School from 1762 to 1766. In 1767 he started as a consultant at Stafford Royal Infirmary. He married Helena Cookes (a botanical illustrator, and a former patient of his) in 1772; they had three children (the first, Helena was born in 1775 but died a few days later, William was born in 1776, and Charlotte in 1778). In 1775 Withering was appointed physician to Birmingham General Hospital (at the suggestion of Erasmus Darwin, a physician and founder member of the Lunar Society), but in 1783 he diagnosed himself as having pulmonary tuberculosis and went twice to Portugal, hoping that the better winter climate would improve his health; it did not. On the way home from his second trip there, the ship he was in was chased by pirates. In 1785 he was elected a Fellow of the prestigious Royal Society and also published his Account of the Foxglove (see below). The following year he leased Edgbaston Hall, in Birmingham. He was one of the members of the Lunar Society. During the Birmingham riots of 1791 (in which Joseph Priestley's home was demolished) he prepared to flee from Edgbaston Hall, but his staff kept the rioters at bay until the military arrived. In 1799 he decided that he could not tolerate another winter in the cold and draughty Hall, so he bought "The Larches" in the nearby Sparkbrook area; his wife did not feel up to the move and remained at Edgbaston Hall. After moving to The Larches on 28 September, he died on 6 October 1799.

== Botany ==
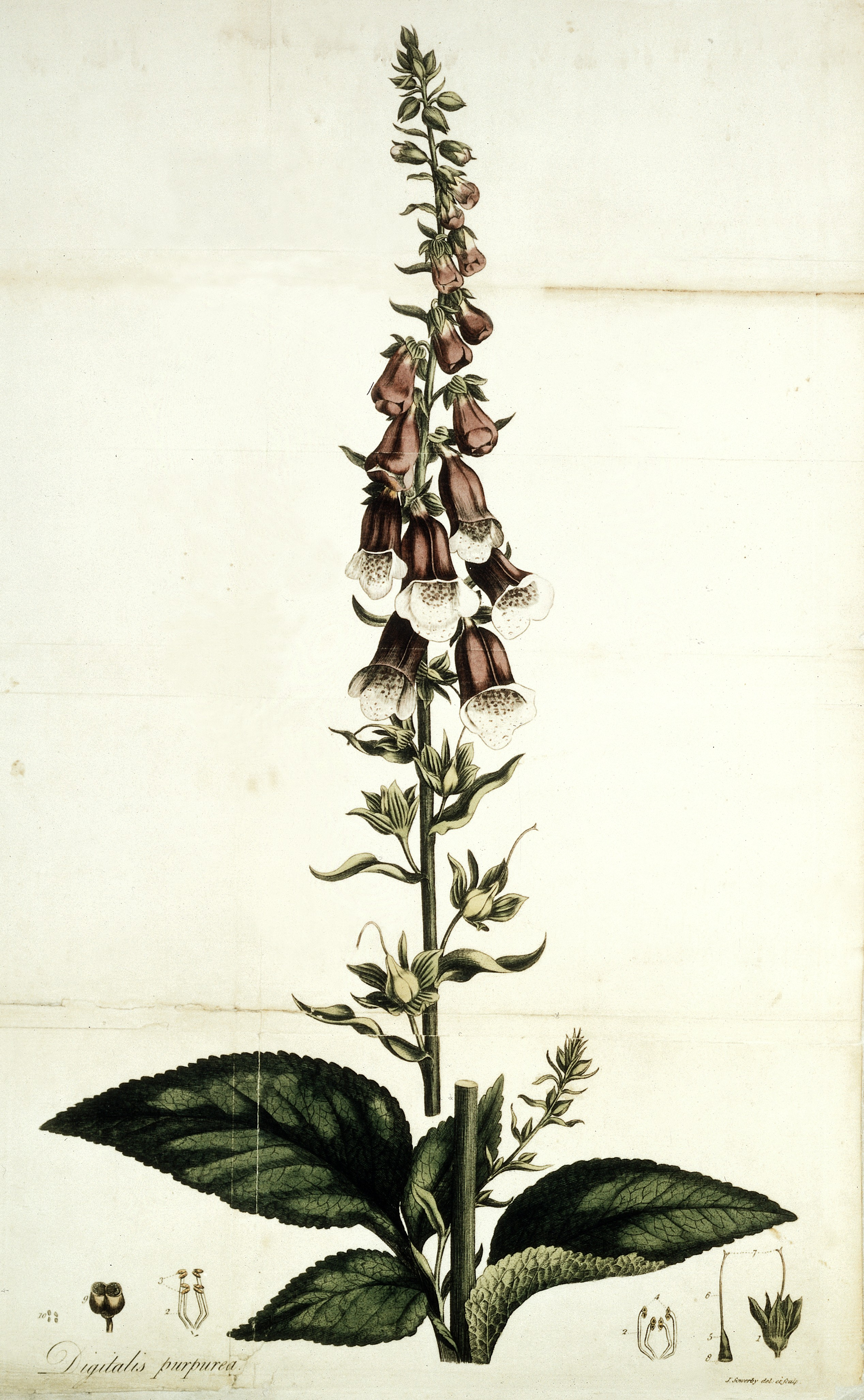
Illustration from An Account of the Foxglove

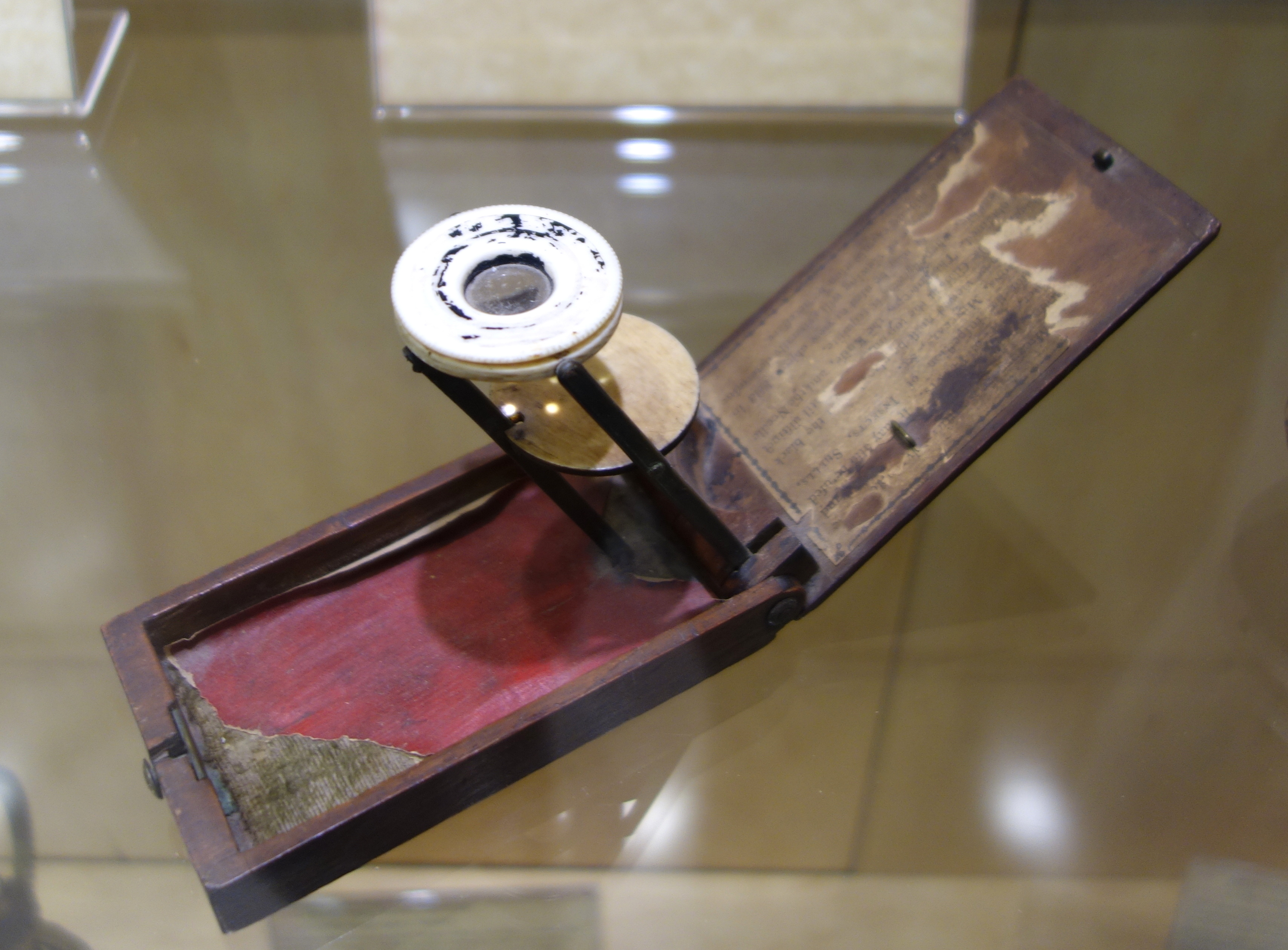
Pocket microscope by Withering

In 1776, he published The botanical arrangement of all the vegetables naturally growing in Great Britain, an early and influential British Flora. It was the first in English based on the then new Linnaean taxonomy — a classification of all living things — devised by the Swedish botanist and physician Carl Linnaeus (1707–1778). At the time he was criticised for having produced a bowdlerised version of Linnaeus, deliberately omitting any references to sexual reproduction, out of a desire to protect 'female modesty', notably by 'A Botanical Society, at Lichfield' - almost always incorrectly named as The Botanical Society of Lichfield or the Lichfield Botanical Society. Withering explained on the title page and his introduction that he avoided being explicit to allow his book to be used without any problems by a wider audience and in particular women. (Note: "Dr. Withering...has translated parts of the Genera and Species Plantarum of LINNEUS; but has entirely omitted the sexual distinctions, which are essential to the philosophy of the system") However he found support for his position, and botany was considered a subject suitable for many women during the next century. A talented illustrator herself, his wife, Helena, sketched plants he collected.

Withering wrote two more editions of this work in 1787 and 1792, in collaboration with fellow Lunar Society member Jonathan Stokes, and after his death his son (also William) published four more. It continued being published under various authors until 1877. Withering senior also carried out pioneering work into the identification of fungi and invented a folding pocket microscope for use on botanical field trips. He also introduced to the general audience the screw down plant press and the vasculum. In 1787 he was elected a Fellow of the Linnaean Society in recognition of his contribution to botany. Subsequently, the plant Witheringia solanacea was named in his honour, and he became known on the continent of Europe as "The English Linnaeus". The William Withering Chair in Medicine at the University of Birmingham Medical School is named after him, as is the medical school's annual William Withering Lecture.

== Discovery of digitalis ==
Allegedly, Withering first learned of the use of digitalis in treating "dropsy" (a range of conidtions associated with fluid retention, such as peripheral œdema, ovarian cyst, pleural effusion, and hydrocephalus) from "Mother Hutton", an old woman who practised as a folk herbalist in Shropshire, who used the plant as part of a polyherbal formulation containing over 20 different ingredients to successfully treat this condition. Withering deduced that digitalis was the active ingredient in the formulation, and over the next ten years he carefully tried out different preparations of various parts of the plant (collected at different seasons) documenting 156 cases in which he had used digitalis, and describing the effects and the best - and safest - ways of using it. At least one of these cases was a patient for whom Erasmus Darwin had asked Withering for his second opinion. In January 1785 Darwin submitted a paper entitled "An Account of the Successful Use of Foxglove in Some Dropsies and in Pulmonary Consumption" to the College of Physicians in London; it was presented by Darwin in March of that year. A postscript at the end of the published volume of transactions containing Darwin's paper states that "Whilst the last pages of this volume were in the press, Dr Withering of Birmingham ... published a numerous collection of cases in which foxglove has been given, and frequently with good success". After this, Darwin and Withering became increasingly estranged, and eventually an argument broke out, apparently because Darwin's son, Robert Darwin accused Withering of unprofessional behaviour by effectively poaching patients. Witherings' work was widely discussed and cited by successive generations of researchers. This subsequently led to the isolation of digoxin and its use in medicine as a treatment for heart failure.

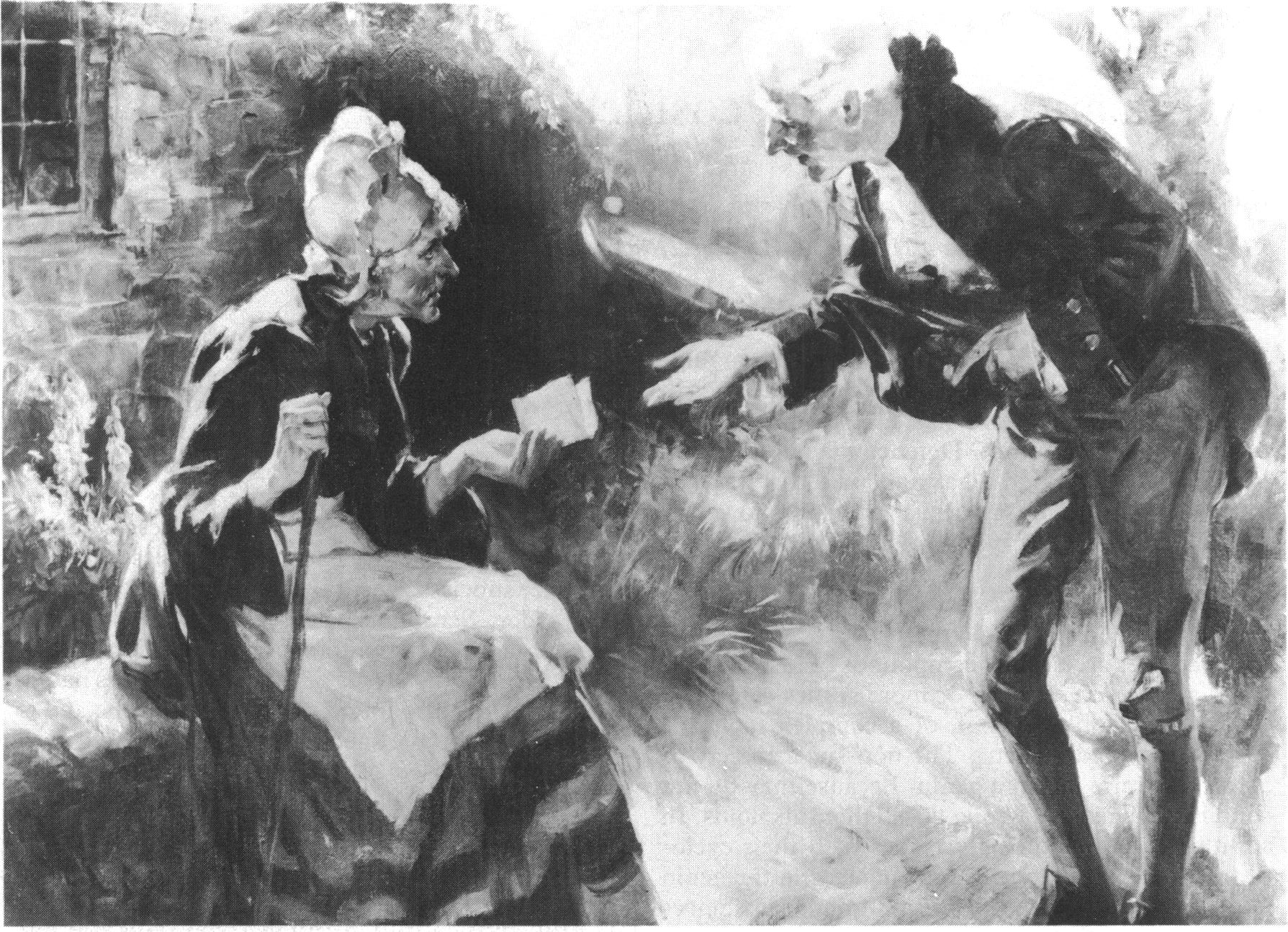
"William Withering and Mother Hutton"; illustration by William Meade Prince (1928)

In reality "Mother Hutton" was created in 1928 in an illustration by William Meade Prince as part of an advertising campaign by Parke-Davis, who marketed digitalis preparations. There is no mention of a Mother Hutton in Withering's works or anyone else's and no mention of him meeting any old woman directly. In his account he states that he was merely asked by a colleague to comment on what was originally an old woman's receipt or recipe (that she had long kept secret). Since 1928, Mother Hutton's status has grown from being an image in an advertising poster to an acclaimed wise woman, herbalist, pharmacist, and medical practitioner in Shropshire who was cheated out of her true recognition by Dr. Withering's unscrupulous methods. The story often written around this is also totally apocryphal. Withering was in fact informed by one of his medical colleagues, Dr. Ash at Birmingham Hospital, of the case of the head of Brasenose College, Oxford who was treated with digitalis root not leaves. The myth of Mother Hutton and how Withering chased her around Shropshire has been created by authors not going back to primary sources but instead copying and then embellishing the unreferenced work of others. See "Withering and The Foxglove; the making of a myth" by D.M. Krikler (British Heart Journal, 1985, 54: 256–257). In Withering's Account of the Foxglove, printed in 1785, Withering mentions seven different occasions when foxglove was brought to his attention. Recognising that the foxglove was the active ingredient in old Shropshire woman's family recipe would not have been difficult, given his expert botanical knowledge. Withering had first published his Botanical Arrangement, the first English text to espouse Linnaean principles, in 1776, and in it he suggested that foxglove deserved looking at in more detail. Erasmus Darwin tried to take the credit for foxglove and failed. Erasmus Darwin then attempted to try to discredit Withering behind the scenes with the unwitting help of his son Robert, having earlier used the thesis of his dead son Charles to try to establish priority. Charles Darwin in fact had been friendly with Withering (as had Robert) and had talked in Edinburgh University about Withering's experiments with foxglove. Erasmus Darwin was probably jealous that Withering had become the most famous and sought-after doctor outside London and that Withering's Botanical Arrangement became the standard reference source and far exceeded the botanical publications of Erasmus (all published semi-anonymously) in popularity. Withering's Botanical Arrangement, although now almost forgotten, became the standard reference for English Botany for the next 100 years, in 14 editions, edited after his death first by his son, also William, and later others.

== Chemistry and geology ==
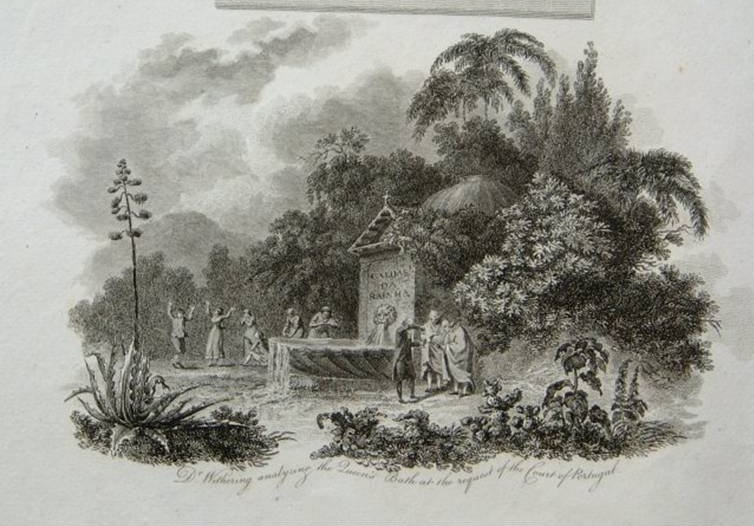
Withering analysing thermal waters at Caldas da Rainha

Withering was an enthusiastic chemist and geologist. He conducted a series of experiments on Terra Ponderosa, a heavy ore from Cumberland, England. He deduced that it contained a hitherto undescribed element which he was unable to characterise. It was later shown to be barium carbonate and in 1789 the German geologist Abraham Gottlob Werner named the mineral Witherite in his honour. The Matthew Boulton mineral collection of Birmingham Museum and Art Gallery may contain one of the earliest known specimens of witherite. A label in Boulton's handwriting records; "No. 2 Terra Ponderosa Aerata, given me by Dr. Withering"

Withering also undertook analyses of the mineral content of a number of spa waters in England and abroad, notably at the medicinal spa at Caldas da Rainha in Portugal. This latter undertaking occurred during the winter of 1793–4, and he was subsequently elected to the Fellowship of the Royal Academy of Sciences of Portugal.

== Memorials ==
William Withering's memorial plaque inside St Bartholomew's Church, Edgbaston

He was buried on 10 October 1799 in Edgbaston Old Church next to Edgbaston Hall, Birmingham, although the exact site of his grave is unknown. The memorial stone, now moved inside the church, has foxgloves and Witheringia solanaceae carved upon it to commemorate his discovery and his wider contribution to botany. He is also remembered by one of the Lunar Society Moonstones in Birmingham and by a blue plaque at Edgbaston Hall. Birmingham University School of Medicine established a Chair of Medicine post in his honour, named after him.

In July 2011 a J D Wetherspoon public house opened in Withering's birthplace, Wellington, and has been named after him.

== Publications ==
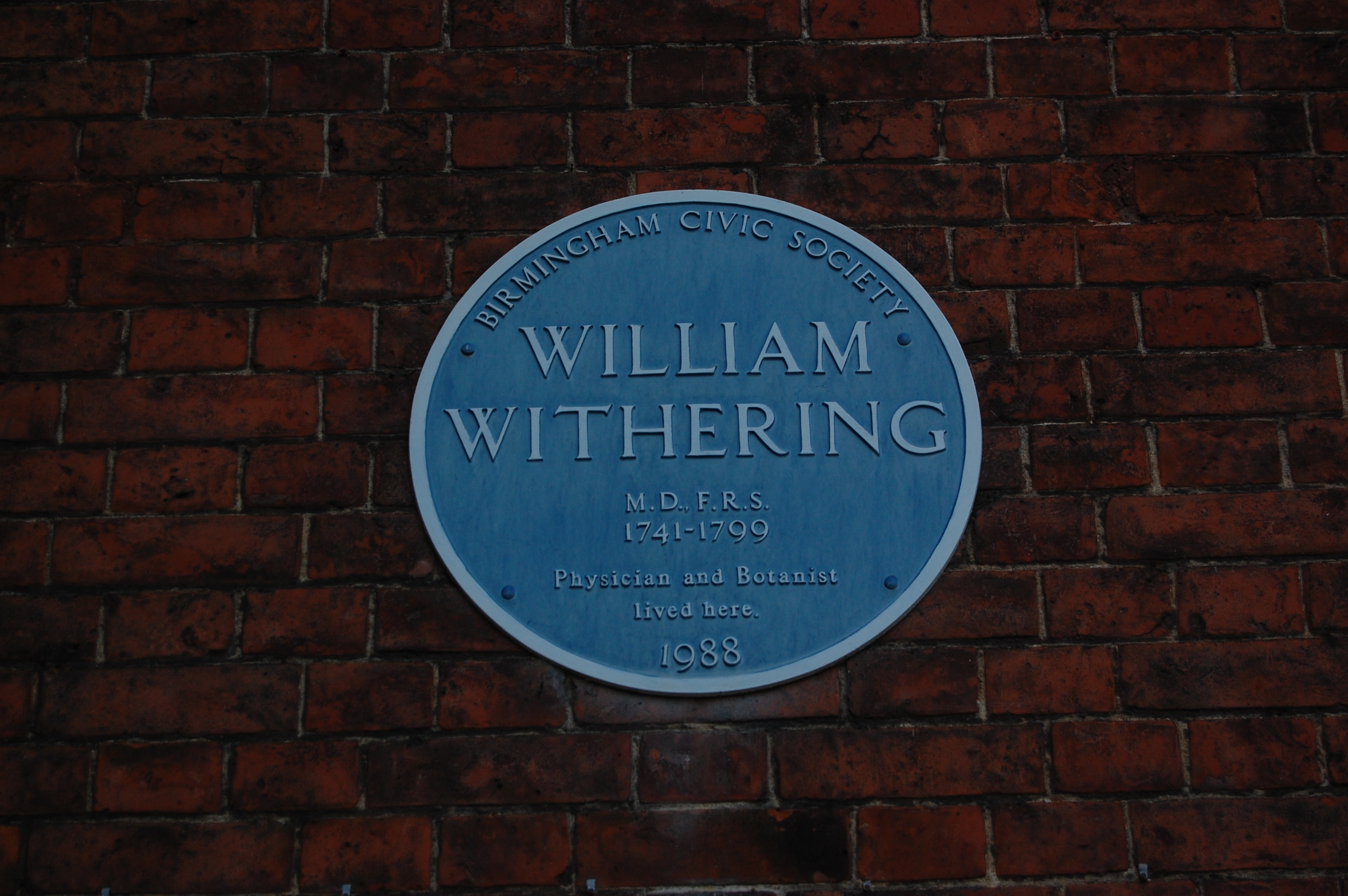
Blue plaque at Edgbaston Hall

This list is drawn from Sheldon, 2004:

- 1766 Dissertation on angina gangrenosa
- 1773 "Experiments on different kinds of Marle found in Staffordshire" Phil Trans. 63: 161-2
- Withering, William (1776a). A Botanical Arrangement of All the Vegetables Naturally Growing in Great Britain: With Descriptions of the Genera and Species, According to the System of the Celebrated Linnaeus. Being an Attempt to Render Them Familiar to Those who are Unacquainted with the Learned Languages. vol i. Birmingham: Swinney.
- Withering, William (1776b). A Botanical Arrangement of All the Vegetables Naturally Growing in Great Britain: With Descriptions of the Genera and Species, According to the System of the Celebrated Linnaeus. Being an Attempt to Render Them Familiar to Those who are Unacquainted with the Learned Languages. vol ii. Birmingham: Swinney.
- 1779 "An account of the scarlet fever and sore throat, or scarlatina; particularly as it appeared at Birmingham in the year 1778" Publ Cadell London
- 1782 "An analysis of two mineral substance, vz. the Rowley rag-stone and the toad stone" Phil Trans 72: 327-36
- 1783 "Outlines of mineralogy" Publ Cadell, London (a translation of Bergmann's Latin original)
- 1784 "Experiments and observations on the terra ponderosa" Phil trans 74: 293-311
- 1785 "An account of the foxglove and some of its medical uses; with practical remarks on the dropsy, and some other diseases" Publ Swinney, Birmingham
- 1787 "A botanical arrangement of British plants..." 2nd ed. Publ Swinney, London
- 1788 Letter to Joseph Priestley on the principle of acidity, the decomposition of water. Phil Trans 78: 319-330
- 1790 "An account of some extraordinary effects of lightning" Phil Trans 80: 293-5
- 1793 "An account of the scarlet fever and sore throat..." 2nd ed Publ Robinson, London
- 1793 "A chemical analysis of waters at Caldas" extract from Actas da Academica real das Sciencias
- 1794 "A new method for preserving fungi, ascertained by chymical experiments" Trans Linnean Soc 2: 263-6
- 1795 "Analyse chimica da aqua das Caldas da Rainha" Lisbon (a chemical analysis of the water of Caldas da Rainha)
- 1796 "Observations on the pneumatic medicine" Ann Med 1: 392-3
- 1796 "An arrangement of British plants..." 3rd ed. Publ Swinney, London
- 1799 "An account of a convenient method of inhaling the vapour of volatile substances" Ann Med 3: 47-51
