= Botanical expedition =

Scientific voyage to explore the flora of particular region

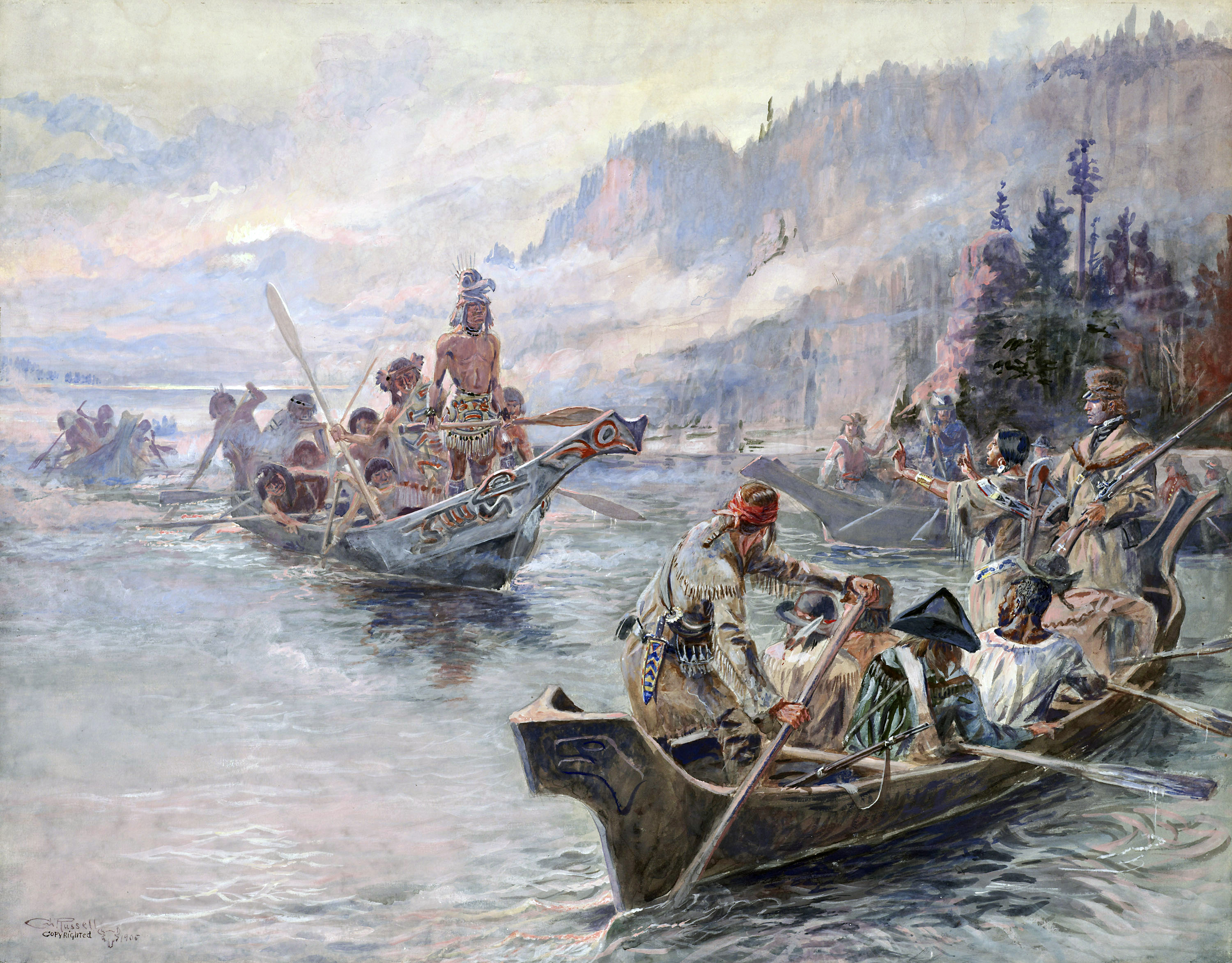
Lewis and Clark Expedition on the lower Columbia River Charles Marion Russell, 1905

A botanical expedition (sometimes called "plant hunting") is a scientific voyage designed to explore the flora of a particular region, either as a specific design or part of a larger expedition. A naturalist or botanist would be responsible for identification, description and collection of specimens. In some cases the plants might be collected by the person in the field, but described and named by a government sponsored scientist at a botanical garden or university. For example, species collected on the Lewis and Clark Expedition were described and named by Frederick Traugott Pursh.

While accounts of plant collection occur in antiquity, a scientific basis occurred during the Renaissance and was associated with the establishment of botanical gardens and the teaching of botany as a discipline. The practice of botanical expeditions reached a peak in the late 18th and during the 19th century with the systematic organisation of plants into taxonomic classifications. Plant collection has attracted a number of criticisms of exploitation and colonialism leading to the establishment of international regulations and safeguards.

== Description ==
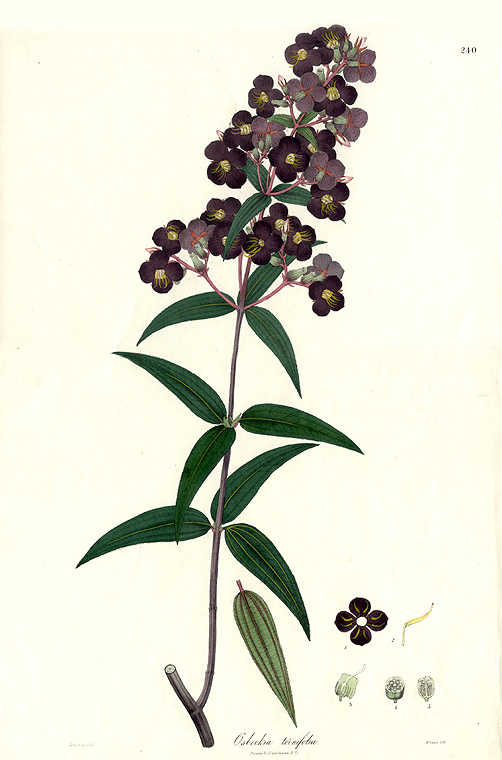
Osbeckia ternifolia from Wallich’s Plantae Asiaticae Rariores (1830-2)

Botanical expeditions have often been referred to as "plant hunting" (or less commonly "botanomania"). They are mainly scientific journeys or voyages designed to explore the flora of a particular region. In some cases such an expedition could be specifically designed for exploring the flora, or be part of studying the overall natural history or geography of the region. A naturalist or botanist with the expedition would be responsible for identifying, describing and drawing or photographing the plants, collecting specimens using equipment such as a plant press or Wardian case, and identifying those of potential economic importance. On botanical expeditions funded by governments, the plants were often collected by the person in the field, but described and named by government sponsored scientists at botanical gardens and universities. For example, many of the species collected on the Lewis and Clark Expedition were described and named by Frederick Traugott Pursh.

Botanical expeditions have been driven by a number of motives, such as scientific discovery, economic incentives in terms of resources or for the horticultural trade, such as the Veitch enterprise in the late 19th century. Collection in the field and transportation provided considerable challenges. Initially, dried specimens together with descriptions and drawings were the main way of adding to the knowledge of the flora. Examples include the drawings by local artists described by Wallich at the botanical gardens in Calcutta in the early 19th century. These initial descriptions then became the “type”, or reference, for subsequent descriptions of the taxon. Transportation of live specimens was initially fraught with hazard, as described by John Lindley of the London Horticultural Society in 1824, with one estimate of survival in 1819, being one in a thousand. This problem was considerably improved by the development of the Wardian case in 1829.

The plant collector’s job is to uncover the hidden beauties of the world, so that others may share his joy.
Frank Kingdon-Ward, From China to Hkamti Long, 1924.

== History ==
The systematic collection of plants dates from the Renaissance although accounts of organised collection date back as far as the Pharaohs of 2000 BCE who illustrated plants and trees they found on their military campaigns abroad, while Queen Hatsheput (c. 1507–1458 BCE) dispatched an expedition to bring back frankincense from Punt (probably modern day Somalia). Later, Alexander the Great (356–323 BCE) would bring back plants from his expeditions, increasing the level of botanical knowledge of his time, and establishing the Silk Roads between the Far East and Europe. Following the Fall of Constantinople in 1453, the emphasis shifted to maritime routes of exploration. The Renaissance brought a new understanding of plants from study of ancient texts, in particular those of Aristotle and Theophrastus, leading to not only collection, but also the establishment of botanical gardens (such as those of Pisa and Padua in the 1540s and Bologna in 1568), the publication of herbals that described the plants and the teaching of botany in the universities. In addition to the collection and growing of live plants in the gardens, came the establishment of the hortus siccus (dry garden) for dried specimens and the physic garden for medicinal plants. The first professional hunters were probably the 17th century Tradescants. Many of the most important expeditions took part in the late 18th and 19th centuries with the systematic organisation of plants into taxonomic classifications. There were many dangers involved in plant collecting expeditions, and some ended tragically.

== Criticism ==
Plant hunting has been the subject of criticism, for its Eurocentric and colonialist past and also attracted description as piracy and theft. This in turn has led to the creation of the Convention on Biologiocal Diversity and the Convention on International Trade in Endangered Species (CITES) to ensure that those countries from which the plants originated also benefit. also the wealth that created the opportunities for European nations to mount major expeditions came partly from slavery, while a number of early plant collectors were missionaries, such as Matteo Ricci, an Italian Jesuit priest who arrived in China in 1582. Other collectors were diplomats and merchants who supplied the great European gardens. Plant hunting was not necessarily entirely exploitative, as many used the opportunities to also explore, understand and learn from local cultures, such as Maria Sibylla (1647 – 1717), a German naturalist who worked in the Dutch colonies of South America, and David Douglas (1799 – 1834), perhaps best known for following up on Lewis and Clark's discoveries and for the Douglas Fir (Pseudotsuga menziesii). Other criticisms relate to failure to acknowledge the considerable contribution of local collaborators. Again, there were exceptions such as Sherriff and Ludlow who worked in the Himalayas in the 1930s and 1940s.

== See also ==
- Plant collecting
- Stanley Field British Guiana Expedition of 1922

== Bibliography ==
Books

- Bleichmar, Daniela (2012). Visible Empire: Botanical Expeditions and Visual Culture in the Hispanic Enlightenment. University of Chicago Press. ISBN 978-0-226-05853-5.
- Edwards, Ambra (2021). The Plant-Hunter's Atlas: A World Tour of Botanical Adventures, Chance Discoveries and Strange Specimens. Quercus Publishing, Royal Botanic Gardens, Kew. ISBN 978-1-5294-1012-9.
- Edwards, Amelia B. (1891). Pharaohs, Fellahs and Explorers. Harper.
- Fry, Carolyn (2017) [2009 Andre Deutsch]. The Plant Hunters: The Adventures of the World's Greatest Botanical Explorers. Carlton Books, Limited. ISBN 978-0-233-00516-4.
  - Burke, Horace R. (1 October 2014). "Fry, Carolyn. The plant hunters: the adventures of the world's greatest botanical explorers. University of Chicago Press, Chicago: 2013. Pp 63; illustrated. Price US$ 30.00 (hardback). ISBN 9780226093314". Archives of Natural History (review). 41 (2): 374–375. doi:10.3366/anh.2014.0267.
- Silvey, Anita (2015). The Plant Hunters: True Stories of Their Daring Adventures to the Far Corners of the Earth. Farrar, Straus and Giroux (BYR). ISBN 978-1-4668-9529-4.

Articles

- Janick, Jules (April 2007). "Plant Exploration: From Queen Hatshepsut to Sir Joseph Banks" (PDF). HortScience. 42 (2): 191–196. doi:10.21273/HORTSCI.42.2.191.
- Shteir, Ann B. (1990). "Botanical Dialogues: Maria Jacson and Women's Popular Science Writing in England". Eighteenth-Century Studies. 23 (3 Spring): 301–317. doi:10.2307/2738798. JSTOR 2738798.

Websites

- Mulligan, Patrick; McHale, Ellen (24 January 2020). "How Victorian plant hunters shaped British gardens". Royal Botanic Gardens, Kew.
- Reveal, James L (6 February 2008a). "Frederick Traugott Pursh (1774-1820)". Plant Biology, The Lewis and Clark Herbarium. Department of Plant Biology, Cornell University.
- Reveal, James L (6 February 2008b). "David Douglas (1799-1834)". Plant Biology, The Lewis and Clark Herbarium. Department of Plant Biology, Cornell University.
- LaBouff, Nicole (24 April 2018). "Botanomania and the secret history of women plant collectors". Stories. Minneapolis Institute of Art.
