= Stanley Field British Guiana Expedition of 1922 =

Historic Botanical Expedition

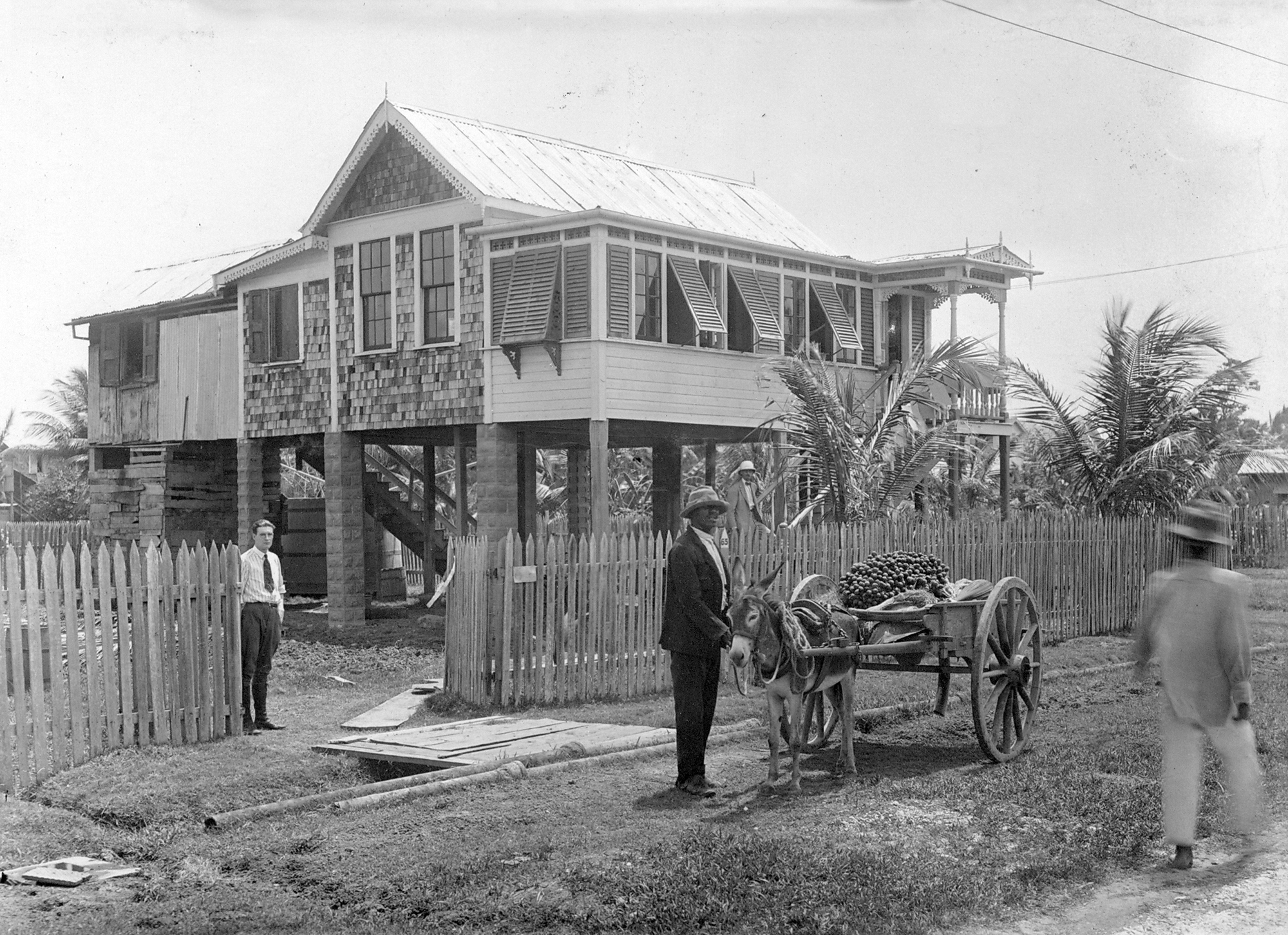
- J. R. Millar stands at the gate to the Field Museum's headquarters in Georgetown during the 1922 botanical expedition to British Guiana.
- Leader: Bror Eric Dahlgren
- Start: Chicago, Illinois; 2 March 1922
- End: British Guiana (current day Guyana); September 1922
- Crew: Bror Eric Dahlgren; J. R. Millar; A. C. Persaud; Mr. Harris

The Stanley Field British Guiana Expedition of 1922 (2 March 1922 - September 1922) was a botanical expedition undertaken by The Field Museum of Natural History of Chicago, Illinois. The purpose of the expedition was to obtain botanical specimens for plant reproductions, exhibit displays, and further research in the museum's Department of Botany.

== Background ==
Stanley Field (related to Captain Marshall Field), who was then President of the Field Museum, contributed $3,000.00 to fund the expedition. During this time, the museum was conducting numerous scientific expeditions to South America, including to Colombia, Brazil, Peru, Chile, Argentina, and Uruguay.

At the time of the expedition British Guiana was considered a promising hotspot for botanical research, thanks to Robert Hermann Schomburgk and Moritz Richard Schomburgk's plant collections there in 1835-1844 and the establishment of the Guyana Botanical Garden in 1879.

== Expedition ==
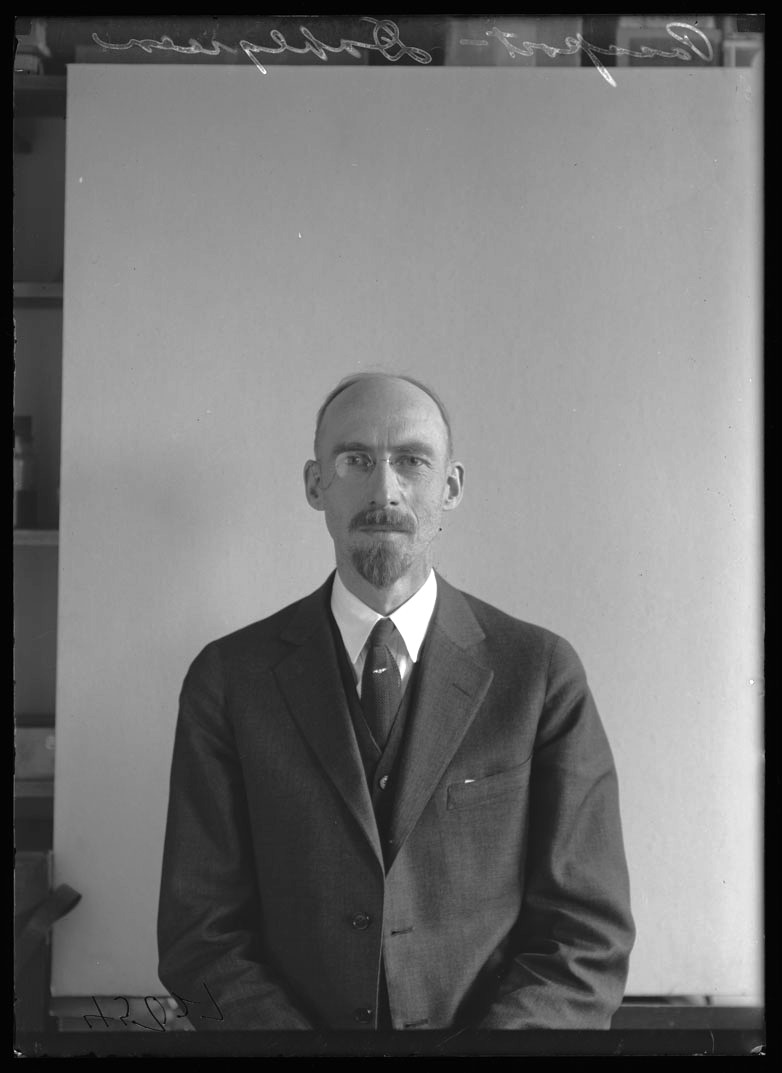
Passport portrait of Bror Dahlgren circa 1922.

Bror Eric Dahlgren led the expedition and departed by ship from Chicago on February 10, 1922. He was accompanied by John R. Millar, another member of the museum staff, as his assistant.

They took brief stops in Trinidad and Grenada, and they reached Georgetown, British Guiana on March 2, 1922. The majority of the expedition was spent in Georgetown with a 10 day excursion to Dutch Guiana.

Dahlgren was granted access to the grounds at the Georgetown Botanical Gardens where he collected many specimens and took many photographs.

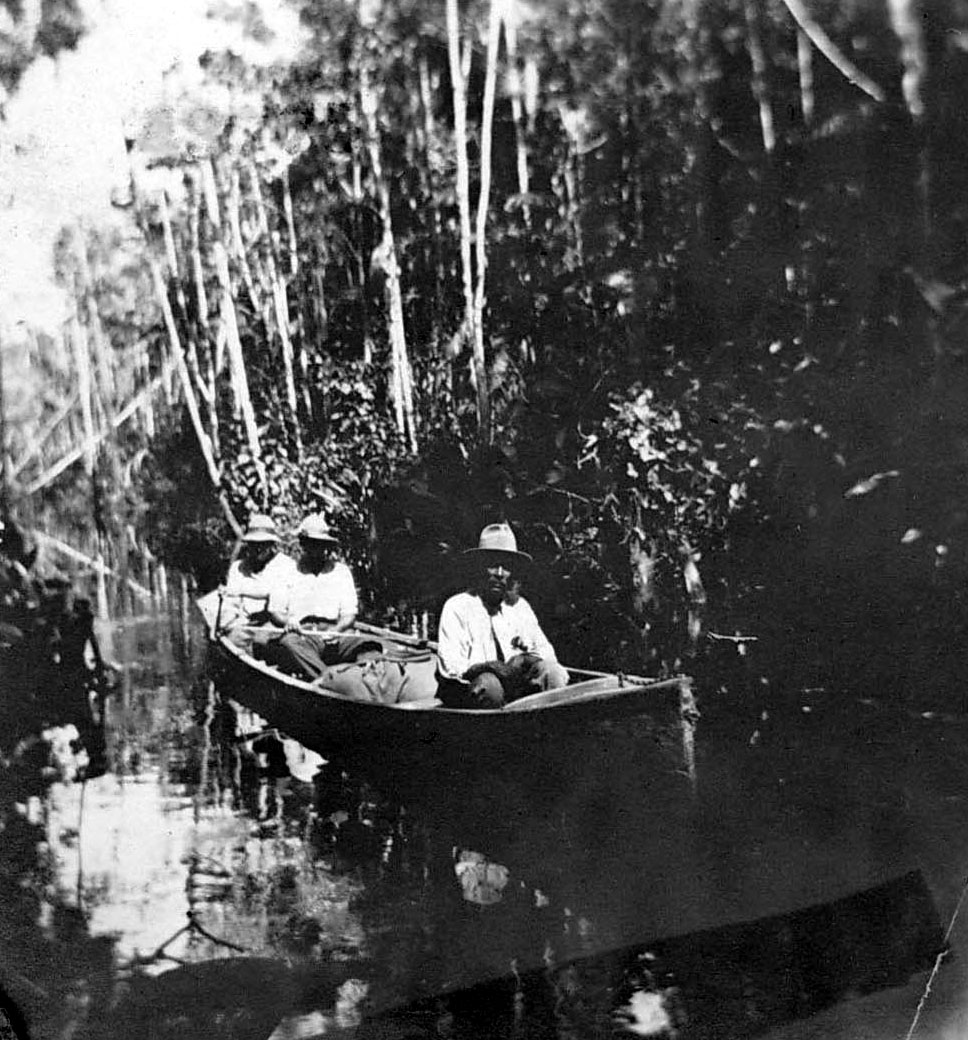
A. C. Persaud in the bow of a boat on a creek near the East Bank of the Demerara River.

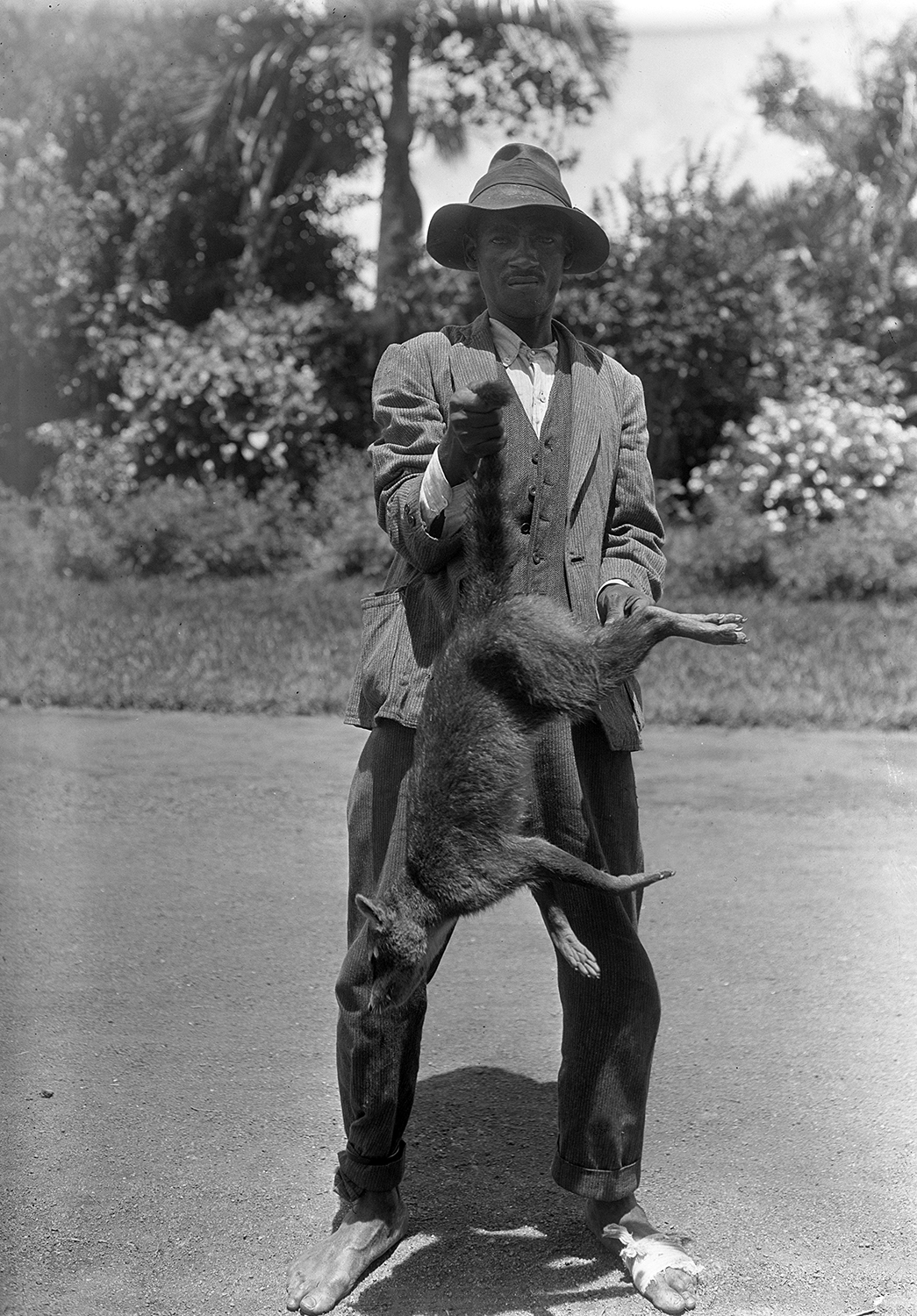
Mr. Harris holding a crab-eating raccoon.

The crew was assisted by a Guyanese botanist named Mr. A. C. Persaud, who volunteered his services to aid with plant collection. Persaud continued collecting specimens for the Field Museum after Dahlgren's departure until his death in Georgetown in 1924.

Given the tropical climate conditions, drying and preserving the plants was a challenge, especially for larger specimens such as palm trees. Dahlgren recorded the process of collecting, photographing, preserving, and creating wax molds for botanical specimens in his expedition field book. The crew rented a small cottage to use as a laboratory for these processes.

Dahlgren and his crew remained in South America for approximately 5 months before returning to Chicago. Mr. Persaud remained in British Guiana to continue collecting wood samples for The Field Museum.

== Collections ==
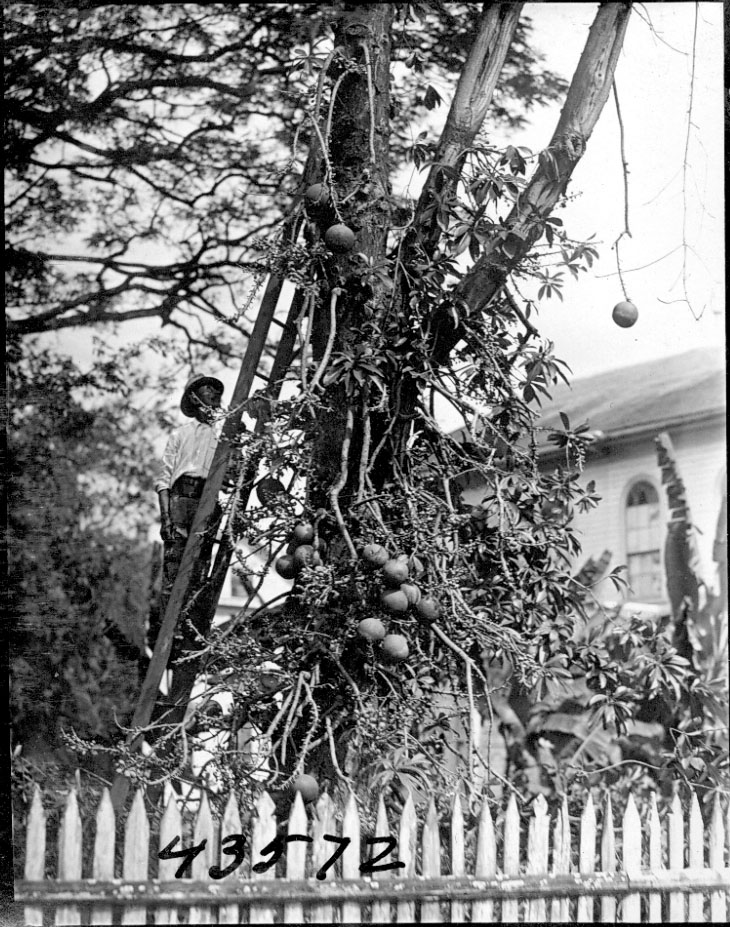
The trunk of a Cannonball tree collected from the yard of a church in Georgetown. This was used for the exhibit display at the Field Museum

Dahlgren and his crew collected a vast amount of material from British Guiana, including 235 plaster molds, 427 economic botany specimens, and 52 branches. Many specimens that were collected are listed as imports on the USDA's Inventory of Seeds and Plants Imported from 1922. In addition, the crew collected zoological specimens, geological specimens, photographs, and watercolor sketches. Much of the collection is housed in the Field Museum's archives and many specimens have been on display in the Field Museum's Plants of the World exhibit for nearly a century

One of the most notable specimens obtained from the expedition was the Cannonball Tree, or Couroupita guianensis. The expedition crew was given permission to take part of the trunk of a Cannonball tree in the yard of a church in Georgetown. This trunk, with its flowers and cannonball-shaped fruit, has been on display at the Field Museum since 1923.

Another notable specimen from the expedition that is on display at the Field Museum is a cluster of epiphytic plants and a parasitic fig tree growing around termite's nest.

Dahlgren and Persaud also collected >300 herbarium specimens, duplicates of which have been deposited at the Field Museum's Searle Family Herbarium, the Kew Herbarium, and several other herbaria around the world.

Dahlgren himself developed a process of using plaster molds of botanical specimens to create life-like wax plant displays for the museum. Other specimens on display at the museum include Victoria regia, Tucum palm, Banyan-like fig tree, and a cacao tree.
