= Seaweed collecting =

Process of collecting seaweed

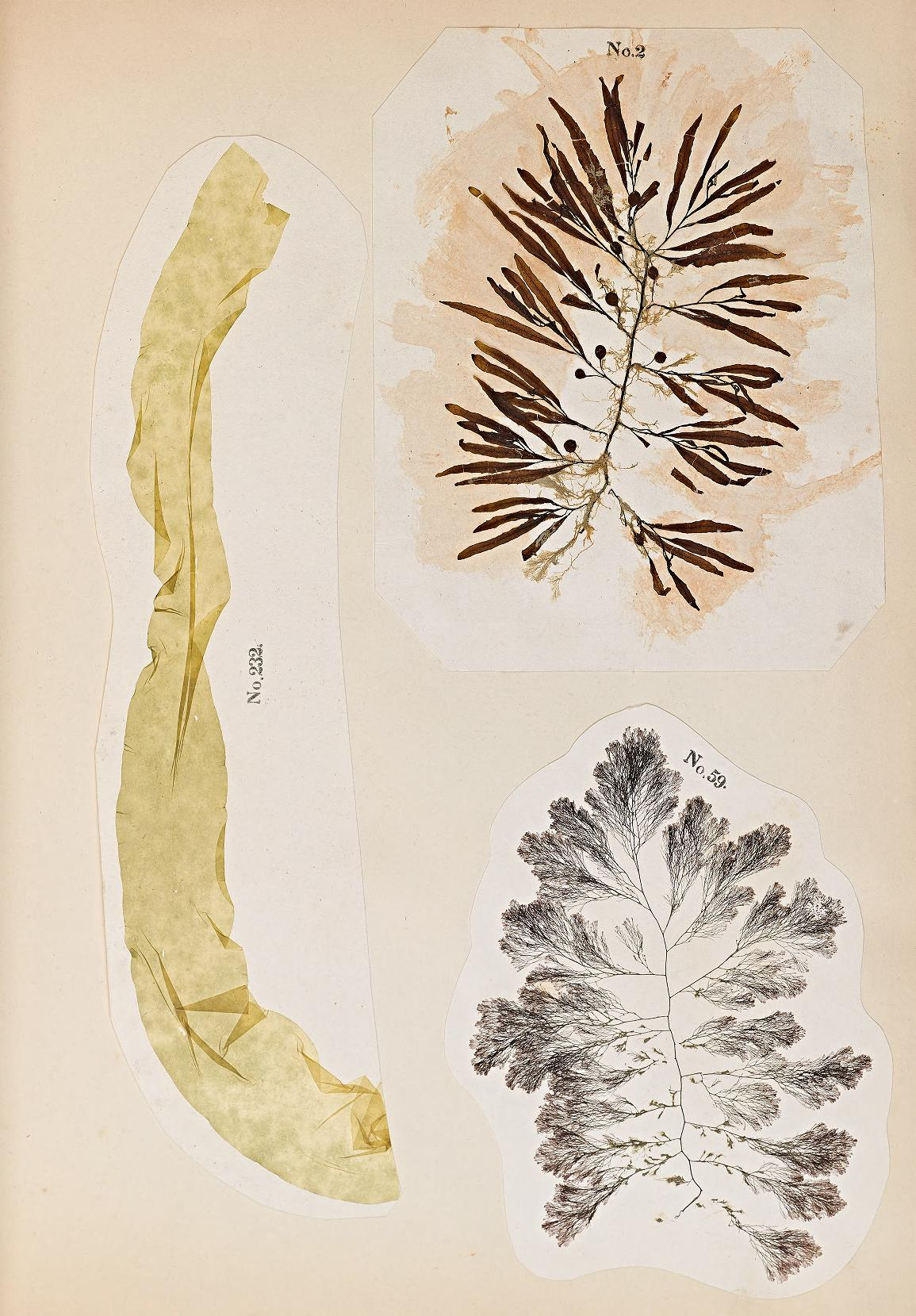
Seaweed from Charles F. Durant’s Algae and Corallines of the Bay & Harbor of New York (1850). Clockwise from top: Ulva linza, Sargassum montagnei, and Polysiphonia nigrescens

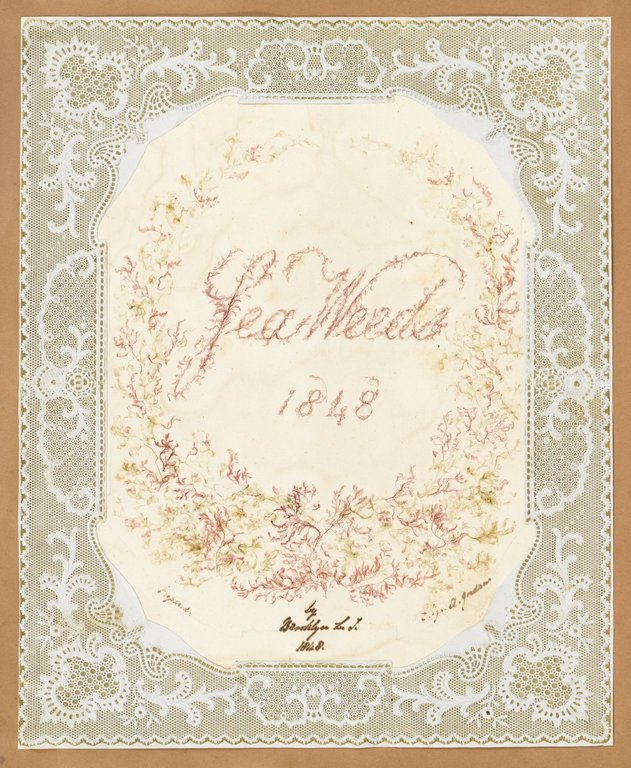
The title page from an 1848 Seaweed collection by Eliza A. Jordan of Brooklyn.

Seaweed collecting is the process of collecting, drying, and pressing seaweed. It became popular as a pastime in the Victorian era and remains a hobby today.

== History of seaweed collecting ==
Collecting seaweed can be traced back to at least the 17th century with the pressings found in Hans Sloane's Herbarium.

The pastime became increasingly popular during the Victorian Era, where it played to the burgeoning interest in natural history and collection in general. It was especially fashionable with young women, as it allowed a greater level of personal freedom. Indeed, it was so in-style that, as a young girl, Queen Victoria created her own seaweed album. The materials needed for the hobby became readily available at seaside shops. These activities also afforded women the opportunity to display their understanding and appreciation of the natural world.

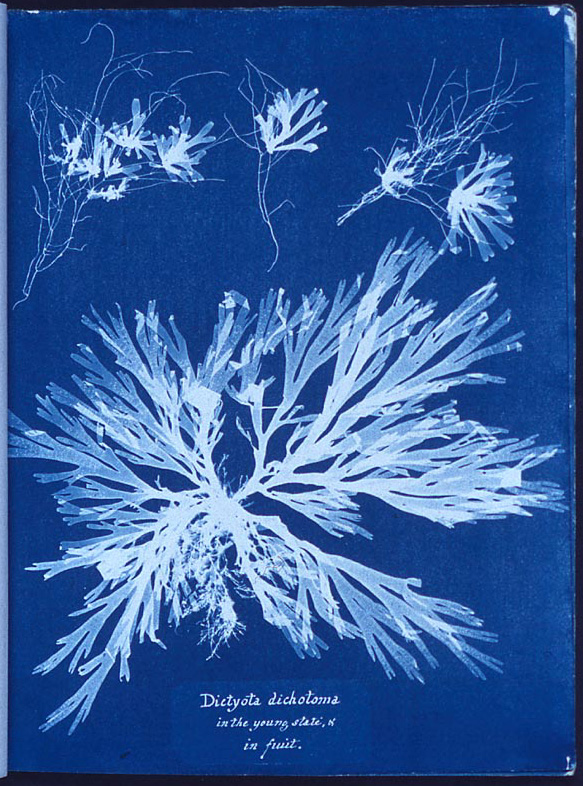
A photogram of Algae, made by Anna Atkins as part of her 1843 book, Photographs of British Algae: Cyanotype Impressions, the first book composed entirely of photographic images.

Anna Atkins, thought to be the first female photographer, published the first book using photographs as illustrations. This was Photographs of British Algae: Cyanotype Impressions and contained pictures of seaweed.

The actions of some of the collectors earned them recognition and admiration from their male, professional counterparts.

These Victorian collections form valuable historical resources for morphological studies and from which genomic DNA can be extracted.

== Seaweed collecting equipment ==
In his 1881 book, A.B. Hervey recommended the following equipment for collecting and pressing seaweed.

You should have a pair of pliers; a pair of scissors; a stick like a common cedar "pen stalk," with a needle driven into the end of it, or, in lack of that, any stick sharpened carefully; two or three large white dishes, like "wash bowls" botanist's "drying paper;" or common blotting paper; pieces of cotton cloth, old cotton is the best; and the necessary cards or paper for mounting the plants on.

== See also ==
- History of phycology
- Phycology
