= Pornichet =

Pornichet Pornizhan (Breton)
- Commune
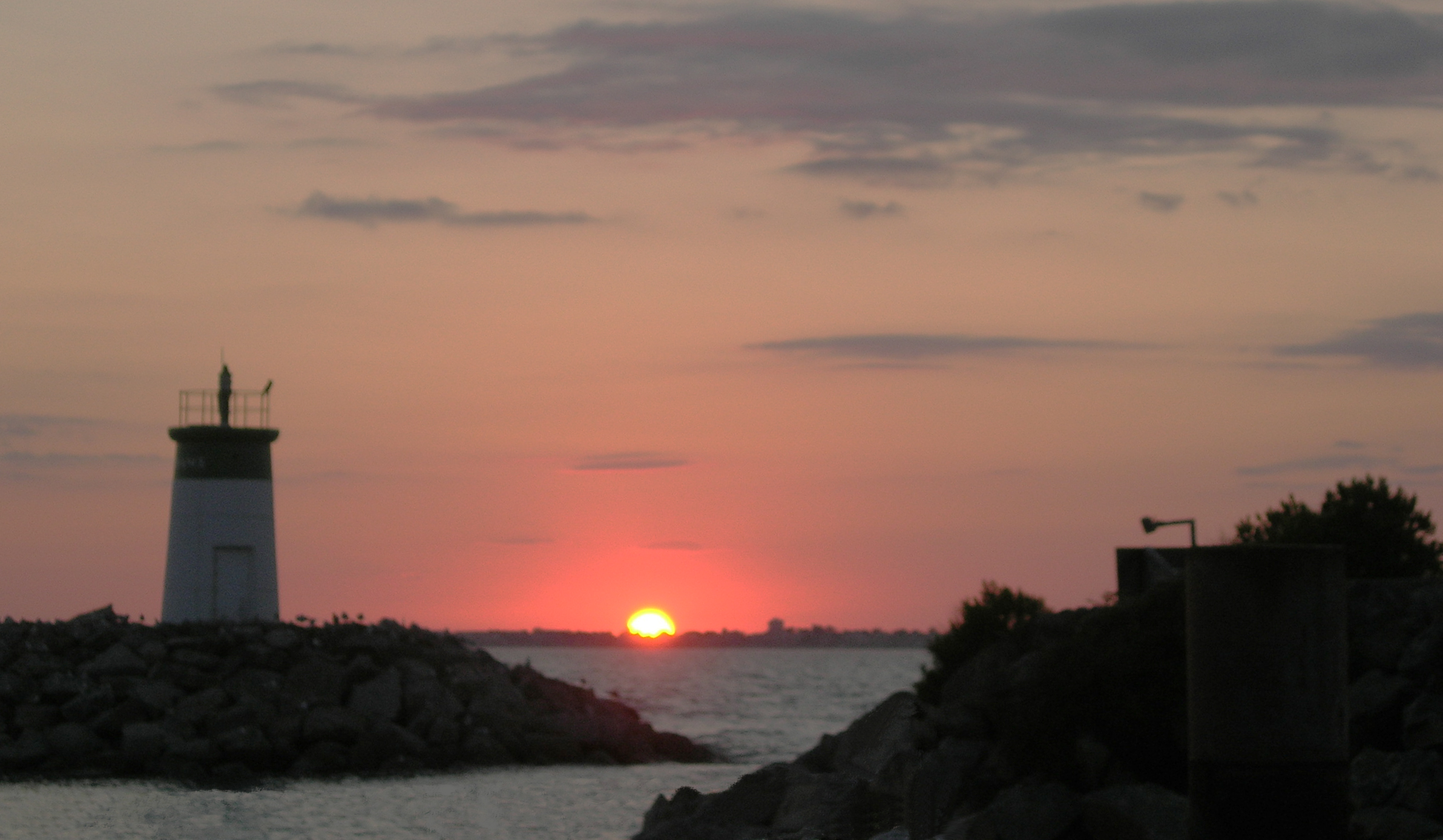
- Port

- Coat of arms
- Location of Pornichet
- Location within France Location within Pays de la Loire
- Coordinates: 47°16′39″N 2°20′20″W
- Country: France
- Region: Pays de la Loire
- Department: Loire-Atlantique
- Arrondissement: Saint-Nazaire
- Intercommunality: CA Région Nazairienne et Estuaire

Government
  - Mayor (2020–2026): Jean-Claude Pelleteur
- Area^{1}: 12.67 km^{2} (4.89 sq mi)
- Highest elevation: 44 m (144 ft)
- Lowest elevation: 0 m (0 ft)
- Population (2023): 12,800
  - Density: 1,010/km^{2} (2,620/sq mi)
- Time zone: UTC+01:00 (CET)
  - Summer (DST): UTC+02:00 (CEST)
- INSEE/Postal code: 44132 /44380
- ^{1} French Land Register data, which excludes lakes, ponds, glaciers > 1 km^{2} (0.386 sq mi or 247 acres) and river estuaries.

Pornichet (French pronunciation: [pɔʁniʃɛ]; Breton: Pornizhan) is a commune in the Loire-Atlantique department in western France.

== Geography ==
=== Location ===
Pornichet is a coastal town of the Côte d'Amour, located ten kilometers west of the centre of Saint-Nazaire. The adjacent communes are Saint-Nazaire and La Baule-Escoublac.

=== Physical geography ===
The town of Pornichet is located

- on the line sillon de Guérande, orientated NW-SE; the town border is located on the Route de Guérande, D392d, at approximately 4 km from the shore, at a place called Pont de Terre (railway junction) at the Quatre Vents;
- on a coastal rock belt located upfront of the sillon de Guérande (same orientation), between two rock heads, the Pointe du Bec and the Pointe de la Lande (border with Saint-Nazaire), separated of 4.25 km;
- on sandy terranes part of the sand dune unit of Escoublac, between the place named Mazy (border with La Baule-Escoublac) and the Pointe du Bec (length: 2 km; width: 100 m at Mazy, 1 km at the head);
- on former swamp area (racetrack).

The lowest altitude (except shoreline) is of 4 m at the racetrack. The dune behind the beach of the Libraires reaches 9 m. The cliffs of Bonne Source and Sainte-Marguerite can reach 12 m. Going inland, altitudes progressively increase up to 44 m. The highest point is located in the hamlet called Ville ès Blais.

=== Shore and beaches ===
Pornichet has three beaches: in the West, the Beach of the Libraires (plage des Libraires), of 2 km length, is part of the Bay of Pouliguen (baie du Pouliguen), shared with La Baule; the border is marked by the Mazy creek (currently underground). In the East, between the Pointe du Bec and the Pointe de la Lande, are located the beaches of Bonne-Source (2.5 km) and Sainte-Marguerite (1.5 km), separated by a rocky head called the Pointe de Congrigoux.

=== Waterfront renovation ===
Since 2021, Pornichet has begun to renovate different parts of the city, in particular the waterfront.

== Toponymy ==
The name of Pornichet comes from Port Niché, which could be translated into Nested Port. The town is named following its principal characteristic of a port located in an alcove along a salt-work channel, which was connecting the salt-works (current racetrack) and the bay.

== History ==
The commune of Pornichet was created in 1900 from parts of Saint-Nazaire and La Baule-Escoublac.

Situated on the shores of the Atlantic Ocean, the area that will become Pornichet developed in the middle of the 19th century with seaside tourism, as evidenced by its original villas, some of which have escaped the destruction caused by urbanization.

== Population ==
Historical population

Year	Pop.	±% p.a.
1901	1,337	—
1906	1,430	+1.35%
1911	1,705	+3.58%
1921	1,918	+1.18%
1926	2,407	+4.65%
1931	2,697	+2.30%
1936	2,691	−0.04%
1946	7,604	+10.95%
1954	6,014	−2.89%
1962	5,242	−1.70%

Year	Pop.	±% p.a.
1968	5,400	+0.50%
1975	5,521	+0.32%
1982	7,266	+4.00%
1990	8,133	+1.42%
1999	9,668	+1.94%
2007	10,442	+0.97%
2012	10,323	−0.23%
2017	10,669	+0.66%
2023	12,800	+3.08%

Source: EHESS and INSEE (1968–2023)

== Sister cities ==
- Bexbach (Germany)
- San Vicente de la Barquera (Spain)

== See also ==
- Communes of the Loire-Atlantique department
- La Baule - Guérande Peninsula
- Parc naturel régional de Brière
