= Vasculum =

Container used to transport plant specimens

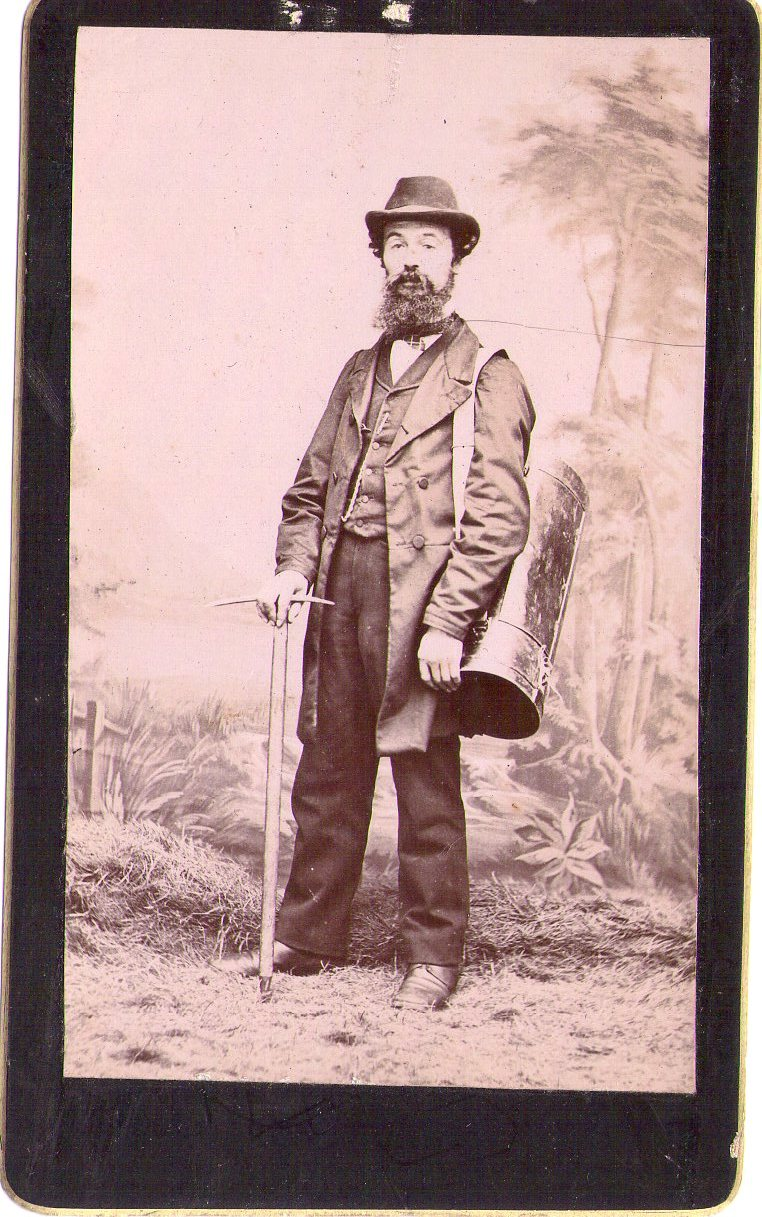
Botanist Justin Paillot with a vasculum

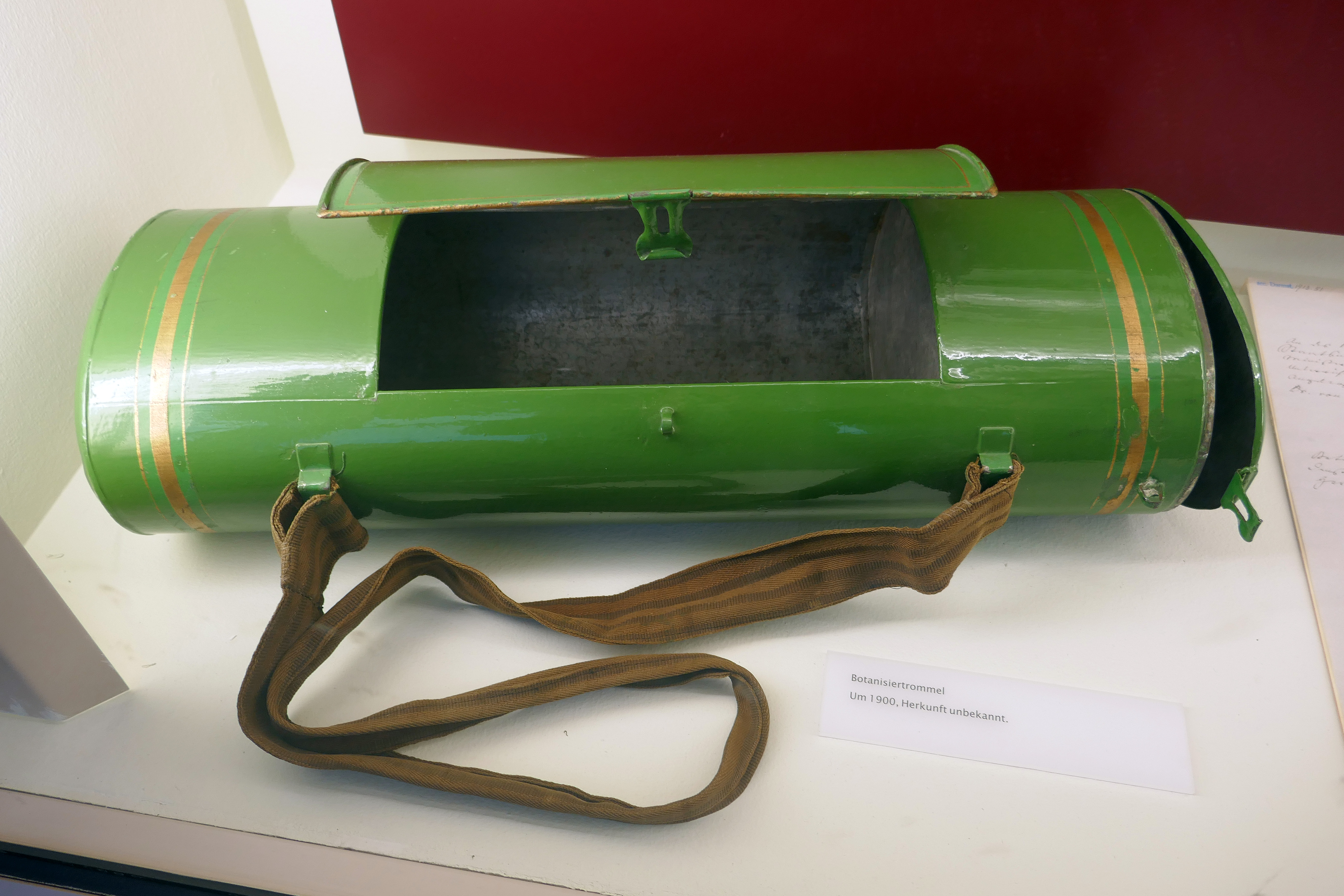
Vasculum

A vasculum or a botanical box is a stiff container used by botanists to keep field samples viable for transportation. The main purpose of the vasculum is to transport plants without crushing them and by maintaining a cool, humid environment.

== Construction ==
Vascula are cylinders typically made from tinned and sometimes lacquered iron, though wooden examples are known. The box was carried horizontally on a strap so that plant specimens lie flat and lined with moistened cloth. Traditionally, British and American vascula were somewhat flat and valise-like with a single room, while continental examples were more cylindrical and often longer, sometimes with two separate compartments. Access to the interior is through one (sometimes two) large lids in the side, allowing plants to be put in and taken out without bending or distorting them unnecessarily. This is particularly important with wildflowers, which are often fragile.

Some early 20th century specimens are made from sheet aluminium rather than tin, but otherwise follow the 19th century pattern. The exterior is usually left rough, or lacquered green.

== History ==
The roots of the vasculum are lost in time, but may have evolved from the 17th century tin candle-box of similar construction. Linnaeus called it vasculum dillenianum, from Latin vasculum – small container and dillenianum, referring to J.J. Dillenius, Linnaeus' friend and colleague at Oxford Botanic Garden. With the rise of botany as a scientific field the mid 18th century, the vasculum became an indispensable part of the botanist's equipment.

Together with the screw-down plant press, the vasculum was popularized in Britain by naturalist William Withering around 1770. The shortened term "vasculum" appears to have become the common name applied to them around 1830. Being a hallmark of field botany, vascula were in common use until World War II . With post-war emphasis on systematics rather than alpha taxonomy and new species often collected in far-away places, field botany and the use of vascula went into decline.

Aluminium vascula are still made and in use, though zipper bags and clear plastic folders are today cheaper and more common in use.

== The Vasculum ==
The Vasculum was "An Illustrated Quarterly dealing primarily with the Natural History of Northumberland and Durham and the tracts immediately adjacent," from 1915 to 2015.

The newsletter of the Society of Herbarium Curators is named "The Vasculum" since 2006.
