= Plant press =

Equipment used to preserve botanical specimens

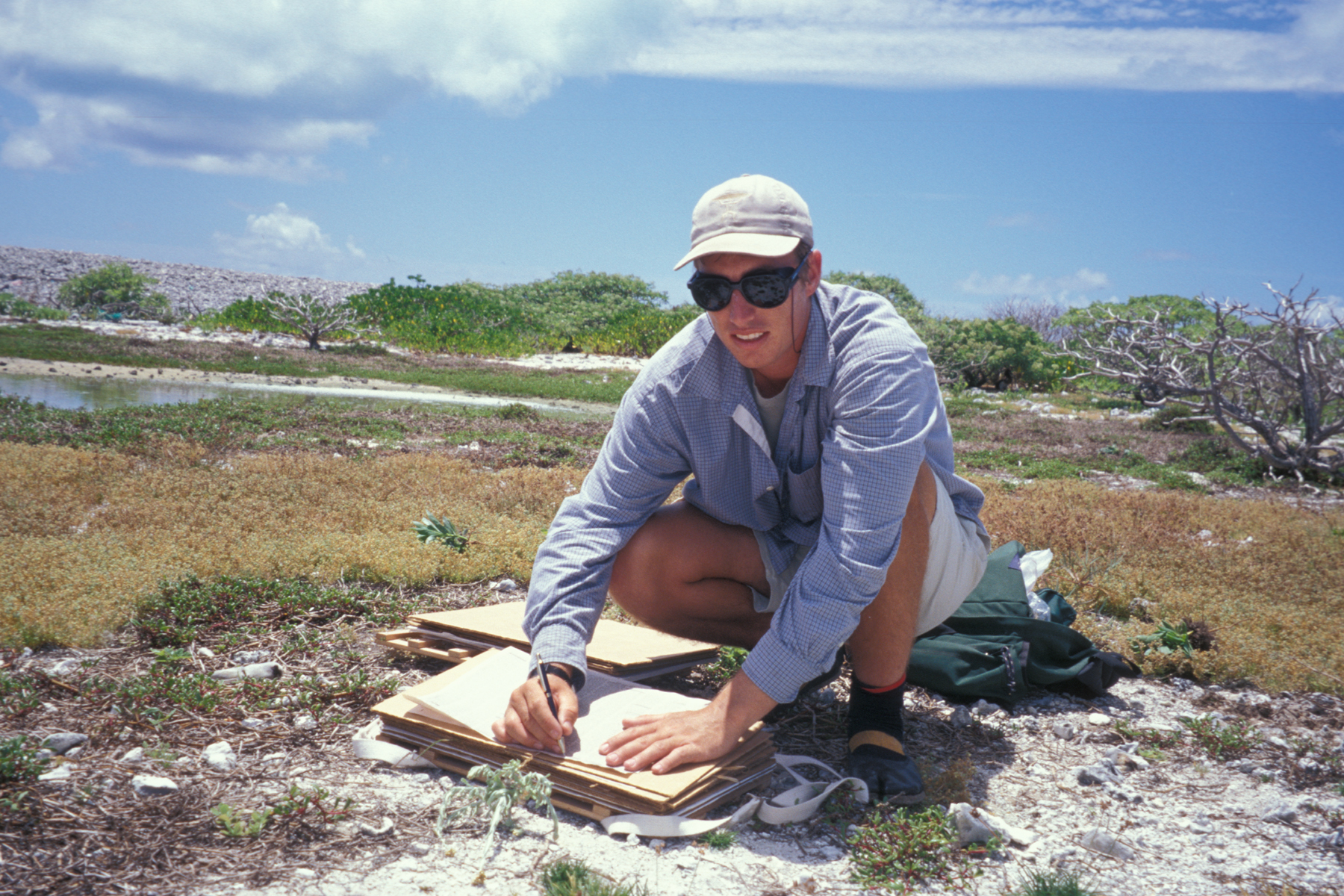
Using a plant press on a collecting trip

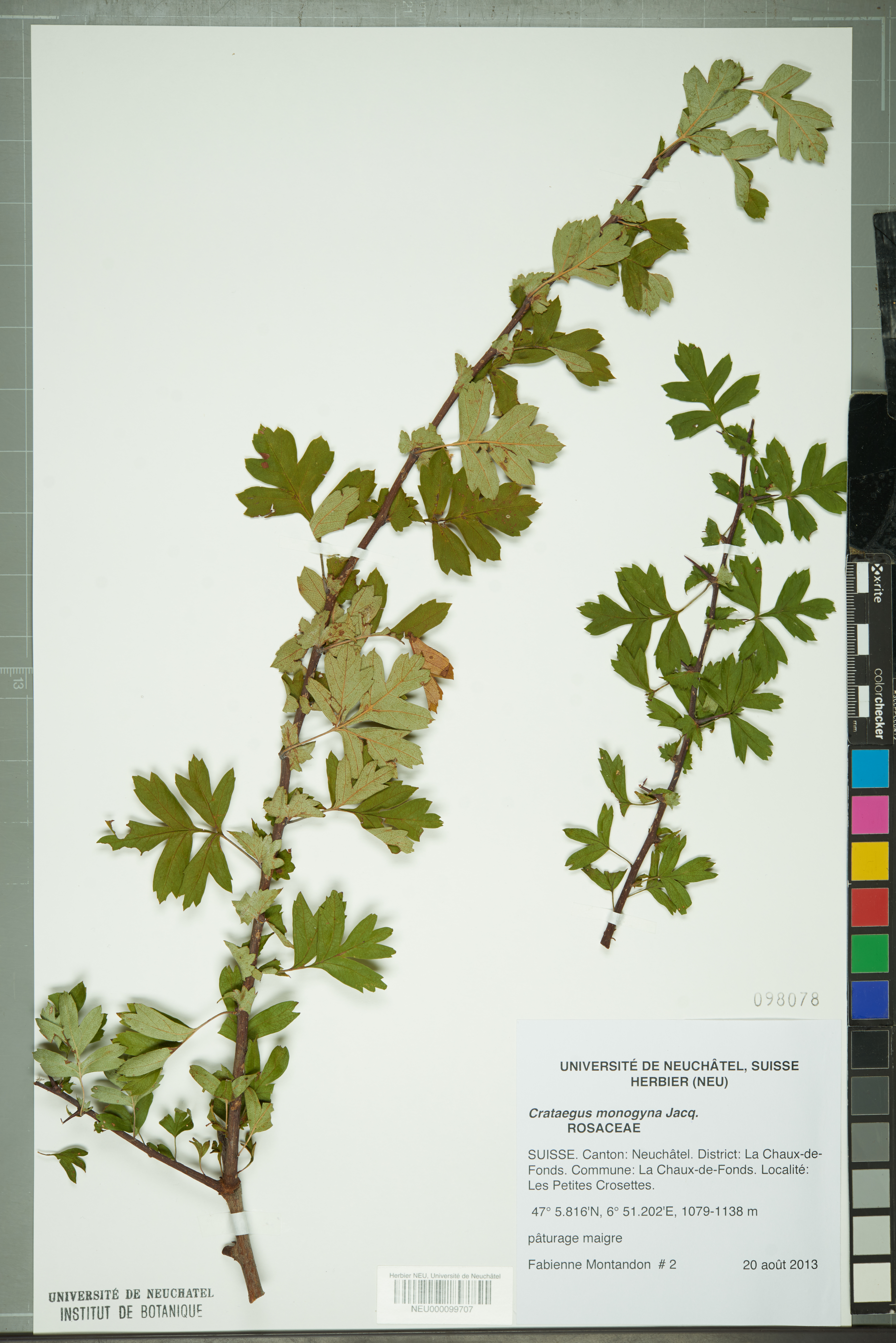
Specimens prepared in a plant press are later glued to card stock with their labels, and are filed in a herbarium.

A plant press is a piece of equipment used by botanists to flatten and dry specimens so that they can be preserved in herbaria. A professional plant press is made to the standard maximum size for specimens to be filed in a particular herbarium. A flower press is a similar device of no standard size that is used to make flat dried flowers for pressed flower craft.

Specimens prepared in a plant press are later glued to archival-quality paper with their labels, and are filed in a herbarium. Labels are made with archival ink (or pencil) and paper, and attached with archival-quality glue.

== Construction ==
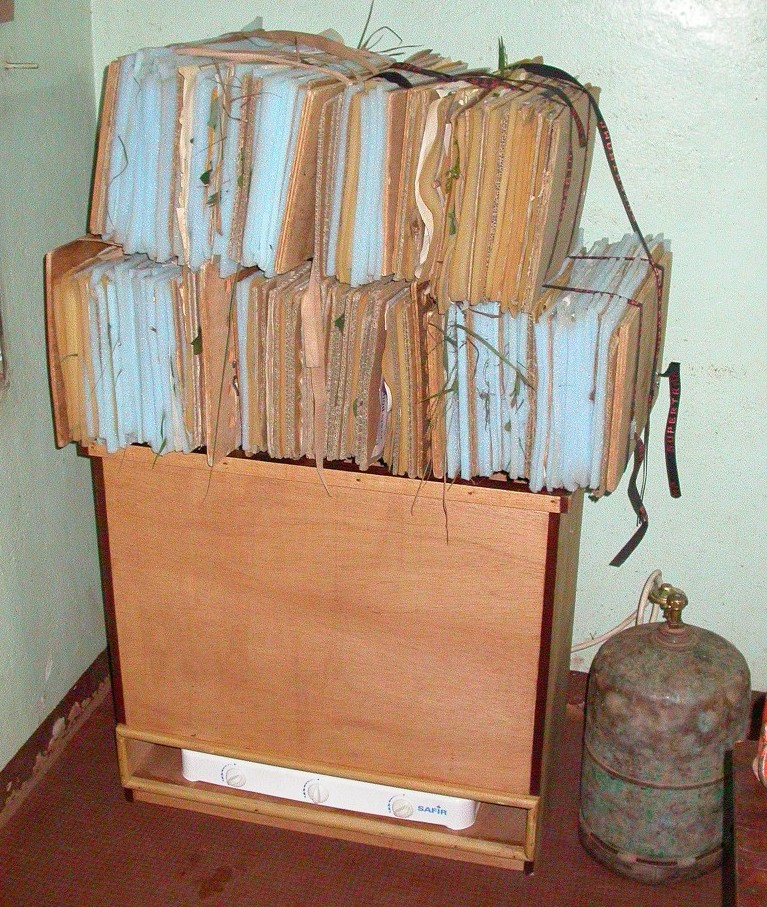
Filled plant presses arranged on a gas-fired heater, with air circulation upwards through the layers

A modern plant press consists of two strong outer boards with straps that can be tightened around them to exert pressure. Between the boards, fresh plant samples are placed, positioned as they will be mounted in the herbarium, carefully labelled, between layers of paper. Further layers of absorbent paper and corrugated cardboard are usually added to help dry the samples as quickly as possible, which prevents decay and improves colour retention. Layers of a sponge material can be used in order to prevent squashing parts of the specimens, such as fruit. Older plant presses and some modern flower presses have screws to supply the pressure, which often limits the thickness of the stack of samples that can be put into one press.

== History ==
Luca Ghini (1490—1556), an Italian physician and botanist, created the first recorded herbarium, and is considered the first person to have used drying under pressure to prepare a plant collection.

William Withering English botanist, geologist, chemist and physician wrote popular books on British botany, and by describing the screw-down plant press (and the vasculum) he brought it to the attention of amateur naturalists in Britain around 1771.
