= William Meade Prince =

American illustrator

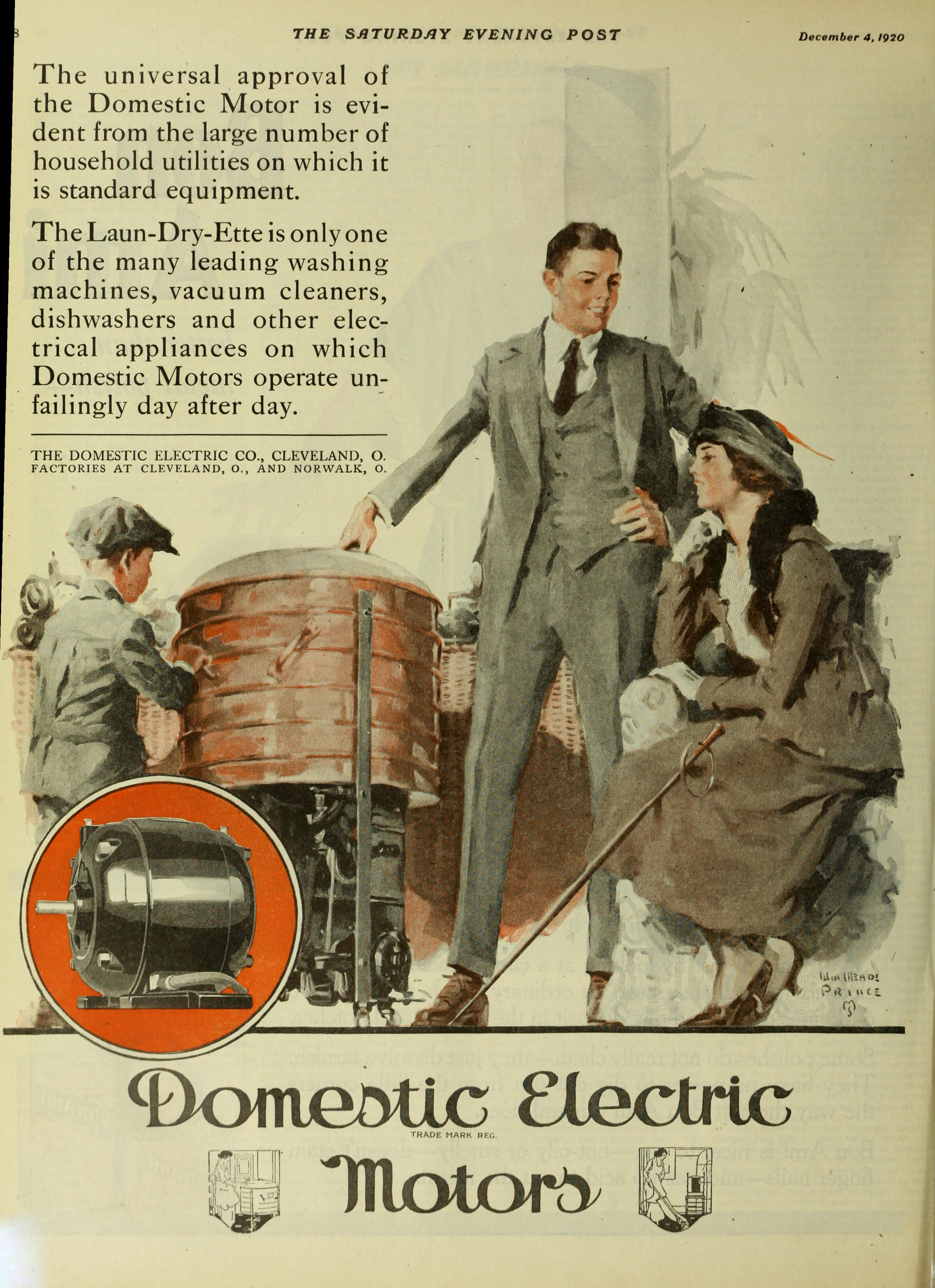
An advertisement illustrated by Prince in The Saturday Evening Post, 1920.

William Meade Prince (July 9, 1893 – November 10, 1951) was an American magazine illustrator of the 1920s and 1930s. The William Meade Prince and Lillian Hughes Prince Papers form part of the Southern Historical Collection of the University of North Carolina. His artistic estate was donated to the permanent collection of the Ackland Art Museum in 1962.

== Selected publications ==
- Miss Couch and the Scamps (1938) (illustrator)
- The Southern Part of Heaven (1950) (author and illustrator)
