= List of alumni of the National and Kapodistrian University of Athens =

This is a list of alumni, former staff, and those otherwise associated with the National and Kapodistrian University of Athens. This list is not complete.

== Heads of state or government ==
- Nicos Anastasiades (b. 1946), President of Cyprus (since 2013)
- Constantine II (1940–2023), King of the Hellenes (1964–1973)
- Panagiotis Kanellopoulos (1902–1986), Prime Minister of Greece (1945; 1967)
- Konstantinos Karamanlis (1907–1998), President of Greece (1980–1985; 1990–1995) and Prime Minister of Greece (1955–1958; 1958–1961; 1961–1963; 1974–1980)
- Kostas Karamanlis (b. 1956), Prime Minister of Greece (2004–2009)
- Spyros Markezinis (1909–2000), Prime Minister of Greece (1973)
- Konstantinos Mitsotakis (1918–2017), Prime Minister of Greece (1990–1993)
- Alexandros Papanastasiou (1876–1936), Prime Minister of Greece (1924; 1932)
- Andreas Papandreou (1919–1996), Prime Minister of Greece (1981–1989; 1993–1996)
- Georgios Papandreou (1888–1968), Prime Minister of Greece (1944–1945; 1963; 1964–1965)
- Karolos Papoulias (1929–2021), President of Greece (2005–2015)
- Georgios Rallis (1918–2006), Prime Minister of Greece (1980–1981)
- Ioannis Rallis (1878–1946), Prime Minister of Greece (1943–1944)
- Michail Stasinopoulos (1903–2002), President of Greece (1974–1975)
- Vassiliki Thanou-Christophilou (b. 1950), Prime Minister of Greece (2015) and President of the Court of Cassation (since 2015)
- Charilaos Trikoupis (1832–1896), Prime Minister of Greece (1875; 1878; 1880; 1882–1885; 1886–1890; 1892–1893; 1893–1895)
- Konstantinos Tsatsos (1899–1987), President of Greece (1975–1980)
- Eleftherios Venizelos (1864–1936), Prime Minister of Greece (1910–1915; 1915; 1917–1920; 1924; 1928–1932; 1932; 1933) and Prime Minister of the Cretan State (1910)
- Xenophon Zolotas (1904–2004), Prime Minister of Greece (1989–1990) and Governor of the Bank of Greece (1944–1945; 1955–1967; 1974–1981)

== Politics and government ==
=== Greece ===
- Panagiotis Adraktas (b. 1948), New Democracy MP
- Georgios Alogoskoufis (b. 1955), Minister of the Economy and Finance (2004–2008)
- Sia Anagnostopoulou (b. 1959), Alternate Minister of Education, Research and Religious Affairs (since 2015)
- Dora Bakoyannis (b. 1954), Minister for Foreign Affairs (2006–2009) and Mayor of Athens (2003–2006)
- Thodoris Dritsas (b. 1947), Minister of Shipping and Island Policy (since 2015)
- Nikos Filis (b. 1960), Minister of Education, Research and Religious Affairs (since 2015)
- Fofi Gennimata (b. 1964), President of PASOK (since 2015)
- Giorgos Kaminis (b. 1954), Mayor of Athens (since 2010)
- Georgios Katrougalos (b. 1963), Minister of Labour, Social Insurance and Social Solidarity (since 2015)
- Giorgos Stathakis (b. 1953), Minister of Economy, Development and Tourism (since 2015)

=== World ===
- Frances Lanitou, Ambassador of the Republic of Cyprus to countries including Belgium, Bosnia and Herzegovina, China, Hungary, the Grand Duchy of Luxembourg, Moldova and the Netherlands
- Roula Mavronicola (b. 1957), Cypriot member of parliament
- Kyriakos Mavronikolas (b. 1955), Cypriot Minister of Defence (2003–2006)
- Sotos Zackheos (b. 1950), Special Envoy of the President of Cyprus to Russia (since 2013)

== Law and the judiciary ==
- Nikos Alivizatos (b. 1949), legal scholar and Minister of the Interior, Public Administration and Decentralization (2004)
- Basil Markesinis (b. 1944), legal scholar

== Religion and theology ==
=== Greece ===
- Saint Nectarios of Aegina (1846–1920), Bishop of Pentapolis and Wonderworker of Aegina
- Chrysostomos Savvatos (b. 1961), Bishop of Messenia

== Science, mathematics and medicine ==
- Ioannis Papadakis (1820-1876) mathematician, astronomer
- Vassilios Lakon (1831–1900), mathematician, Lakon’s Axioms
- Konstantinos M. Mitsopoulos (1844-1911), geologist
- John Hazzidakis (1844-1921), mathematician, Hazzidakis transform
- Timoleon Argyropoulos (1847-1912), physicist
- Cyparissos Stephanos (1857-1917), mathematician, Desmic system
- Elly Agallidis (1914–2006), physicist/physical chemist
- Benediktos Adamantiades (1875–1962), ophthalmologist
- Andreas Anagnostakis (1827–1896), physician
- Constantin Carathéodory (1873–1950), mathematician
- Gerasimos Danilatos (b. 1946), physicist and inventor of the ESEM
- Sophia Frangou, psychiatrist
- Fotis Kafatos (1940–2017), biologist and President of the European Research Council (2005–2010)
- George Kollias (b. 1958), biologist
- Nikos Logothetis (b. 1950), neuroscientist
- Dimitri Nanopoulos (b. 1948), physicist
- Nikolaos Papadopoulos (b. 1965), doctor
- Georgios Papanikolaou (1883–1962), doctor and inventor of the Pap test
- Iphigenia Photaki (1921–1983), organic chemist
- Irini Sereti, scientist, physician, and chief of the HIV pathogenesis section at the National Institute of Allergy and Infectious Diseases.
- Panayotis Varotsos (b. 1947), physicist
- Leonidas Zervas (1902–1980), organic chemist known for the Bergmann-Zervas synthesis
- Vasilis Fthenakis, chemical engineer and environmental scientist

== Philosophy, history and archaeology ==
- Helene Ahrweiler (1926–2026), Byzantinologist
- Manolis Andronikos (1919–1992), archaeologist
- Anna Apostolaki (1880-1968), archaeologist and museum curator
- Vladimir Beneshevich (1874–1938), historian
- Cornelius Castoriadis (1922–1997), philosopher
- Takis Fotopoulos (b. 1940), philosopher
- Emmanuel Kriaras (1906–2014), philologer
- Angeliki Laiou (1941–2008), Byzantinologist
- Nelly Tsouyopoulos (1930–2005), medical historian and academic

== Literature and journalism ==
- Stephanos Constantinides (born 1941), Cyprus, Canadian scholar
- Odysseas Elytis (1911–1996), poet and recipient of the 1979 Nobel Prize in Literature
- Nikos Engonopoulos (1903–1985), poet and painter
- Nikos Gatsos (1911–1992), poet and lyricist
- Kostas Karyotakis (1896–1928), poet
- Nikos Kazantzakis (1883–1957), writer
- Kostis Palamas (1859–1943), poet and co-founder of the New Athenian School
- Lefteris Papadopoulos (b. 1935), lyricist
- Giorgos Seferis (1900–1971), poet and recipient of the 1963 Nobel Prize in Literature
- Angelos Sikelianos (1884–1951), poet and playwright
- Stefanos Tassopoulos (1939-2013), poet and playwright
- Nanos Valaoritis (1921–2019), writer
- Kostas Varnalis (1884–1974), poet
- Dinesh Weerawansa (b. 1966), Editor-in-Chief of the Sri Lankan Sunday Observer (2006–2014)

== Culture and sports ==
- Thanos Mikroutsikos (1947–2019), composer
- Lakis Nikolaou (b. 1949), footballer

== Archaeology ==
- Sofia Voutsaki, Bronze Age Aegean archaeologist
