= Konstantinidis =

The surname Constantinidis, Constantinides, Konstantinidis, Konstantinides (Greek: Κωνσταντινίδης) is a patronymic surname which literally means "the son of Konstantinos (Constantinos, Kostas, Costas)". It may refer to the following notable people:

- Alexandros Konstantidis (born 1988), Greek footballer
- Anthony G. Constantinides (born 1943), professor
- Aris Konstantinidis (1913–1993), a Greek architect
- Aristidis Konstantinidis, Greek racing cyclist
- Billy Konstantinidis (born 1986), Greek-Australian footballer
- Charly Konstantinidis (born 1985), Belgian footballer
- Costa Constantinides (born 1975), Council member for the 22nd District of the New York City Council
- Dimitris Konstantinidis (born 1994), Greek footballer
- Dinos Constantinides (1929–2021), Greek-American composer
- Fotis Konstantinidis (born 1978), Greek footballer
- George Constantinides (born 1947), American economist
- Konstantinos Konstantinidis (1856–1930), Greek merchant
- Kostas Konstantinidis (born 1972), Greek footballer
- Melina Eleni Kanakaredes Constantinides (born 1967), American actress
- Pantelis Konstantinidis (born 1975), Greek footballer
- Sotiris Konstantinidis (born 1977), Greek footballer
- Stephanos Constantinides (born 1941), Canadian scholar
- Sylvia Constantinidis (born 1962), Venezuelan-American pianist
- Thucydides Konstantinides, birth name of Archbishop Michael of America

== See also ==
- Constantinidi
