= Nikolaos Apostolidis =

Greek university professor academic

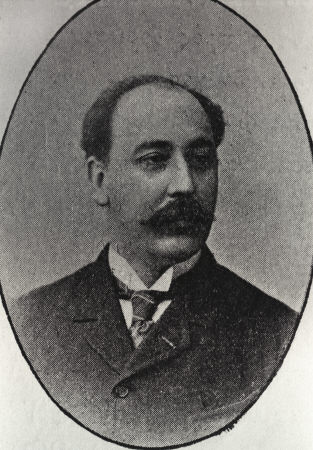

Dean of the School of Philosophy (University of Athens)
- In office 1901–1902
- Preceded by: Pavlos Karolidis
- Succeeded by: Margaritis Evangelidis

Rector of the (University of Athens)
- In office 1909–1910

Minister of Economics
- In office 1916–1917

Personal details
- Born: 1856 Volos, Greece
- Died: 1919 (aged 62–63) Athens, Greece
- Spouse: Sophia Petrou Kiappe
- Children: Alexandra; Christos; Iosif
- Profession: Professor, Dean
- Known for: Naturalism in Greece; Zoological Labs (University of Athens)
- Scientific career
- Education: University of Athens; University of Geneva; Sorbonne University
- Fields: Natural History; Zoology; Biology
- Workplaces: University of Athens

Nikolaos Apostolidis (Greek:Νικόλαος Αποστολίδης; 1856 - 1919), was a biologist, naturalist, professor, dean, author, and politician. He replaced Iraklis Mitsopoulos as the second director of the Zoological Museum of the University of Athens. He served as Dean of the Philosophical School, Rector of the University of Athens, and Minister of Economics. He popularized natural science and was one of the most prolific Greek naturalists of the 20th century. He studied countless species of animals.

Nikolaos was born in Volos to the aristocratic family Apostolidis. He migrated to Athens to attend school and eventually studied at the University of Athens, University of Geneva, and the Sorbonne University. He completed his doctoral studies at the Sorbonne in the field of natural science under the supervision of Henri de Lacaze-Duthiers. He returned to Greece and became a high school teacher and professor at the University of Athens. He expanded the Laboratory of Zoology at the Zoological Museum which was part of the University of Athens and published several scientific papers on zoology while introducing systematic experimental zoology to Greece. He died in Athens in 1919.

== Biography ==
He was born in Volos in 1856 to the aristocratic family Apostolidis. He was the son of Christos Apostolidis and he had 3 brothers Pericles, Margaritis, and Aristides. Nikolaos eventually married Sophia Petrou Kiappe the great-granddaughter of German surgeon Heinrich Treiber. Treiber actively participated in the Greek War of Independence as a surgeon and was one of the doctors who fought for the life of the English poet Lord Byron. Treiber later became the private doctor of King Otto and one of the first medical professors at the University of Athens. He remained in Greece for the rest of his life. Sophia and Nikolaos had three children Alexandra, Christos and Iosif. Christos became a doctor.

Nikolaos completed his primary education in Athens and studied Physics at the University of Athens. He continued his studies at the University of Geneva from 1877 – 1879 and eventually migrated to Paris where he studied zoology at the Sorbonne University with Henri de Lacaze-Duthiers. In 1881, he was awarded a doctorate degree and his thesis was entitled Anatomy and Embryology of Ophiurs. He returned to Greece one year later and became professor of zoology while also teaching natural history at the local high school. He continued his research on ophiurs in echinoderms.

By September 1894, he was appointed full professor of zoology at the University of Athens, a position he held for 22 years; moreover, he was also director of the Zoological Museum and participated in countless international scientific conferences. By the academic year 1909-1910, he assumed the position of rector of the University of Athens, and six years later around 1916 and 1917, he served as Minister of Economics during the Interim Government of Spyridon Lambros after which he abandoned the post for health reasons. He did extensive research on agricultural zoology and published several scientific papers on zoology, he also introduced systematic experimental zoology to Greece. He significantly expanded the Zoological Museum at the University of Athens and oversaw the Laboratory of Zoology.

== Literary works ==
Books and Articles authored by Nikolaos Apostolidis
Date	Title	Title in English
1881	Anatomie et Dèveloppement des Ophiures	Anatomy and Development of Brittle Stars
1883	La Pèche en Grèce In: Fauna Ichthyologique de Grèce	Fishing in Greece. In: Ichthyological Fauna of Greece,
1892	Το βασίλειον των Ζώων	The Animal Kingdom
1892	Οι Ιχθύες των Γλυκέων Υδάτων της Θεσσαλίας,	The Freshwater Fishes of Thessaly
1894	Ανατομική και Εμβρυολογία των Σκωληκοειδών (vermetidae)	Anatomy and Embryology of Vermetidae
1894	Τα θαλάσσια Ζώα και τα Επιθαλάσσια Εργαστήρια	Sea Animals and Marine Laboratories
1896	Πουλολόγω Αναφερομένων Πτηνών,	Birdwatcher of Listed Birds
1901	Φυσική και βιολογική Ιστορία των Ανωφελών Κωνώπων	Natural and Biological History of Malaria-Carrying Mosquitoes
1904	Τα Ωφέλιμα Πτηνά	The Beneficial Birds
1907	Le Corail Grèc. In: La Grèce Maritime	Greek Coral. In: Maritime Greece
1907	Όρια, Óροι και Διαιρέσεις των εν ταις Θαλάσσαις Διαιτωμένων Ζώων (Πρυτανικός Λόγος)	Limits, Conditions and Divisions of the Animals Fed in the Seas (Rector's Speech)

== Bibliography ==
- Stefanidis, Michail K. (1952). Εθνικόν και Καποδιστριακόν Πανεπιστήμιον Αθηνών Εκατονταετηρίς 1837-1937. Τόμος Ε′, Ιστορία της Φυσικομαθηματικής Σχολής [National and Kapodistrian University of Athens Centenary 1837-1937. Volume V, History of the Faculty of Physics and Mathematics] (PDF). Athens: National and Kapodistrian University of Athens.
- Savaidou, Irini Mergoupi (2010). 'Δημόσιος Λόγος περί Επιστήμης στην Ελλάδα, 1870–1900: Εκλαϊκευτικά Εγχειρήματα στο Πανεπιστήμιο Αθηνών, στους Πολιτιστικούς Συλλόγους και στα Περιοδικά [Public Discourse about Science in Greece, 1870-1900: Population Projects at the University of Athens, in Cultural Associations and Magazines] (PDF). Athens, GR: Department of History and Philosophy of Science of the University of Athens.
- Tampakis, Kostas (2014). "Onwards Facing Backwards: the Rhetoric of Science in Nineteenth-Century Greece". The British Journal for the History of Science. 47 (2): 217–237. doi:10.1017/S000708741300040X. JSTOR 43820483. PMID 24941732.
