= Timoleon Argyropoulos =

Greek university professor

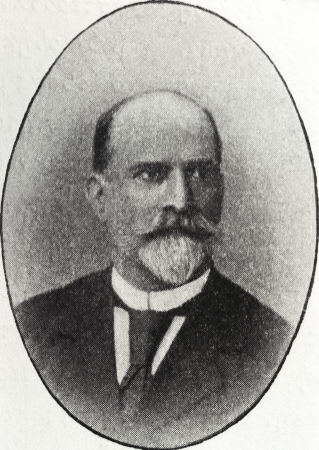
- Argyropoulos in 1896
- Born: 12 April 1847; Athens, Greece
- Died: 16 January 1912 (aged 64); Athens, Greece
- Education: Sorbonne; École des mines de Paris
- Known for: Father of Greek Radiology
- Scientific career
- Fields: Physics, Mathematics
- Workplaces: University of Athens; Evelpidon; Hellenic Naval Academy

Timoleon Argyropoulos (Greek: Τιμολέων Αργυρόπουλος 12 April 1847 - 16 January 1912) was an experimental physicist, mathematician, author and professor. He was a pioneer in modern Greek education. His field of study was electricity and magnetism. He helped develop experimental physics in modern Greek education, and is called the father of Greek radiology.

He replaced Dimitrios Stroumpos as the chair of physics at the University of Athens. Initially, the school of Physics and Mathematics was part of the School of Philosophy. Argyropoulos along with other world-renowned Greek scientists Anastassios Christomanos, Konstantinos M. Mitsopoulos, Spyridon Miliarakis, Nikolaos Apostolidis and Anastasios Damvergis filed a memorandum to the Greek state to separate the schools in the late 1800s. Argyropoulos pioneered the formation of the Department of Physics. He became chair of the physics department on 22 November 1898. He heavily discussed electricity and modern pioneers such as Thomas Edison and Nikola Tesla. He emphasized the modernization and revitalization of the physics department. He published eleven books.

== History ==
He was born in Athens, Greece to Athanassios Argyropoulos and Fanny Frangueska Amallia Kraus. His mother was German. His parents were married at the German Evangelical Community Church in Athens on 27 July 1839. His mother is buried at the Protestant cemetery of Athens but her statue is at the A' Nekrotafeion at her husband's tomb. The couple had eight children. Leonidas, Ourania, Pericles, Timoleon, Dimitrios, Konstantinos, Amalia and Penelope. The last two died at a very young age. He attended the University of Athens. He was sent abroad to study in France. He followed the path of his predecessors Vassilios Lakon and Dimitrios Stroumpos. He studied at the Sorbonne from 1867 to 1871 and then he attended the prestigious French university Ecole des Mines from 1871 to 1874. During that period Henri Poincaré was his classmate. Their professor was world-renowned French Mathematician Charles Hermite. During his academic years, Timoleon began to show an interest in electricity and magnetism. He was a researcher and professor. He obtained a doctorate degree. He married Aikaterini Konofaou. They had two daughters Fani and Maria. In 1881, he attended the International Electrical Congress for the Greek government. He returned to Greece. He was a professor at Evelpidon and the Hellenic Naval Academy. He joined the University of Athens as a Privatdozent in 1884, temporary professor of physics in 1885, and a full professor in 1890. Former chair of the physics department Dimitrios Stroumpos died that same year. He became chair of the department on 22 November 1898. He gave a notable speech. The theme was electricity. He revealed that Benjamin Franklin was his personal hero. He also likened modern Greek scientific education to independence. Argyropoulos and Anastassios Christomanos along with other members of the Greek scientific community lobbied to separate the physics and mathematics department from the philosophical school. During 1909-10 he was Dean of the School of Sciences. He died on 16 January 1912. He participated in multiple scientific organizations. He also served as president of the Parnassos Literary Society from 1880 until the end of his life.

== Academic Work ==
Countless scientists proposed theories relative to the new electromagnetic phenomena. Scientists were escaping the philosophical interpretation of the universe and introducing the practical mathematical interpretation of the physical world known as modern physics. Greek education was trapped following Korydalism for over 300 years. Aristotelian and Ptolemaic physics dominated Greek and Italian education. Argyropoulos and his contemporaries in Greece and abroad were part of the new scientific movement introducing new theories and concepts. Argyropoulos was a proponent of Aether theories prior to the development of special relativity. Scientist proposed the existence of a space-filling substance or field as the transmission medium for the propagation of electromagnetic or gravitational forces. Argyropoulos and Greek physicist Vassilios Lakon believed that the absolute vacuum was not possible within the ether. He also introduced the concept of atomic powers. He did not clarify their nature or mode of action. He introduced the notion of power within the quantitative framework. Power described the physical condition of a body combined with the repulsive forces caused by heat.

Argyropoulos also contributed to the field of kinematics. Argyropoulos and his contemporaries began to accept the mathematical approach of kinematics replacing the theoretical qualitative approach dominated by the philosophical interpretation of the universe. Argyropoulos and Lakon introduced a definition for mass. Argyropoulos and Lakon accepted the principle of Earth's rotation proposed by the foucault pendulum. Argyropoulos defined active energy in relation to kinetic energy and potential energy. He also accepted the principle of the conservation of energy. Argyropoulos heavily researched electricity and proposed the concept of providing electric lighting to cities. Lakon incorporated modern concepts of electromagnetism and discussed Oersted, the law of Biot-Savart and the telegraph. Argyropoulos offered a detailed description of crookes tubes, geissler tubes and x-rays.

== Books ==
- History of Electricity Since Ancient Times (1888) (Greek)
- X-ray Fluorescence of Potassium Sodium Platinum Cyanide and Potassium Lithium Platinum Cyanide (1896) (Greek)
- Apparatus of the Difference in Viscosity of Liquids (Greek)
- Double Refraction and Polarization of Light (1891) (Greek)
- Experimental Physics (1891, 1894) (Greek)
- Elements of Physics (1887) (Greek)

== See also ==
- Cyparissos Stephanos
- Constantin Carathéodory
- John Hazzidakis

== Bibliography ==
- Vlahakis, George (2021). Notions of Physics in Natural Philosophy. Newcastle, UK: Cambridge Scholars Publishing. ISBN 978-1847184306.
- Savaidou, Irini Mergoupi (2010). 'Δημόσιος Λόγος περί Επιστήμης στην Ελλάδα, 1870–1900: Εκλαϊκευτικά Εγχειρήματα στο Πανεπιστήμιο Αθηνών, στους Πολιτιστικούς Συλλόγους και στα Περιοδικά [Public Discourse about Science in Greece, 1870-1900: Population Projects at the University of Athens, in Cultural Associations and Magazines] (PDF). Athens, GR: Department of History and Philosophy of Science of the University of Athens.
- Tampakis, Costas (2013). Sciences and religion: Their interaction in the borders of Europe (1832-1915) (PDF). Athens, GR: Colloque International, Europe et Sciences Modernes, Histoire d’un Engendrement Mutuel, Nantes, 21-22/2/2013.
- Harris, William T. (1898). Report of the Federal Security Agency Office of Education Volume 1. Washington D.C.: U.S. Government Printing Office.
- Stefanidou, Micheal K. (1952). Εθνικόν και Καποδιστριακόν Πανεπιστήμιον Αθηνών Εκατονταετηρίς 1837-1937 Ιστορία της Φυσικομαθηματικής Σχολής [National and Kapodistrian University of Athens Centenary 1837-1937 History of the Faculty of Physics and Mathematics] (PDF). Athens, Greece: National and Kapodistrian University of Athens.
