= LTCI =

LTCI may refer to:

- Long term care insurance, an insurance product
- Lymphocyte T-Cell Immune Modulator, an immune regulating polypeptide
- The ICAO code for Van Ferit Melen Airport in Van, Turkey
