= Konstantinos M. Mitsopoulos =

Geologist and University Professor

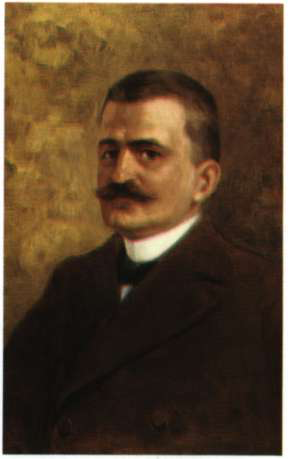
- Born: c. 1844; Patras, Greece
- Died: 1911 (aged 66–67); Athens, Greece
- Education: Freiberg University; University of Athens
- Children: Maximos Mitsopoulos
- Relatives: Iraklis Mitsopoulos
- Awards: Order of the Redeemer
- Scientific career
- Fields: Natural science Geology; Mineralogy; Pyrometallurgy; Metallurgy; Seismology
- Workplaces: University of Athens; Athens Polytechnic
- Doctoral advisors: Hercules Mitsopoulos

Konstantinos M. Mitsopoulos (Greek: Κωνσταντίνος Μ. Μητσόπουλος; c. 1844–1911) was a writer, geologist, mineralogist, chemist, and professor. His uncle Iraklis Mitsopoulos was the father of modern natural sciences in Greece. He followed in his uncle's footsteps, and was the first student to receive a doctorate degree in the natural sciences at the University of Athens in 1868. He was one of the first scientists in Greece to publicly promote Darwin's theory of evolution. He edited and published the periodical known as Prometheus in 1890, promoting Darwinist views. The publication was shut down by the church two years later.

Mitsopoulos was born in Patras. He followed the degree path of natural sciences at the University of Athens during the 1860s. He continued his studies in Germany at the Freiberg University of Mining and Technology. It was one of the leading universities in Europe for geology and mineralogy. Some of his professors included Hieronymous Theodor Richter and Clemens Winkler. He returned to Greece and became a professor at the University of Athens and Athens Polytechnic University. He became dean of the School of Philosophy, president of the University of Athens and the Athens Polytechnic University. He died in Athens in 1911 at the age of 67. He was honored with the Silver Medal of the Order of the Redeemer.

== Biography ==
He was born in Patra in 1844. His uncle was Hercules Anastasios Mitsopoulos. He studied at the University of Athens some of his professors were Dimitrios Stroumpos, Vassilios Lakon, and Anastassios Christomanos. His uncle was the president of the University of Athens at the time. He was the first student to receive a doctorate degree in the natural sciences at the University of Athens in 1868. He graduated with honors and went to the prestigious German mining school Freiberg University from 1868 to 1874. Some of his professors included Hieronymous Theodor Richter, Clemens Winkler, Gustav Zeuner, and Ferdinand Reich. August Meyer was also attending the university at the time. Konstantinos studied physics, chemistry, pyrochemistry, geology, geodesics, metallurgy, mining, mining law, and mechanical engineering for six years. While he was a student Konstantinos and Armin Junge improved the blowing apparatus for blowpipe mining. He returned to Greece in 1875. He focused on geology and mineralogy.

In 1875, at age 31, he became professor of geology and mineralogy at the University of Athens. Ten years later he also began to teach geology and mineralogy at the Athens Polytechnic University. He stayed in this position from 1885 to 1910. In the academic year 1888–1889, he was dean of the School of Philosophy which was part of the University of Athens. He was involved with the academic senate from 1890 to 1900. His uncle died in 1892. His son Maximus Mitsopoulos was born five years later in 1897. He followed in his father's footsteps. He became a well-known geologist and mineralogist. During this period the faculty of the School of Philosophy lobbied to separate the Physics and Mathematics department from the School of Philosophy. Konstantinos signed the petition. He became president of the University of Athens in the academic year 1900–1901. He became the president of the Athens Polytechnic University in 1902. He was 58 years old. He remained in this position until 1910. He also taught at the Industrial and Commercial Academy founded by Greek chemist Othon Roussopoulos. It functioned from 1894 to 1923. Konstantinos was a member of the Greek organizations Parnassos and Hellinismos. He was also editor of the publication called Hellinismos. He participated in a large number of international research projects along with Anastassios Christomanos and Timoleon Argyropoulos. At his funeral, Anastasios Damvergis said he was an "unparalleled popularizer of scientific knowledge and teaching, making the findings common to all of science."

== Literary works ==
Books and Articles authored by Konstantinos Mitsopoulos
Date	Title	Title in English
1863	"Berghütten und Salinenwesen von Griechenland in der National-Ausstellung von Athen"	Mountain Huts and Salines of Greece in the National Exhibition of Athens
1866	Die Erdbeben in Griechenland und der Türkei	The earthquakes in Greece and Turkey
1878	"Studien über die chemische Beschaffenheit des zu Mycenä entdeckten Antiquitäten"	Studies on the chemical nature of the antiquities discovered at Mycenae
1881	Das grosse Erdbeben auf der Insel Zante	The great earthquake on the island of Zante
1882	Die Erdbeben von Theben und Lokris	The earthquakes of Thebes and Locris
1888	Die Erdkeben von Tripolis und Triphylia	The ridges of Tripoli and Triphylia
1888	Περί του αν επικερδείς ή ζημιώδεις αι ισπανικάι κάμινοι των μεταλλουργείων Λαυρίου	On whether the Spanish furnaces of the Lavrio smelters are profitable or unprofitable'
1888	Πραγματεία περί μεταλλουργείων, μεταλλείων, ορυχείων και λατομείων	Treatise on Metallurgy, Mines, Mines and Quarries
1888	Περί του ηλίου	The Sun
1890-1892	Προμηθεύς	Prometheus Scientific Periodical
1896	Εγκυκλοπαιδικόν Λεξικόν Πρακτικών Γνώσεων	Encyclopaedic Dictionary of Practical Knowledge

== Bibliography ==
- Stefanidis, Micheal K. (1952). Εθνικόν και Καποδιστριακόν Πανεπιστήμιον Αθηνών Εκατονταετηρίς 1837-1937 Ιστορία της Φυσικομαθηματικής Σχολής [National and Kapodistrian University of Athens Centenary 1837-1937 History of the Faculty of Physics and Mathematics] (PDF). Athens, Greece: National and Kapodistrian University of Athens.
- Savaidou, Irini Mergoupi (2010). 'Δημόσιος Λόγος περί Επιστήμης στην Ελλάδα, 1870–1900: Εκλαϊκευτικά Εγχειρήματα στο Πανεπιστήμιο Αθηνών, στους Πολιτιστικούς Συλλόγους και στα Περιοδικά [Public Discourse about Science in Greece, 1870-1900: Population Projects at the University of Athens, in Cultural Associations and Magazines] (PDF). Athens, GR: Department of History and Philosophy of Science of the University of Athens.
- Tampakis, Costas (2021). Η Χημεία στην Ελλάδα και το γερμανικό παράδειγμα (1860–1904) [Chemistry in Greece and the German Example (1860–1904)]. Athens, GR: Compendium Summary of the Greek-German crossroads.
- Tampakis, Costas (2013). Sciences and religion: Their interaction in the borders of Europe (1832-1915) (PDF). Athens, GR: Colloque International, Europe et Sciences Modernes, Histoire d’un Engendrement Mutuel, Nantes, 21-22/2/2013.
- Gerlach, Craz (1870). Jahrbuch für den Berg und Hütten Mann auf das Jahr Herausgegeben und Verlegt von der Königl Bergakademie Freiberg [Yearbook of Mining and Geology for the Year 1870 Published by Freiberg University of Mining and Technology]. Saxony, Germany: Freiberg University Publishing.
- Crookes, William (1872). The Chemical News Vol. 25. London, UK: Henry Gillman, Boy Court, Ludgate Hill.
- Lawson, Henry (1872). The Popular Science Review A Quarterly Miscellany of Entertaining and Instructive Articles on Scientific Subjects · Volume 11. London, UK: Robert Hardwicke.
- Tampakis, Kostas (2014). "Onwards Facing Backwards: the Rhetoric of Science in Nineteenth-Century Greece". The British Journal for the History of Science. 47 (2): 217–237. doi:10.1017/S000708741300040X. JSTOR 43820483. PMID 24941732. S2CID 38249251.
