= Nikolaos Hatzidakis =

Greek mathematician (1872–1942)

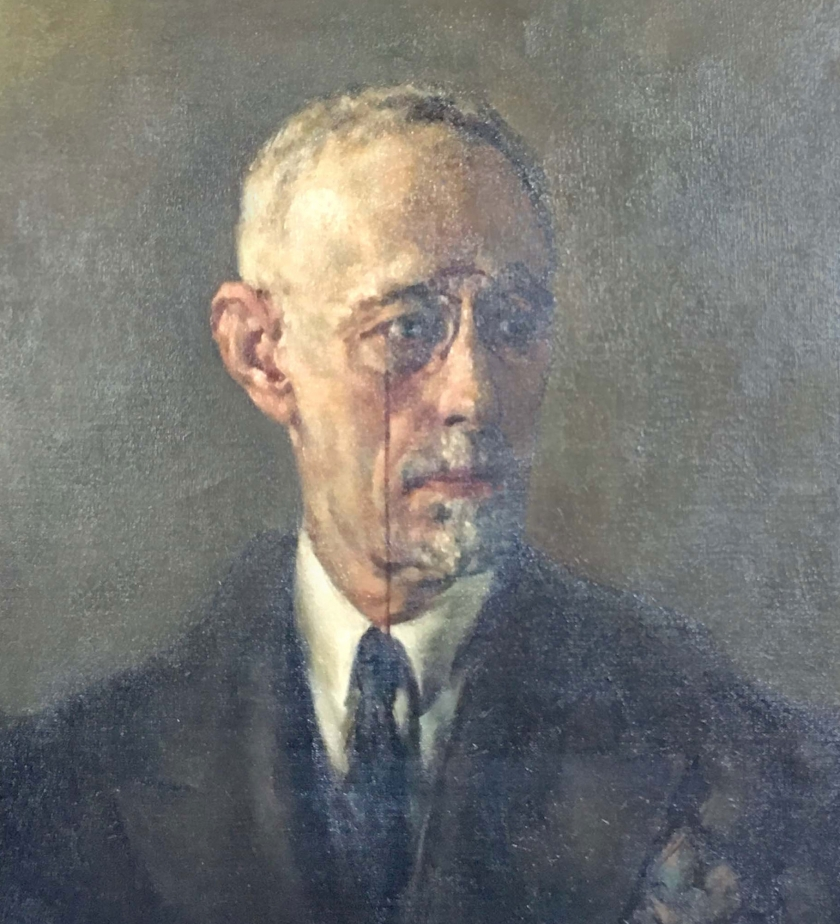

Nikolaos J. Hatzidakis (Νικόλαος Χατζιδάκις, also Nicholas Hadzidakis, 25 April 1872 – 25 January 1942) was a Greek mathematician.

== Biography ==
Hatzidakis was born in 1872 in Berlin. His parents were from Crete. He attended secondary school in Athens and studied mathematics at the National Technical University of Athens where he was awarded a Ph.D. in mathematics. He continued his studies in Paris, Gothenburg and Berlin.

He returned to Greece and was appointed professor of theoretical mechanics and astronomy at the Hellenic Military Academy, where he taught from 1900 to 1904. He was a professor ordinarius of mathematics at the University of Athens from 1904 until his retirement in 1939 as professor emeritus. He also taught at the Hellenic Naval Academy.

He was an internationally recognized expert on the mathematics of the kinematic equations of surfaces and was a founding member of the Hellenic Mathematical Society. He was an Invited Speaker of the International Congress of Mathematicians in 1912 at Cambridge UK, in 1920 at Strasbourg, in 1928 at Bologna, and in 1932 in Zurich.

Nikolaos Hatzidakis was a dedicated Greek patriot. In 1897 during the Greco-Turkish War, he interrupted his studies in Paris to take part in the rebellion against Ottoman rule that had begun in his family's homeland of Crete. During the Axis occupation of Greece in World War II, although he knew German and Italian, he did not cooperate with the occupying powers and died of starvation in the Great Famine, on 25 January 1942 in Athens.

His brother was the linguist Georgios Hatzidakis and his daughter was the writer, translator and critic Foula Hatzidaki (1906–1984). Nikolaos Hatzidakis was interested in literature, linguistics and foreign languages. He published poetry in prestigious journals under a pseudonym and was said to speak thirteen languages. He published mathematical papers in Greek, German, French, English, Italian, and Danish. His father was the noted mathematician Ioannis "John" Hatzidakis (with the last name commonly transliterated as Hazzidakis).

== Selected publications ==
- Hatzidakis, N. J. (1900). "Displacements Depending on One, Two,...., k Parameters in a Space of n Dimensions". American Journal of Mathematics. 22 (2): 154–184. doi:10.2307/2369753. JSTOR 2369753.
- Hatzidakis, N. J. (1901). "Om Centralaksen for Hovedtriedret af en Curve". Nyt Tidsskrift for Matematik. 12: 49–53. JSTOR 24527738.
- Hatzidakis, N. J. (1902). "Om nogle Konsekvenser af Frenel's og Brunel's Formler". Nyt Tidsskrift for Matematik. 13: 49–58. JSTOR 24527933.
- Hatzidakis, N. J. (1903). "Om kurveteoretiske Invarianter". Nyt Tidsskrift for Matematik. 14: 77–82. JSTOR 24528107.
- Hatzidakis, N. J. (1903). "Über partielle Integration". Mathematische Annalen. 57: 134–136. doi:10.1007/BF01449020.
- Hatzidakis, N. (1910). "Zum Aufsatze _{"}Ausdehnung der Frenetschen Formeln und verwandter auf dem R_{n}, von Herrn W. Fr. Meyer^{"} ". Jahresbericht der Deutschen Mathematiker-Vereinigung. 19: 267–269.

== Sources ==
- National and Kapodistrian University of Athens, Mikhail Stefanidis, ed. (1948). Εκατονταετηρίς 1837 - 1937, Τόμος Ε', Ιστορία της Φυσικομαθηματικής Σχολής (Century 1837 - 1937, Volume E, History of Physical and Mathematical School) (in Greek). Αθήναι (Athens): Πυρσός Α.Ε. (Pyrsos, Ltd.). pp. 22–23.
