= Lymphocytopenia =

Lack of lymphocytes in the blood

- Other names: Lymphopenia
- Specialty: Hematology, immunology

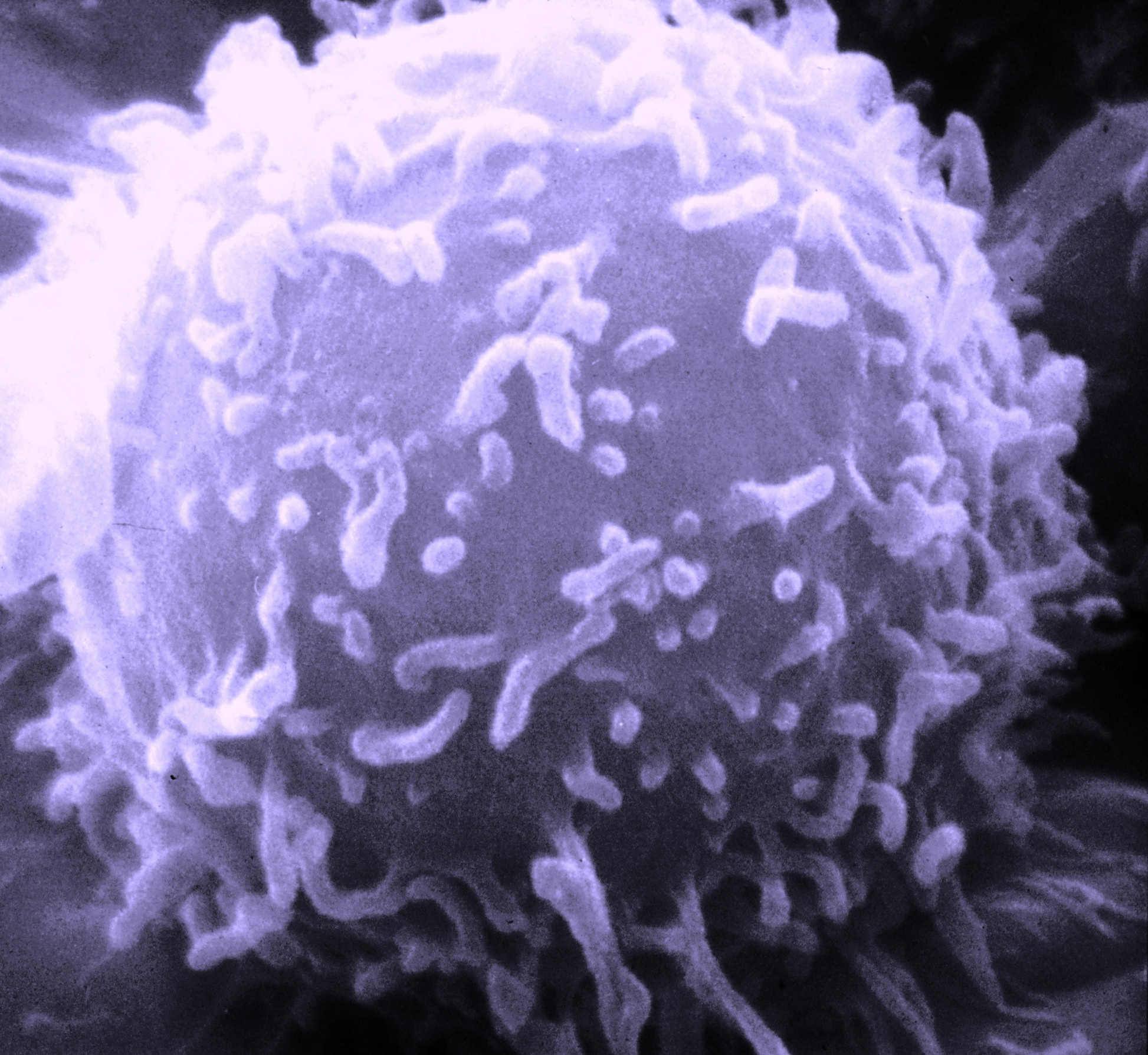
Electron microscopic image of a single human lymphocyte.

Lymphocytopenia is the condition of having an abnormally low level of lymphocytes in the blood. Lymphocytes are a white blood cell with important functions in the immune system. It is also called lymphopenia. The opposite is lymphocytosis, which refers to an excessive level of lymphocytes.

Lymphocytopenia may be present as part of a pancytopenia, when the total numbers of all types of blood cells are reduced.

== Classification ==
In some cases, lymphocytopenia can be further classified according to which kind of lymphocytes are reduced. If all three kinds of lymphocytes are suppressed, then the term is used without further qualification.

- In T lymphocytopenia, there are too few T lymphocytes, but normal numbers of other lymphocytes. It causes, and manifests as, a T cell deficiency. This is usually caused by HIV infection (resulting in AIDS), but may be Idiopathic CD4+ lymphocytopenia (ICL), which is a very rare heterogeneous disorder defined by CD4+ T-cell counts below 300 cells/μL in the absence of any known immune deficiency condition, such as human immunodeficiency virus (HIV) infection or chemotherapy.
- In B lymphocytopenia, there are too few B lymphocytes, but possibly normal numbers of other lymphocytes. It causes, and manifests as, a humoral immune deficiency. This is usually caused by medications that suppress the immune system.
- In NK lymphocytopenia, there are too few natural killer cells, but normal numbers of other lymphocytes. This is very rare.

== Causes ==
Lymphocytopenia is commonly caused by a recent infection, such as COVID-19.

Lymphocytopenia, but not idiopathic CD4+ lymphocytopenia, is associated with corticosteroid use, infections with HIV and other viral, bacterial, and fungal agents, malnutrition, systemic lupus erythematosus, severe stress, intense or prolonged physical exercise (due to cortisol release), rheumatoid arthritis, sarcoidosis, multiple sclerosis, and iatrogenic (caused by other medical treatments) conditions.

Lymphocytopenia is a frequent, temporary result from many types of chemotherapy, such as with cytotoxic agents or immunosuppressive drugs. Some malignancies that have spread to involve the bone marrow, such as leukemia or advanced Hodgkin's disease, also cause lymphocytopenia.

Another cause is infection with Influenza A virus subtype H1N1 (and other subtypes of the Influenza A virus) and is then often associated with Monocytosis; H1N1 was responsible for the Spanish flu, the 2009 flu pandemic and in 2016 for the Influenza-epidemic in Brazil. The SARS disease caused lymphocytopenia. Among patients with laboratory-confirmed COVID-19 in Wuhan China through January 29th, 2020, 83.2 percent had Lymphocytopenia at admission.

Large doses of radiation, such as those involved with nuclear accidents or medical whole body radiation, may cause lymphocytopenia.

== Diagnosis ==
Lymphocytopenia is diagnosed when the complete blood count shows a lymphocyte count lower than the age-appropriate reference interval (for example, below 0.9 billion/L in an adult).

== Other animals ==
Lymphocytopenia caused by Feline Leukemia Virus and Feline immunodeficiency virus retroviral infections is treated with Lymphocyte T-Cell Immune Modulator.
