= Cyparissos Stephanos =

Greek mathematician and university professor (1857–1917)

- Born: May 11, 1857; Kea, Greece
- Died: 27 December 1917 (aged 60); Athens, Greece
- Education: University of Athens; Sorbonne
- Known for: Desmic system Geometry of the Spheres
- Scientific career
- Fields: Mathematics
- Workplaces: University of Athens
- Thesis: Sur la théorie des formes binaires et sur l'élimination (1884)
- Doctoral advisors: Vassilios Lakon; Jean Gaston Darboux

Kyparissos Stefanos (Greek: Κυπάρισσος Στέφανος; May 11, 1857 - December 27, 1917) was a Greek author, mathematician, and professor. He was a pioneer in 20th century projective geometry. He studied with Vassilios Lakon. Stefanos furthered his studies in France following the same path of Timoleon Argyropoulos, Dimitrios Stroumpos, and Vassilios Lakon. In France, Stefanos studied with Jean Gaston Darboux, Camille Jordan, and Charles Hermite. Jean Gaston Darboux was his doctoral advisor. He wrote articles in the fields of mathematical analysis, higher algebra, theoretical mechanics, and topology. He published around twenty-five original works in European journals. He is known for introducing Desmic system.

He received his PhD in 1878 from the National and Kapodistrian University of Athens. In 1879 he became a member of l'Société mathématique de France. In the early 1880s he studied mathematics in Paris and published many papers in various journals. He returned to Greece and in 1884 was appointed honorary professor and in 1890 regular professor at the National and Kapodistrian University of Athens. He was also a professor at the National Technical University of Athens and the Hellenic Naval Academy. Stefanos was an invited speaker at the International Congress of Mathematicians in 1897 at Zurich, in 1900 at Paris, in 1904 at Heidelberg, in 1908 at Rome, and in 1912 at Cambridge (England).

== History ==
Stefanos was born on the island of Kea, where his father worked as a school teacher. His brother was Clon Stefanos, a noted anthropologist. Kyparissos went to school in Syros and pursued studies at the University of Athens. He was awarded a PhD in mathematics in 1878. Stefanos also traveled to Paris and studied at the Sorbonne. His doctoral advisor was Jean Gaston Darboux. He also studied with world-renowned mathematicians Camille Jordan, and Charles Hermite. He obtained a doctorate from the Sorbonne in 1880. His dissertation was On the Theory of Binary Forms and Elimination (Sur la Theorie des Formes Binaires et sur l'Elimination).

While Stefanos was in Paris he met Hermann Schwarz. The two discussed Karl Weierstrass's unpublished work on hypercomplex numbers. Weierstrass had assumed the existence of an element whose powers span the algebra as a vector space; in 1883, Stefanos constructed a three-dimensional counterexample to this assumption. Stefanos returned to Athens in 1884. He became professor at the University of Athens. He also taught at the elite National Technical University of Athens and Evelpidon. He was the rector of the University of Athens 1908-1909.

He represented Greece in countless international mathematical congresses. He was a member of various mathematical societies. He was the founder of the agricultural society. He was the founder and director of the first school of commerce in Athens. He co-founded the Athens Forestry Preservation Society (Φιλοδασικής Εταιρείας) and the Society of Commerce. He was also the organizer and president of the teachers association in Athens.

== Literary works ==
Books and Articles authored by Kyparissos Stefanos
Date	Title	Title in English
1879	Sur les Systèmes Desmiques de Trois Tétraèdres	On the Desmic system of Three Tetrahedrons
1881	Sur une Configuration Remarquable de Cercles Dans L'Espaces	The Configuration of Circles in Space
1882	Sur l’ Intégration d’ une Function Rationnelle Homogéne	Integration of a Homogeneous Rational Function
1883	Sur la Théorie des Formes Binaires et Sur l'Èlimination	Theory of Binary Forms and Elimination
1883	Sur les Relations Qui Existent Entre les Convariants et les Invariants de Caractére Pair d’ Une Forme Binaire du Sixiéme Ordre	On the Relations that Exist Between the Convariants and the Even-Character Invariants of a Sixth-Order Binary Form.
1883	Sur le Systéme Complet des Combinants de Deux Formes Binaires Biquadratiques	On the Complete System of Combinations of two Forms Biquadratic Binaries
1883	Sur un Probléme de la Theorie d’ Èlimination	Theory of Elimination
1900	Sur une Extension du Calcul des Substitutions Linéaires	Extension of Calculus Linear Substitution
1906	Sur les Forces Donnant Lieu à des Trajectories Coniques	The Forces giving Rise to Conical Trajectories

== See also ==
- List of Greek mathematicians

== Bibliography ==
- Stefanidou, Micheal K. (1952). Εθνικόν και Καποδιστριακόν Πανεπιστήμιον Αθηνών Εκατονταετηρίς 1837-1937 Ιστορία της Φυσικομαθηματικής Σχολής [National and Kapodistrian University of Athens Centenary 1837-1937 History of the Faculty of Physics and Mathematics] (PDF). Athens, Greece: National and Kapodistrian University of Athens.
- Volkert, Klaus; Menghini, Marta; Barbin, Évelyne (2019). Descriptive Geometry, The Spread of a Polytechnic Art The Legacy of Gaspard Monge. Cham, Switzerland: Springer International Publishing. ISBN 9783030148089.
- Cajori, Florian (1999), A History of Mathematics, New York: Chelsea, ISBN 978-0-8284-0203-3
- Georgiadou, Maria (2013). Constantin Carathéodory Mathematics and Politics in Turbulent Times. Heidelberg, Germany: Springer. ISBN 9783642185625.
- Lockyer, Sir Norman (October 4, 1900). "Mathematics at the British Association". Nature. 62 (1614).
- Lützen, Jesper (2001). Around Caspar Wessel and the Geometric Representation of Complex Numbers Proceedings of the Wessel Symposium at The Royal Danish Academy of Sciences and Letters, Copenhagen, August 11-15 1998. Invited Papers. Copenhagen, Denmark: C.A. Reitzels. ISBN 9788778762368.
- Stephanos, Cyparissos (1879), "Sur les systèmes desmiques de trois tétraèdres", Bulletin des sciences mathématiques et astronomiques, Série 2, 3 (1): 424–456, JFM 11.0431.01.
- Stephanos, Cyparissos (1900). "Sur une extension du calcul des substitutions linéaires". Journal de Mathématiques Pures et Appliquées. 6: 73–128.
- Stephanos, Cyparissos (1879). "Sur les systèmes desmiques de trois tétraèdres". Bulletin des Sciences Mathématiques et Astronomiques. 3 (1): 424–456.
- Stephanos, Cyparissos (1906). "Sur les forces donnant lieu à des trajectories coniques". Crelle's Journal. 131: 136–151.
- Stephanos, Cyparissos (1881). "Sur une configuration remarquable de cercles dans l'espace". Comptes Rendus. 93: 578–580.
- Skintzopoulou, A.S. (1918). Αρχιμήδης Μηνιαίο Περιοδικό Σύγγραμμα του Ελληνική Πολυτεχνική Συλλόγου Ετος ΙΘ Αριθ. 1 [Archimedes Monthly Journal The Hellenic Polytechnic Society Volume ΙΘ Number 1] (PDF). Athens, Greece: Archimedes Society.
