= Janet K. Yamamoto =

American immunologist

- Known for: co-developed a vaccine for the Feline immunodeficiency virus

Academic background
- Education: BA, University of California, Davis; PhD, Microbiology, 1981, University of Texas Medical Branch

Janet K. Yamamoto is an American immunologist. Yamamoto is a professor of veterinary medicine at the University of Florida where she studies the spread of HIV/AIDS. In 1988, she co-developed a vaccine for the feline version of HIV with Niels C. Pederson and was subsequently elected to the National Academy of Inventors.

== Early life and education ==
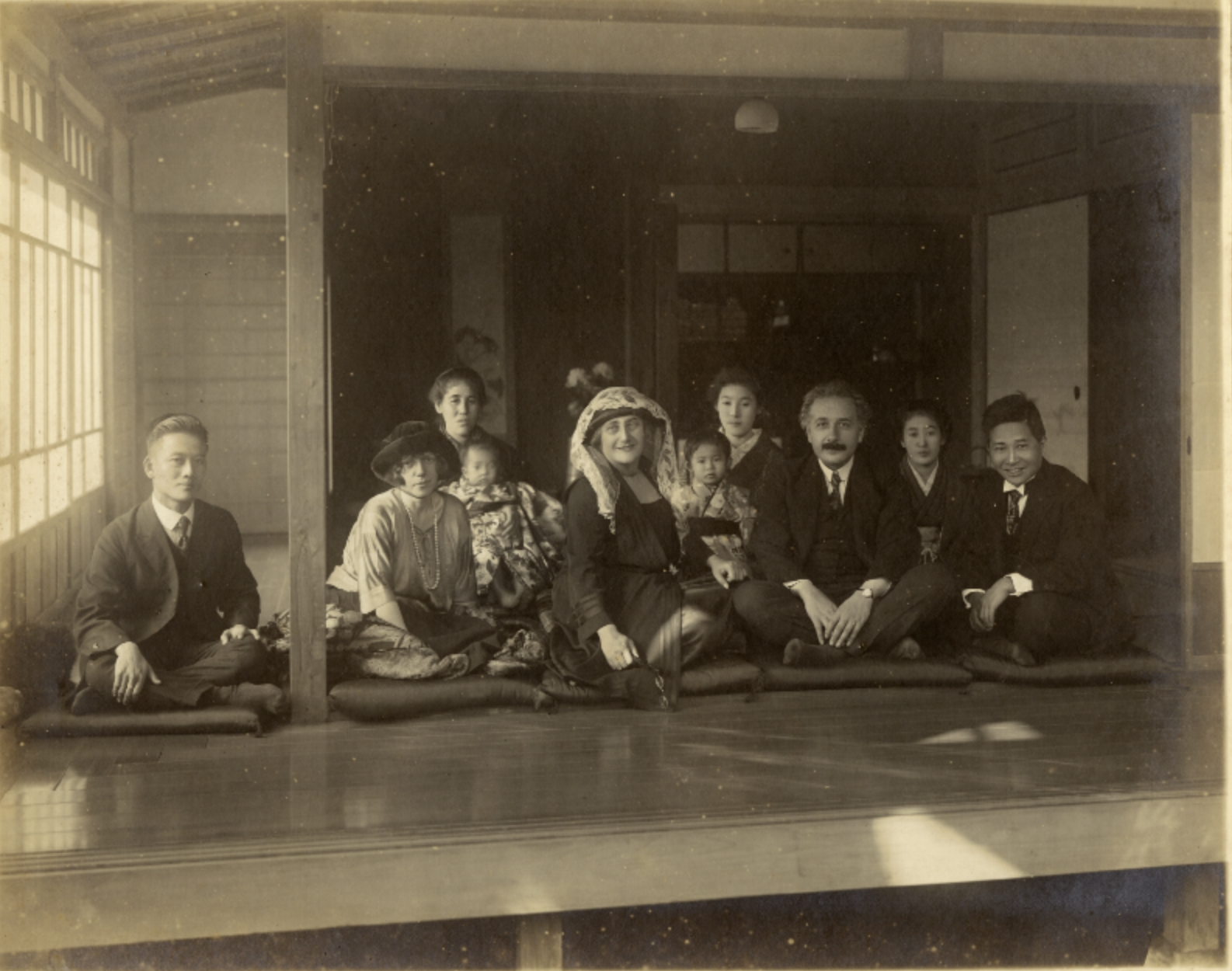
Photograph of Albert Einstein with the Yamamoto Family in 1922

Yamamoto is the granddaughter of Sanehiko Yamamoto, who, while serving as the president of publishing house Kaizosha, first translated Albert Einstein's work into Japanese. He subsequently befriended Einstein who, in return, helped her father become the first Japanese person to become an American citizen after World War II. She earned her Bachelor of Arts degree from the University of California, Davis and her PhD in microbiology from the University of Texas Medical Branch.

== Career ==
=== UC Davis ===
Upon receiving her PhD, Yamamoto accepted a faculty position at the UC Davis School of Veterinary Medicine where she began research with Niels C. Pederson on the feline version of HIV. She had originally been recruited by the UC Davis School of Medicine after completing postdoctoral work on the Feline Leukemia Virus but remained with their veterinary school until 1993. Yamamoto established the Laboratory of Comparative Immunology and Retrovirology in 1985, where they isolated the feline immunodeficiency virus for the first time in medical history in an effort to create a vaccine. For a one-year term between 1988 and 1989, she also worked as a consultant in the Clinical Division of Bio-Rad Laboratories.

=== University of Florida ===
In 1993, Yamamoto moved to the University of Florida where she re-established the Laboratory of Comparative Immunology and Retrovirology and continued researching the vaccine. The immunization, created in 2002 and approved by the U.S. Department of Agriculture, was made from an inactivated form of the FIV virus itself. In recognition of her efforts, Yamamoto was named a Research Foundation Professor of Pathobiology at the University of Florida.

In 2005, Yamamoto conducted a research project in which cats were vaccinated with an experimental strain of the human AIDS virus. The conclusion of the project found that the felines vaccinated with the human strain were similarly protected as those vaccinated by feline strain. In the same year, she received the school's Pfizer Animal Health Award for Research Excellence. Yamamoto later collaborated with AIDS researcher Jay A. Levy to help control the spread of HIV/AIDS in Caribbean and Latin American nations. In a further effort to combat the spread of HIV/AID, Yamamoto donated all of her patient income and parts of her salary to fund her research towards a cure for HIV.

Between 2010 and 2012, Yamamoto served as a consultant to the Idexx Laboratories at Westbrook and served as a member of the Clinical Immunology Society, the International AIDS Society, the American Association of Immunologists, Incorporated, the American Society for Microbiology, the New York Academy of Sciences, the American Association for the Advancement of Science and Phi Zeta Upsilon, In recognition of her academic accomplishments, Yamamoto received a UF Research Foundation professorship at the University of Florida's College of Veterinary Medicine. The University of Florida Research Foundation (UFRF) Professorships are awarded for "a three-year term to tenured faculty campuswide for distinguished research and scholarship that is expected to lead to continuing distinction in their field."

On December 16, 2014, Yamamoto was named a fellow of the National Academy of Inventors for her discovery of the feline HIV vaccine. Yamamoto was named to the Florida Inventors Hall of Fame in 2015 for her discovery of the feline immunodeficiency virus. The following year, she was honored by the University of Florida as their "Inventor of the Year" for her achievements.

== Selected publications ==
- Pathogenesis of experimentally induced feline immunodeficiency virus infection in cats. (1988)
- Feline T-lymphotropic lentivirus assay (1992)
- Dual-subtype FIV vaccine (Fel-O-Vax® FIV) protection against a heterologous subtype B FIV isolate (2005)
