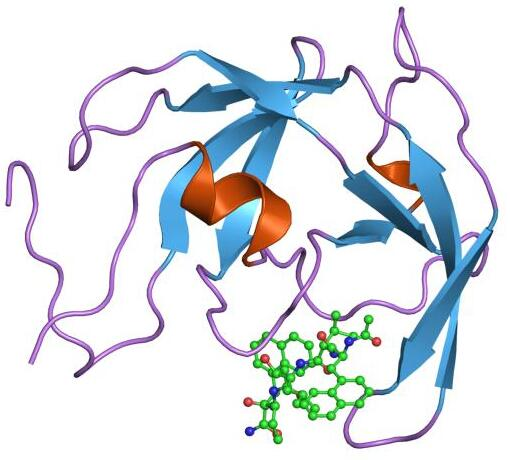

Virus classification
- (unranked): Virus
- Realm: Riboviria
- Kingdom: Pararnavirae
- Phylum: Artverviricota
- Class: Revtraviricetes
- Order: Ortervirales
- Family: Retroviridae
- Genus: Lentivirus
- Species: Lentivirus felimdef

= Feline immunodeficiency virus =

Species of virus

Feline immunodeficiency virus (FIV) is a lentivirus that affects cats worldwide with 2.5% to 4.4% of felines being infected.

FIV was first isolated in 1986, by Niels C. Pedersen and Janet K. Yamamoto at the UC Davis School of Veterinary Medicine in a colony of cats that had a high prevalence of opportunistic infections and degenerative conditions, and was originally called feline T-lymphotropic virus. It has since been identified in domestic cats.

== Effects ==
FIV is known in other feline species, and in fact is endemic in some large wildcats, such as African lions. Three main clades of FIV are recognized as of 2006: FIV-Ple (lion), FIV-Fca (domestic cat), and FIV-Pco (puma). The host boundaries are usually well kept because of the limited types of APOBEC3 enzymes that viral infectivity factor can neutralize.

=== In the United States ===
Consensus in the United States on whether there is a need to euthanize FIV-infected cats has not been established. The American Association of Feline Practitioners, as well as many feral cat organizations, recommends against euthanizing FIV-positive cats, or even spending funds to test for the virus.

== Pathology ==
The virus gains entry to host cells through the interaction of its own envelope glycoproteins with the target cells' surface receptors. First, the SU glycoprotein binds to CD134, a receptor on the host cell. This initial binding changes the shape of the SU protein to one that facilitates interaction between SU and the chemokine receptor CXCR4. This interaction causes the viral and cellular membranes to fuse, allowing the transfer of the viral RNA into the cytoplasm, where it is reverse transcribed and integrated into the cellular genome through nonhomologous recombination. Once integrated into the host cell's genome, the virus can lie dormant in the asymptomatic stage for extended periods of time without being detected by the immune system or can cause lysis of the cell.

CD134 is predominantly found on activated T cells and binds to OX40 ligand, causing T-cell stimulation, proliferation, activation, and apoptosis (3). This leads to a significant drop in cells that have critical roles in the immune system. Low levels of CD4+ and other affected immune-system cells cause the cat to be susceptible to opportunistic diseases once the disease progresses to feline acquired immune deficiency syndrome (FAIDS).

== Transmission ==
The primary mode of transmission is via deep bite wounds, in which the infected cat's saliva enters the other cat's tissues. FIV may also be transmitted from pregnant females to their offspring in utero; however, this vertical transmission is considered to be relatively rare, based on the small number of FIV-infected kittens and adolescents. This differs from feline leukemia virus (FeLV), which may be spread by more-casual, nonaggressive contact, such as mutual grooming and sharing of food bowls.

Risk factors for infection include the male sex, adulthood, and outdoor access. One case study conducted in São Paulo found that 75% of FIV-infected cats were males. Higher rates of infection in males than females occur because males defending their territory bite more frequently.

== Disease stages ==
FIV progresses through similar stages to HIV. The initial stage, or acute phase, is accompanied by mild symptoms such as lethargy, anorexia, fever, and lymphadenopathy (swelling of the lymph nodes). This initial stage is fairly short and is followed by the asymptomatic stage. Here the cat demonstrates no noticeable symptoms for a variable length of time. Some cats stay in this latent stage for only a few months, but for some it can last for years. Factors that influence the length of the asymptomatic stage include the pathogenicity of the infecting virus and FIV subtype (A–E), the age of the cat, and exposure to other pathogens. Finally, the cat progresses into the final stage (known as the feline acquired immune deficiency syndrome (FAIDS) stage), wherein the cat is extremely susceptible to secondary diseases that inevitably are the cause of death.

== Testing ==
Veterinarians will check a cat's history, look for clinical signs, and possibly administer a blood test for FIV antibodies. FIV affects 2–3% of cats in the US and testing is readily available. This testing identifies those cats that carry the FIV antibody but does not detect the actual virus.

"False positives" may occur when the cat carries the antibody (which is harmless) but does not carry the virus. The most frequent occurrence of this is when kittens are tested after ingesting the antibodies from mother's milk (passive immunity), and when testing cats that have been previously vaccinated for FIV (active immunity). For this reason, neither kittens under eight weeks nor cats that have been previously vaccinated are tested. Kittens and young cats that test positive for the FIV antibody via passive immunity test negative later in life due to seroreversion, provided they have never been infected with FIV and have never been immunized with the FIV vaccine.

Cats that have been vaccinated will test positive for the FIV antibody for the rest of their lives owing to seroconversion, even though they are not infected. Therefore, testing of strays or adopted cats is inconclusive, since it is impossible to know whether or not they have been vaccinated in the past. For these reasons, a positive FIV antibody test by itself should never be used as a criterion for euthanasia.

Tests can be performed in a vet's office with results in minutes, allowing for quick consultation. Early detection helps maintain the cat's health and prevents spreading infection to other cats. With proper care, infected cats can live long and healthy lives.

== Treatment options ==
In 2006, the United States Department of Agriculture issued a conditional license for a new treatment aid termed Lymphocyte T-Cell Immunomodulator (LTCI). Lymphocyte T-Cell Immunomodulator is manufactured and distributed exclusively by T-Cyte Therapeutics, Inc.

Lymphocyte T-Cell Immunomodulator is intended as an aid in the treatment of cats infected with feline leukemia virus (FeLV) and/or feline immunodeficiency virus (FIV), and the associated symptoms of anemia (reduced oxygen-carrying ability in the blood), opportunistic infection, lymphocytopenia, granulocytopenia, or thrombocytopenia (low levels of lymphocytes, granulocytes, and platelets respectively, the first two are types of white blood cell). The absence of any observed adverse events in several animal species suggests that the product has a very low toxicity profile.

Lymphocyte T-Cell Immunomodulator is a potent regulator of CD-4 lymphocyte production and function. It has been shown to increase lymphocyte numbers and Interleukin 2 production in animals. It is a single-chain polypeptide and a strongly cationic glycoprotein, and is purified with cation exchange resin. Purification of protein from bovine-derived stromal cell supernatants produces a substantially homogeneous factor, free of extraneous materials. The bovine protein is homologous with other mammalian species and is a homogeneous 50 kDa glycoprotein with an isoelectric point of 6.5. The protein is prepared in a lyophilized (freeze-dried) 1 microgram dose. Reconstitution in sterile diluent produces a solution for subcutaneous injection.

== Vaccine ==
As with HIV, the development of an effective vaccine against FIV is difficult because of the high number of, and differences between, variations of the virus strains. "Single-strain" vaccines, i.e., vaccines that only protect against a single virus variant, have already demonstrated a good efficacy against homologous FIV strains. A dual-subtype vaccine for FIV released in 2002 called Fel-O-Vax made it possible to immunize cats against more FIV strains. It was developed using inactivated isolates of two of the five FIV subtypes (or clades): A Petaluma and D Shizuoka. The vaccine was shown to be moderately protective (82% of cats were protected) against subtype A FIV, but a later study showed it to offer no protection against subtype A. It has shown 100% effectiveness against two different subtype B FIV strains. Vaccination will cause cats to have positive results on FIV tests, making diagnosis more difficult. For these reasons the vaccine is considered "non-core", and the decision to vaccinate should be made after discussion with a veterinarian and consideration of the risks vs. the effectiveness.

== Structure ==
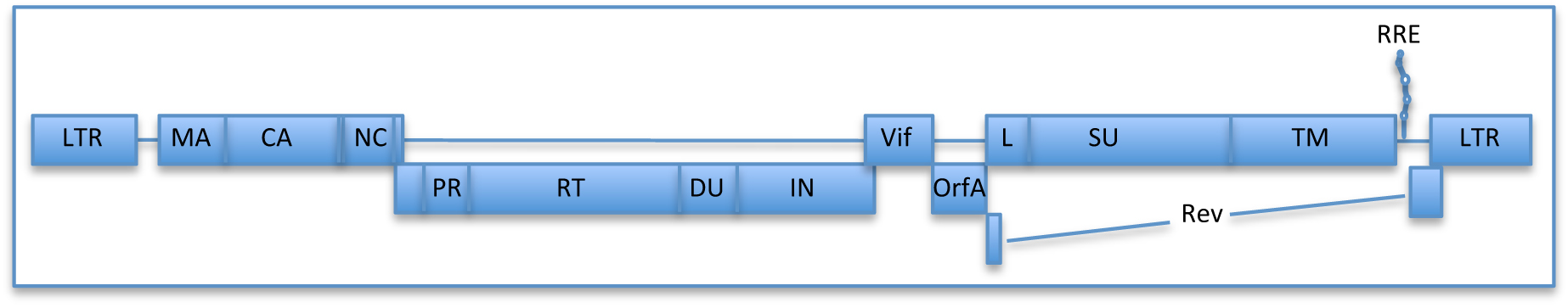
Genome structure of FIV based on available data 2013

FIV displays a similar structure to the primate and ungulate lentiviruses. The virion has a diameter from 80 to 100 nanometers and is pleomorphic. The viral envelope also has surface projections that are small, 8 nm, and evenly cover the surface.

The FIV virus genome is diploid. It consists of two identical single-strands of RNA in each case about 9400 nucleotides existing in plus-strand orientation. It has the typical genomic structure of retroviruses and includes LTR, vif, pol, gag, orfA, env, and rev genes. The Gag polyprotein is cleaved into matrix (MA), capsid (CA) and nucleocapsid (NC) proteins. Cleavage between CA and NC releases a nine amino acid peptide, while cleavage at the C-terminus of NC releases a 2kDa fragment (p2). The Pol polyprotein is translated by ribosomal frame-shifting, a feature shared with HIV. Cleavage of Pol by the viral protease releases the protease itself (PR), reverse transcriptase (RT), deoxyuridine triphosphatase (dUTPase or DU) and integrase (IN). The Env polyprotein consists of a leader peptide (L), surface (SU) and transmembrane (TM) glycoproteins. In common with other lentiviruses, the FIV genome encodes additional short open reading frames (ORFs) encoding the Vif and Rev proteins. An additional short ORF termed orfA (also known as orf2) precedes the env gene. The function of OrfA in viral replication is unclear, however the orfA-encoded product may display many of the attributes of HIV-1 accessory gene products such as Vpr, Vpu or Nef.

Among these subtypes, genetic sequences are mostly conserved; however, wide-ranging genetic differences exist between species specific FIV subtypes. Of FIV's genome, Pol is the most conserved across FIV strains along with gag. On the contrary, env, vif, orfa, and rev are the least conserved and exhibit the most genetic diversity among FIV strains.

The capsid protein derived from the polyprotein Gag is assembled into a viral core (the protein shell of a virus) and the matrix protein also derived from Gag forms a shell immediately inside of the lipid bilayer. The Env polyprotein encodes the surface glycoprotein (SU) and transmembrane glycoprotein (TM). Both SU and TM glycoproteins are heavily glycosylated, a characteristic that scientists believe may mask the B-cell epitopes of the Env glycoprotein giving the virus resistance to the virus neutralizing antibodies.

== Lentiviral vector ==
Like HIV-1, FIV has been engineered into a viral vector for gene therapy. Like other lentiviral vectors, FIV vectors integrate into the chromosome of the host cell, where it can generate long-term stable transgene expression. Furthermore, the vectors can be used on dividing and non-dividing cells. FIV vectors could potentially be used to treat neurological disorders like Parkinson's disease, and have already been used for transfer RNAi, which may find use as gene therapy for cancer.

== Origin and spread ==
The exact origins and emergence of FIV in felids is unknown; however, studies of viral phylogenetics, felidae speciation, and FIV occurrence alludes to origins in Africa. Analysis of viral phylogenetics shows phylogenetic trees with a starburst phylogenetic pattern which is usually demonstrated by viruses that are a recent emergence with rapid evolution. However, differences in topology, branch lengths, high genetic divergence suggest a more ancient origin in felidae species. Fossil records indicate extant felids arose from a common ancestor in Asia approximately 10.8 million years ago, and since then thirty eight species from eight distinct evolutionary lineages have spread and successfully inhabited every continent but Antarctica. Despite felidae origins in Asia, FIV is absent from felidae species in Asia except for the Mongolian Pallas cat; however, FIV is highly endemic in Africa with four out of five felids having seropositive PCR results. Due to the widespread occurrence and interspecies divergence of FIV strains in Africa, it's suggested that FIV arose in Africa before disseminating worldwide. The high genetic diversity and divergence between FIV strains in African felidae species and the presence of hyena FIV-Ccr, is consistent with a long residence time giving rise to increased opportunities for inter-species transmission among species. Additionally, lentiviruses are also highly endemic in Africa infecting not only felids, but also primates, and ungulate species. This suggests to the origins of all lentiviruses and supports FIV origins in Africa; however, further research is needed.

The spread of FIV from Africa might have occurred during two points of felidae migration. The earliest migration across the Bering Strait into North America occurred approximately 4.5 million years ago during a period of low sea levels. Early felids in North America descended into seven species of the ocelot lineage, two species of the puma lineage, and four of the modern species of lynx. The most recent migration of Asian lions and jaguars across Eurasia into North and South America occurred during the Pliocene/early Pleistocene. These migrations events increased opportunities for FIV transmission among felids and established infections globally for felidae species.

== Evolution ==
=== Wild felids ===
Comparisons of FIV subtypes illustrate rapid evolution and highlights divergence in FIV strains. FIV-Pco, which is specific to American pumas, has two highly divergent subtypes. Several studies have demonstrated subtypes A and B to have long branch lengths and low geographic similarities which indicates the possibility of two separate FIV introductions into populations coupled with a long residence time. In the late Pleistocene, pumas fell victim to the ice age, went extinct in North America except for a small inbred population in Florida, and did not re-emerge until 10–12,000 years ago. Phylogenetic analysis of FIV-Pco strains in Central, South, and North America show Central and South American strains are more closely related to North American strains than to each other. This suggests FIV-Pco was already present in South American pumas which repopulated North America. In African lions, FIV-Ple has diverged in to six subtypes A-F which exhibit distinct geographical endemicity to some degree. Approximately 2 million years ago, African lions arose and dispersed throughout Africa, Asia, and North, Central, and South America. Modern lions currently reside only on the African continent except for a small population in India. There is no documented disease association of FIV, but seroprevalence in free- ranging lion populations are estimated to be roughly 90%. Phylogenetic analysis of FIV-Ple subtypes A, B, and C show high intra and interindividual genetic diversity and sequence divergence comparable to genetic differences to strains from other Felidae species. These findings indicate these strains evolved in geographically distant lion populations; however, recent occurrences of these strains within populations in Serengeti National Park suggests recent convergence in the same population.

==== Prevalence in wild felids ====
Feline Immunodeficiency Virus (FIV) is widely distributed across Africa, Asia, North America, South America, and Central America, but it has not been found in Oceania. The virus affects a majority of species, including lions, hyenas, pumas, leopards, jaguars, bobcats, and tigers. Currently, FIV has been documented in over nineteen wild felid species due to its transmission through blood and saliva, which often occurs during aggressive interactions.

==== Transmission and Susceptibility ====
FIV is more rampant in non-Panthera lineages, such as lynxes, bobcats, cheetahs, and pumas, compared to Panthera species like lions, leopards, jaguars, and tigers. Studies indicate that lynxes are more susceptible to FIV due to higher levels of the A3Z3 protein, part of the APOBEC3 family, which limits virus replication in felids. However, A3Z3 mutations do not significantly alter viral genes, suggesting that other genetic or environmental factors may influence the virus's effects.

Members of the Panthera genus exhibit higher levels of protective protein expression, potentially mitigating the severity of infection. Additionally, carnivorous diets contribute to FIV transmission, as larger wild felids may contract the virus by consuming smaller, infected prey species, increasing the rates of infection.

==== Rise in morbidity ====
Lions infected with FIV show various outcomes. Many live without advanced symptoms, while severe cases are rarely observed in the wild due to rapid mortality or predation. Genetic diversity among FIV strains may influence pathogenicity, similar to how HIV affects humans. Infected lions exhibit reduced T-cell counts, inflammation, and systemic complications, but the disease's progression often occurs beyond reproductive age, limiting its population-level effects.

FIV infections compromise immune function, leading to increased susceptibility to secondary infections and diseases. Behavioral changes have been observed in infected felids, such as reduced hunting ability and impaired social interactions, may hinder survival. These behavioral and physiological effects highlight the multifaceted challenges posed by FIV, influenced by genetics, ecological dynamics, and interspecies interactions.

==== Conservation and Species Survival Implications ====
FIV presents a significant but nuanced challenge for wild felids. While it has been connected to immunological complications, current evidence and studies have not conclusively proven that FIV has a significant increase of mortality rates across populations. However, its effects on individual fitness and survival, driven by genetic susceptibility, ecological interactions, and strain diversity, are undeniable.

A study conducted in Colorado on native puma populations found no definitive correlation between human hunting and the spread of FIV. Despite this, understanding the complex dynamics of FIV is crucial for effective conservation strategies. The interplay of genetic diversity, environmental factors, and interspecies interactions shapes health outcomes and informs efforts to ensure the survival of affected species

=== Domestic felids ===
In domestic cats, FIV-Fca is pathogenic and can lead to feline AIDS symptoms and subsequent death. Phylogenetic analysis shows FIV to be a monophyletic branch that diverges into three subtypes A, B, and C. Domestic cats arose more recently than other felidae species approximately around 10,000 years ago from a subspecies of wildcat Felis silvestris which inhabited East Asia. Genetic analysis indicates lower genetic diversity of FIV in the domestic cat compared to wild Felidae species, higher evolutionary rates, and higher mortality rates when compared to FIV-Ple and FIV-Pco. This suggests the emergence of FIV in domestic cats was recent since newly emerged viruses tend to have higher evolutionary rates with little to no co-adaption between virus and new host species occurring. Additionally, seroprevalence studies show companion cats to have a 4–12% occurrence while feral cats have an 8–19% prevalence which is much lower compared to wild felidae species which supports the hypothesis of FIV's recent emergence in this species.

== Comparison with feline leukemia virus ==
FIV and feline leukemia virus (FeLV) are sometimes mistaken for one another though the viruses differ in many ways. Although they are both in the same retroviral subfamily (orthoretrovirinae), they are classified in different genera (FeLV is a gamma-retrovirus and FIV is a lentivirus like HIV-1). Their shapes are quite different: FeLV is more circular while FIV is elongated. The two viruses are also quite different genetically, and their protein coats differ in size and composition. Although many of the diseases caused by FeLV and FIV are similar, the specific ways in which they are caused actually differ. Also, while the feline leukemia virus may cause symptomatic illness in an infected cat, an FIV-infected cat can remain completely asymptomatic its entire lifetime.

== See also ==
- Feline vaccination
- Feline coronavirus (FCoV)
