= Irini Sereti =

Greek scientist and physician

- Ειρήνη Σερέτη
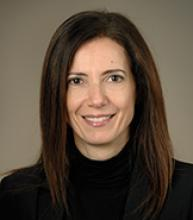
- Education: University of Athens (MD)
- Scientific career
- Fields: HIV pathogensis
- Workplaces: National Institute of Allergy and Infectious Diseases

Irini Sereti is a Greek scientist and physician. She is chief of the HIV pathogenesis section at the National Institute of Allergy and Infectious Diseases. Sereti researches immune reconstitution inflammatory syndrome, idiopathic CD4 lymphocytopenia, and immune-based therapeutic strategies of HIV investigation.

== Education ==
Sereti received a M.D. from the University of Athens in 1991. She did research for one year in Gregory Spear's laboratory at Rush University Medical Center. Sereti completed an internship, residency, and chief residency in medicine at Northwestern University.

== Career and research ==
In 1997, Sereti came to the National Institute of Allergy and Infectious Diseases as a clinical associate in the laboratory of immunoregulation. She became a staff clinician in 2003. Sereti was appointed to a clinical tenure-track position in 2009 and received tenure in 2015. She is chief of the HIV pathogenesis section.

Sereti researches the pathogenesis of HIV infection emphasizing mechanisms of immune reconstitution inflammatory syndrome in advanced HIV infection and of serious non-AIDS events in treated HIV-infected patients. She also investigates the pathogenesis of idiopathic CD4 lymphocytopenia (ICL) and immune-based therapeutic strategies of HIV infection and ICL.
