= Idiopathic CD4+ lymphocytopenia =

- Other names: Immunodeficiency 13
- Idiopathic CD4+ lymphocytopenia is inherited via autosomal dominant manner
- Specialty: Immunology

Idiopathic CD4+ lymphocytopenia (ICL) is a rare medical syndrome in which the body has too few CD4^{+} T lymphocytes, which are a kind of white blood cell. ICL is sometimes characterized as "HIV-negative AIDS", though, in fact, its clinical presentation differs somewhat from that seen with HIV/AIDS. People with ICL have a weakened immune system and are susceptible to opportunistic infections, although the rate of infections is lower than in people with AIDS.

== Cause ==
The cause of ICL, like all idiopathic conditions, is unknown. It does not appear to be caused by a transmissible agent, such as a virus. It is widely believed that there is more than one cause.

== Pathophysiology ==
The loss of CD4+ T cells appears to be through apoptosis. The accelerated deaths of the T cells is likely driven by crosslinking T cell receptors.

== Diagnosis ==
The mandatory criteria for diagnosis of idiopathic CD4+ lymphocytopenia include:

- Low numbers of CD4+ cells, on two or more measurements over at least six weeks:
  - CD4 cell count less than 300 cells per microliter, or
  - Less than 20% of T lymphocytes are CD4+
- Laboratory evidence of lack of HIV infection
- Absence of any alternative explanation for the CD4 lymphocytopenia

A one-time finding of low CD4+ cells is usually associated with a recent infection and resolves on its own. Alternative explanations for the low CD4 counts include conditions such as blood cancers (aleukemia), treatment with chemotherapy, immunosuppressive medications, or other medications that suppress or kill T cells, infections, and problems with blood production.

All criteria must be fulfilled for a diagnosis of ICL. In addition, if these findings are present but combined with other significant findings, such as anemia or thrombocytopenia, then other diagnoses must be considered.

== Treatment ==
Fludarabine-based hematopoietic stem cell transplantation (HSCT) has shown to be a feasible treatment for ICL.

== Prognosis ==
In contrast to the CD4^{+} cell depletion caused by HIV, in general, patients with idiopathic CD4 lymphocytopenia have a good prognosis. The decline in CD4^{+} T-cells in patients with ICL is generally slower than that seen in HIV-infected patients. The major risk to people with ICL is unexpected infections, including cryptococcus, atypical mycobacterial and Pneumocystis jiroveci pneumonia (PCP). The condition may also resolve on its own.

ICL sometimes precedes and may be the first signal of several blood cancers. ICL patients have developed primary effusion lymphoma, primary leptomeningeal lymphoma, diffuse large cell lymphoma, MALT lymphoma, and Burkitt's lymphoma, among others.

ICL may indirectly trigger autoimmune diseases. It has been associated with several cases of autoimmune disease Sjögren syndrome.

Because all of the reported autoimmune diseases and lymphomas involve B cells, one hypothesis proposes that ICL's narrow T cell repertoire predisposes the immune system to B cell disorders.

== Epidemiology ==
ICL is a very rare disease. In 1993, a total of 47 confirmed cases were reported in a survey sponsored by the Centers for Disease Control.
