= Lymphocyte T-cell immunomodulator =

Lymphocyte T-cell immunomodulator (LTCI) is an immune regulating polypeptide, which is a potent regulator of CD-4 lymphocyte production and function. It increases lymphocyte numbers and interleukin-2 (IL-2) production in animals. It is extracted from bovine thymus.

== History ==
Prior to 1960, the thymus gland, which lies in the cervical thoracic area, was thought to be of little importance. In adult animals, the thymus is almost non-existent because it atrophies as animals reach adulthood. It was observed, however, that when pre-adolescent animals are thymectomized, they experience a variety of maladies including increased incidence of infection, failure to grow, neuromuscular disorders, cancer, etc., collectively known as “wasting disease”. The greater susceptibility to infection was shown to be directly attributable to a dramatic decrease in peripheral blood lymphocytes in thymectomized animals.

By 1964 it had been demonstrated that regulatory factors extracted from the thymus gland could prevent many of the manifestations of wasting disease. This suggested that the thymus produces substances important in the development of immunity. It was not until 1971 that it was discovered that thymus-derived lymphocytes (T-cells) were important regulators of bone-marrow-derived antibody-producing lymphocytes (B-cells). After the discovery that the thymus was producing profound regulatory factors, several groups of scientists began trying to extract and purify this factor from thymus glands in much the same manner that insulin was prepared from the pancreas for therapeutic use in diabetes. The difficulty was that the thymus is a very small gland and produces very small quantities of the factor. Thus, purification techniques did not allow appropriate pure fractions to be produced in sufficient quantities.

Thymus is a preferred tissue for viral replication of feline immunodeficiency virus, which results in lesions and dysfunction.

In 1983 scientists succeeded in cloning epithelial cell lines from the thymus of various species and began to biochemically and biologically characterize these thymus derived regulatory factors. A protein with a molecular weight of about 50,000 daltons was subsequently described and shown to augment the immune responses of both immature and mature T-cells. This protein came to be known as lymphocyte T-cell immunomodulator.

== Production and identity ==
Lymphocyte T-cell immunomodulator, or T-4 immune stimulating factor (TISF), is a single chain polypeptide that is a strongly cationic glycoprotein and is purified with cation exchange resin. Purification of protein from bovine-derived type II thymic epithelial cell supernatants produces a substantially homogeneous factor, free of extraneous materials. The bovine protein is homologous with other mammalian species and is a homogeneous 50 kDa glycoprotein with an isoelectric point of 6.5. The protein is prepared in a lyophilized 1 microgram dose. Reconstitution in sterile diluent produces a solution for subcutaneous injection.

It is unknown what LTCI is in terms of its sequence. It is not interleukins 1-7 nor G-CSF. The manufacturer verifies its potency by checking for stimulation of IL-2 production.

== Mechanism of action ==
Generally, a proportion of immature thymus-derived lymphocytes differentiate into mature CD4+ T-cells which produce a certain amount of cytokines, such as interleukin-2 (IL-2) and gamma interferon. To attack tumor cells and viruses, CD-4 cells coordinate the overall immune response and help activate CD8 T-lymphocytes. Often called “effector” or “cytotoxic” T-cells, CD-8+ T-lymphocytes they respond to intracellular pathogens and cancer cells. Under viral attack CD-4+ T-cells fail to mature, fail to produce IL-2 and gamma interferon, and consequently fail to coordinate CD-8 responses to viruses. LTCI increases the production of CD-4+ T-cells and can subsequently overcome this immunosuppression.

== Veterinary uses ==
=== Viral diseases in cats ===
LTCI, manufactured by T-Cyte Therapeutics, has been conditionally approved by the United States Department of Agriculture (USDA) as an aid in the treatment of cats infected with feline leukemia virus (FeLV) and/or feline immunodeficiency virus (FIV), and the associated symptoms of lymphopenia, opportunistic infection, anemia, granulocytopenia, or thrombocytopenia.

Peer-reviewed literature disputes the benefit claims from the manufacturer. T-Cyte data as of 2011 does not strongly support the medication's ability to significantly increase the length or quality of life of treated cats.

=== Canine osteoarthritis ===
LTCI increases the immune response to foreign antigens and dampens the immune-mediated response to self-antigens by increasing the number of precursors of a regulatory T-Cell population. In a double-blind placebo-controlled study, 11 of the 12 LTCI-treated canines had a 40 percent increase in function while the placebo group had a 17 percent decrease in function. Following the study, LTCI was approved by the USDA to treat osteoarthritis in dogs in 2016.
