= Zoological Museum of the University of Athens =

Museum in Athens, Greece

- Ζωολογικό Μουσείο Πανεπιστημίου Αθηνών
- Established: 1858
- Location: Department of Biology, University of Athens
- Coordinates: 37.97°N 23.79°E
- Collection size: 500 mammals 2,500 birds 1,000 reptiles
- Visitors: over 10,000 school children and adults yearly
- Founder: Hercules A. Mitsopoulos
- Website: zoolmuseum.biol.uoa.gr

The Zoological Museum of the University of Athens is a museum in Athens, Greece. The Zoological Museum was founded by Greek Zoologist Hercules Anastasios Mitsopoulos. It is similar to a natural history museum. The modern facility is 2200 square meters or 23680 square feet. The museum's collection existed before the founding of the university. It belonged to the Physiographic Society. The inception of the museum of the Physiographic Society began around the time of the founding of the new state. The official Physiographic Museum was founded in 1858 to house the massive collection of stuffed animals, minerals, plants, and fossils belonging to the Physiographic Society. It was part of the University of Athens. The first building was at the Akadimias Street wing of the main University building on the first floor. The Zoological Museum of the University of Athens is over 160 years old. Initially, it was the largest museum of its kind in Greece. The Zoological Museum was part of that institution the first lifelong President was Hercules Anastasios Mitsopoulos. The institution served as research center for students. The university also formed a Laboratory of Zoology which formed the basis of zoological education at the University of Athens. By the 1930s, Zoological Museum was under the leadership of Professor G. Pantazis. He published the periodical, Acta lnstituti et Musei Universitatis Atheniensis. After the Second World War, the museum was dilapidated and it was in need of modernization. It was forced to close during the 1960s. Everything was moved to storage. After the Department of Biology was rebuilt in 1991 it was reopened in the new modern building. It was no longer part of the Physiographic Museum. The institution broke up the different parts. The university also created a Paleontology and Geology Museum. Each department of the university features its own museum. Greek botanist Theodoros G. Orphanides attended the University of the French National Museum of Natural History. The institution is a massive museum with many different connected departments such as physics, botany, mineralogy, paleontology, and geology. Classes take place within the museum. The museum is also a research facility. The University of Athens is following a similar example. The valuable zoological collection was open to school children from elementary school to high school. It was also open to the general public. The museum enhanced its collections. The Papalios family donated valuable collections of mammals and birds. The museum is also a vital research facility for students of the University of Athens. The institution promotes conservation and biodiversity.

== Bibliography ==
- Stefanidis, Micheal K. (1952). Εθνικόν και Καποδιστριακόν Πανεπιστήμιον Αθηνών Εκατονταετηρίς 1837-1937 Ιστορία της Φυσικομαθηματικής Σχολής [National and Kapodistrian University of Athens Centenary 1837-1937 History of the Faculty of Physics and Mathematics] (PDF). Athens, Greece: National and Kapodistrian University of Athens.
- Savaidou, Irini Mergoupi (2010). 'Δημόσιος Λόγος περί Επιστήμης στην Ελλάδα, 1870–1900: Εκλαϊκευτικά Εγχειρήματα στο Πανεπιστήμιο Αθηνών, στους Πολιτιστικούς Συλλόγους και στα Περιοδικά [Public Discourse about Science in Greece, 1870-1900: Population Projects at the University of Athens, in Cultural Associations and Magazines] (PDF). Athens, GR: Department of History and Philosophy of Science of the University of Athens.
