= Nikolaos Papadopoulos (academic) =

Greek medical doctor and academic

- Born: April 1965 (age 61); Athens, Greece
- Occupations: Medical doctor and academic

Academic background
- Education: MD Medicine
- Alma mater: University of Athens

Academic work
- Institutions: University of Athens; University of Manchester; Observational and Pragmatic Research Institute

Nikolaos (Nikos) Papadopoulos (born 1965) is a Greek medical doctor and academic focusing on allergy and immunology. He is a Professor of Allergy and Paediatric Allergy at the University of Athens (NKUA), Greece, where he also leads the Allergy Department of the 2nd Paediatric Clinic. Additionally, he holds the honorary chair on Infection, Immunity, and Respiratory Medicine at the University of Manchester, UK, serves as Professor of Allergy, Immunity and Infection at the Observational and Pragmatic Research Institute (OPRI), Singapore, and is the editor-in-chief of Frontiers in Allergy.

== Education ==
Papadopoulos graduated from Varvakeio Model School in 1982 and entered the medical school of the University of Athens (NKUA) the same year. He completed his medical studies in Guadalajara, Mexico, in 1988, followed by a PhD at NKUA. In 1997, he moved to Southampton, UK, where he worked with Sebastian L. Johnston and Stephen Holgate, focusing his research on the interactions between infections, asthma, and allergy. Upon returning to Greece, he completed his medical training and later started teaching at NKUA.

== Career and research ==
Papadopoulos has described the mechanisms leading from the common cold to acute asthma, beginning with infection of the bronchial epithelium, followed by local inflammation and a defective antiviral response, and has suggested that repeated infections contribute to persistent allergic inflammation. He has published over 500 scientific papers, and his research has received international awards, including the 2003 Klosterfrau-Group Award for Research of Airway Diseases in Childhood, the European Respiratory Society's Award for Pediatric Respiratory Research in Europe in 2004, the 2010 Phadia Allergy Research Forum (PhARF) Award from the European Academy of Allergy and Clinical Immunology (EAACI), and the Clemens von Pirquet EAACI Medal in 2019.

Over the years, Papadopoulos has led several European research consortia, including PreDicta, CURE, and SynAir-G. He has also been engaged with professional organizations, serving as President of the European Academy of Allergy and Clinical Immunology (EAACI) from 2013 to 2015. His leadership extended to the Respiratory Effectiveness Group (REG), where he acted as President from 2018 to 2020. He has been a member of the Executive Committee of the Global Allergy and Asthma European Network (GA^{2}LEN) since 2004 and a Board Member of the World Allergy Organization (WAO) since 2023.

== Awards and honors ==
- 2003 – Award for Research of Airway Diseases in Childhood, Klosterfrau-Group
- 2004 – Award for Pediatric Respiratory Research in Europe, European Respiratory Society
- 2010 – Phadia Allergy Research Forum (PhARF) Award, European Academy of Allergy and Clinical Immunology
- 2019 – Clemens von Piquet EAACI Medal, European Academy of Allergy and Clinical Immunology

== Selected articles ==
- Papadopoulos, Nikolaos G.; Bates, Philip J.; Bardin, Philip G.; Papi, Alberto; Leir, Shih H.; Fraenkel, David J.; et al. (2000-06-01). "Rhinoviruses Infect the Lower Airways". The Journal of Infectious Diseases. 181 (6): 1875–1884. doi:10.1086/315513. ISSN 0022-1899. PMID 10837165.
- Bacharier, L. B.; Boner, A.; Carlsen, K.-H.; Eigenmann, P. A.; Frischer, T.; Götz, M.; et al. (January 2008). "Diagnosis and treatment of asthma in childhood: a PRACTALL consensus report". Allergy. 63 (1): 5–34. doi:10.1111/j.1398-9995.2007.01586.x. ISSN 0105-4538. PMID 18053013.
- Papadopoulos, N. G.; Arakawa, H.; Carlsen, K.-H.; Custovic, A.; Gern, J.; Lemanske, R.; et al. (August 2012). "International consensus on (ICON) pediatric asthma". Allergy. 67 (8): 976–997. doi:10.1111/j.1398-9995.2012.02865.x. ISSN 0105-4538. PMC 4442800. PMID 22702533.
- Tanno, Luciana Kase; Calderon, Moises A; Goldberg, Bruce J; Akdis, Cezmi A; Papadopoulos, Nikolaos G; Demoly, Pascal (January 2014). "Categorization of allergic disorders in the new World Health Organization International Classification of Diseases". Clinical and Translational Allergy. 4 (1): 42. doi:10.1186/2045-7022-4-42. ISSN 2045-7022. PMC 4405839. PMID 25905010.
- Megremis, Spyridon; Constantinides, Bede; Xepapadaki, Paraskevi; Yap, Chuan Fu; Sotiropoulos, Alexandros G.; Bachert, Claus; et al. (2023-05-23). "Respiratory eukaryotic virome expansion and bacteriophage deficiency characterize childhood asthma". Scientific Reports. 13 (1): 8319. Bibcode:2023NatSR..13.8319M. doi:10.1038/s41598-023-34730-7. ISSN 2045-2322. PMC 10205716. PMID 37221274.
- Papadopoulos, Nikolaos G.; Custovic, Adnan; Deschildre, Antoine; Gern, James E.; Nieto Garcia, Antonio; Miligkos, Michael; et al. (April 2024). "Recommendations for asthma monitoring in children: A PeARL document endorsed by APAPARI, EAACI, INTERASMA, REG, and WAO". Pediatric Allergy and Immunology. 35 (4) e14129. doi:10.1111/pai.14129. hdl:2164/24123. ISSN 0905-6157. PMID 38664926.
