= Konstantinos Konstantinidis =

Konstantinos Konstantinidis (1856–1930) was an ethnic Greek merchant and one of the first to advocate for an Independent Republic of Pontus. He was born in Trapezunt, Pontus.
