= Iraklis Mitsopoulos =

Naturalist and University Professor

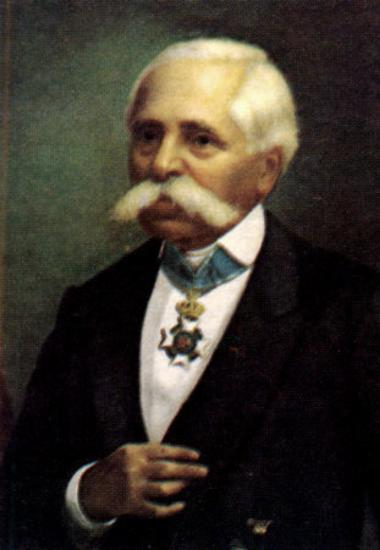
- Born: 1816; Patras, Ottoman Empire (modern Greece)
- Died: 1892 (aged 75–76); Athens, Greece
- Education: Ludwig-Maximilians-Universität München; Friedrich Wilhelm University of Berlin
- Known for: Zoological Department
- Children: Christos Mitsopoulos
- Scientific career
- Fields: Natural science Zoology; Paleontology; Biology
- Workplaces: University of Athens; Rizarios School; Arsakei School for Girls
- Doctoral advisors: Friedrich Schelling
- Doctoral students: Konstantinos Mitsopoulos

Iraklis Mitsopoulos (Greek: Ηρακλής Μητσόπουλος; 1816–1892) was an author, biologist, archaeologist, physicist, zoologist, paleontologist, mineralogist, geologist, and professor. He is considered the father of modern natural sciences in Greece. He taught classes for over forty-seven years of his life. His nephew world renowned Greek geologist Konstantinos M. Mitsopoulos became the first student to receive a doctorate degree in the natural sciences at the University of Athens. His son Maximos Mitsopoulos also became a geologist. Hercules co-founded the Museum of Physical Geography in Athens, Greece, and directed its Zoological Department. He was the founder and lifelong President of the Zoological Department at the Museum of Paleontology, Geology, Zoology, and Botany (Παλαιοντολογικό, Γεωλογικό, Ζωολογικό και Βοτανικό Μουσείο). The museum is part of the University of Athens. He built the framework of modern Greek natural scientific education.

He was born in Patras. He was given a scholarship by Ioannis Kapodistrias to study in Germany. He attended the Ludwig-Maximilians-Universität München during the 1830s. Afterward, he studied at the Friedrich Wilhelm University of Berlin from 1838 to 1844. Hercules returned to Greece and taught physics, logic, psychology, physical geography, zoology, paleontology, mineralogy, and geology for over forty-seven years. Hercules served as Dean of the School of Philosophy which was part of the University of Athens four times. He was also the president of the University of Athens during the academic year 1864–1865. He participated in the paleontological excavations at Pikermi, and in 1866, along with Greek chemist Anastasios Christomanos, researched the volcanic eruption of the Santorini caldera. Mitsopoulos wrote articles on the natural sciences. He died in 1892 in Athens, Greece.

== Biography ==
Iraklis Mitsopoulos was born in Patras in 1816. His father's name was Anastasios, descended from the Rizou family of Epirus. Iraklis received his early education on the island of Aegina. With a scholarship awarded by Ioannis Kapodistrias, he started attending the Ludwig-Maximilians-Universität München from 1834 to 1837. Hercules graduated with a philosophy degree, which at the time encompassed the natural sciences. Chemistry, biology, physics, mathematics, zoology, botany, geology, and mineralogy were part of the field of study. Friedrich Wilhelm Joseph Schelling was one of his teachers. Iraklis continued his education at the University of Berlin from 1838 to 1844, when he returned to Greece.

Mitsopoulos became the first professor of natural history in Greece. He initially taught physical geography. As the natural sciences were not separated from the philosophical school until the early 1900s, he joined the philosophical school at the University of Athens. He taught zoology, paleontology, mineralogy, and geology for over forty-seven years.

By 1848, Mitsopoulos also taught physics, logic, and psychology at the Rizarios School and the Arsakeio School for Girls. He was a member and president of the Society of the Friends of Education. From the years 1851–1855, he became a member of the Scientific Association of Archaeological Society. In 1853, he played an active role in the paleontological excavations at Pikermi in Athens, Greece.

Mitsopoulos served as Dean of the School of Philosophy four times. He was also the president of the University of Athens during the academic year 1864–1865. Anastasios Christomanos and Mitsopoulos played a pivotal scientific role at the volcanic eruption of the Santorini caldera in 1866. Christomanos brought the spectroscope to Greece and used the instrument to study the volcano. In 1867, Mitsopoulos wrote a book about the earthquakes of Aigio and Kefalonia. Mitsopoulos wrote different articles on the physical sciences. He was co-founder of the Museum of Physical Geography, and director of its Zoological Department. He was the founder and lifelong President of the Zoological Museum, located in the north wing of the university's main building. Several paleontological species were named after him.

== Literary works ==
Books and Articles authored by Hercules Anastasios Mitsopoulos
Date	Title	Title in English
1864	Πρυτανικός Λόγος	Presidential Inaugural Address
1867	Περί των Σεισμών Αιγίου και Κεφαλληνίας	The Earthquakes of Aigio and Kefalonia
1872	Περί του Ποιού των Ουρανίων Σωμάτων και Ιδίως του Ηλίου (Αθήναιον, Έτος Α΄, τεύχος β΄ 93–113)	The Planets and the Sun (Athenian, Vol. 1, No. 2 pp. 93–113)
1888	Εμπειρική Ψυχολογία	Empirical Psychology
1892	Περί Αρχεζώων ή Ανιστοζώων (Protozoa) Περιοδικών Προμηθέως	Presentation of Zoology (published in Prometheus Magazine)
1892	Περί Αρχεζώων ή Ανιστοζώων (Protozoa) Περιοδικών Προμηθέως	Archezoa or Protozoa (published in Prometheus Magazine)

== Bibliography ==
- Ricks, David; Beaton, Roderick (2016). The Making of Modern Greece Nationalism, Romanticism, and the Uses of the Past (1797–1896). Burlington, VT: Ashgate Publishing Limited. ISBN 9781317024729.
- Freninger, Franz Xaver (1872). Das Matrikelbuch der Universitaet Ingolstadt-Landshut-München [The Matriculation book of the University of Ingolstadt-Landshut-Munich]. Munich: A. Eichleiter.
- Stefanidis, Michail K. (1952). Εθνικόν και Καποδιστριακόν Πανεπιστήμιον Αθηνών Εκατονταετηρίς 1837-1937. Τόμος Ε′, Ιστορία της Φυσικομαθηματικής Σχολής [National and Kapodistrian University of Athens Centenary 1837-1937. Volume V, History of the Faculty of Physics and Mathematics] (PDF). Athens: National and Kapodistrian University of Athens.
- Savaidou, Irini Mergoupi (2010). 'Δημόσιος Λόγος περί Επιστήμης στην Ελλάδα, 1870–1900: Εκλαϊκευτικά Εγχειρήματα στο Πανεπιστήμιο Αθηνών, στους Πολιτιστικούς Συλλόγους και στα Περιοδικά [Public Discourse about Science in Greece, 1870-1900: Population Projects at the University of Athens, in Cultural Associations and Magazines] (PDF). Athens, GR: Department of History and Philosophy of Science of the University of Athens.
- Tampakis, Costas (2021). Η Χημεία στην Ελλάδα και το γερμανικό παράδειγμα (1860–1904) [Chemistry in Greece and the German Example (1860–1904)]. Athens: Compendium Summary of the Greek-German crossroads.
- Tampakis, Kostas (2014). "Onwards Facing Backwards: the Rhetoric of Science in Nineteenth-Century Greece". The British Journal for the History of Science. 47 (2): 217–237. doi:10.1017/S000708741300040X. JSTOR 43820483. PMID 24941732. S2CID 38249251.
