= Philopoemen Constantinidi =

Greek painter and engraver (1909–1992)

Philopoemen Constantinidi (born Konstantinidis; Greek: Φιλοποίμην Κωνσταντινίδης; 1909–1992) was a Greek painter and engraver.

== Biography ==
Born in 1909 in Thessaloniki, Greece.

Constantinidi studied at the Athens School of Fine Arts and in 1929 he entered the Académie de la Grande Chaumière in Paris. In 1932, he exhibited at the Salon des Tuileries in Paris.

In 1953, he took part in an exhibition of his works in Thessaloniki.

He also participated in the exhibition of 1962, Greek painter and sculptor in Paris. He wrote many articles for several art magazines in particular in the Cahiers d'Art by Christian Zervos. In 1930, he began painting under the influence of Paul Cézanne, Les Fauves and the Impressionists.

Constantinidi died 1 January 1992 in Paris, France.

== Collections ==
- Charchoune, Musée National d'Art Moderne, Centre Georges Pompidou, Paris.

== Bibliography ==
- Dizionario Universale delle Belle Arti Comanducci.

== Documentary ==
- The life of the artist, Philopoemen Constantinidi, 1997, Play Film, Paris.
