= John Hazzidakis =

Greek scientist and university professor

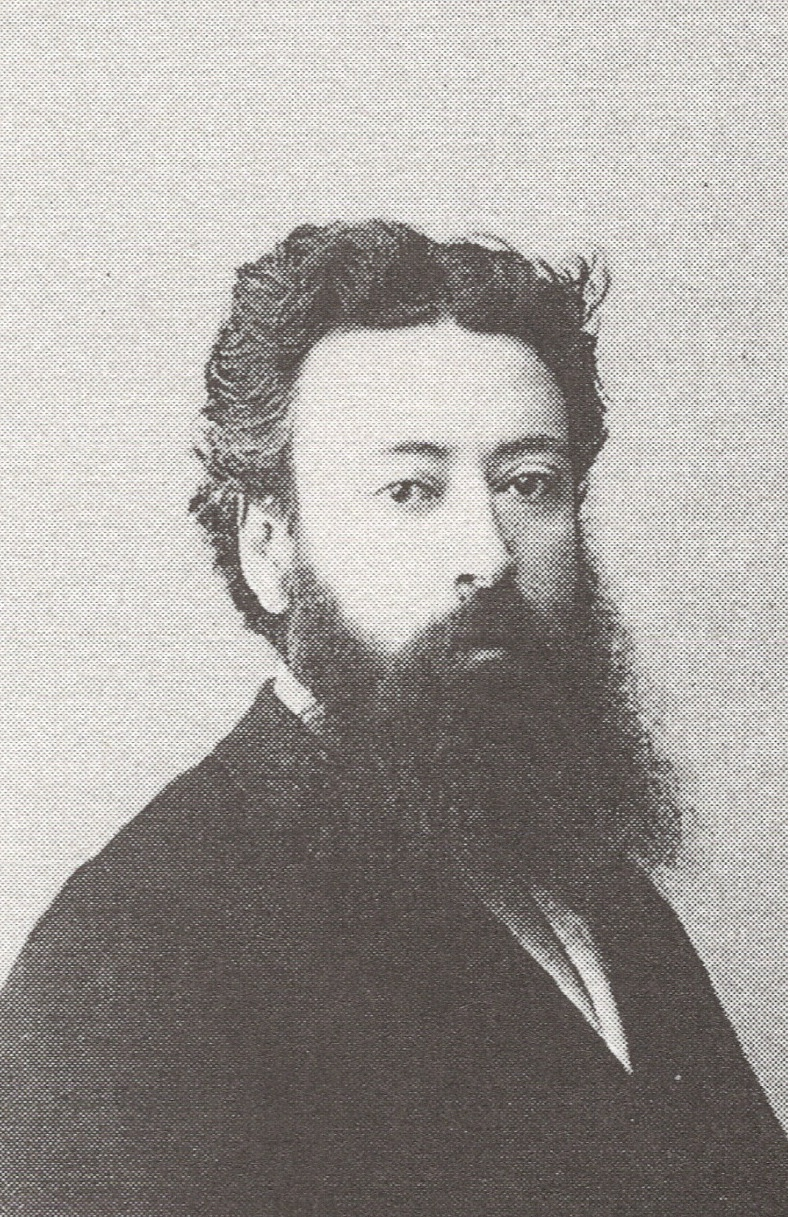
- Born: April 13, 1844; Myrthios Rethymno, Crete, Ottoman Empire
- Died: 1921 (aged 76–77); Athens, Greece
- Education: University of Athens
- Known for: Hazzidakis transform
- Children: Georgios Hatzidakis; Nikolaos Hatzidakis
- Scientific career
- Fields: Classical Mechanics; Physics; Mathematics
- Workplaces: University of Athens
- Doctoral advisors: Vassilios Lakon

Ioannis "John" N. Hazzidakis (Ιωάννης Χατζιδάκις, or Hatzidakis or Chatzidakis, April 13, 1844 – 1921) was a Greek mathematician, physicist, author, and professor. He is one of the most important mathematicians of the modern Greek scientific era. His professor was world renowned Greek mathematician Vassilios Lakon. He also studied with famous German mathematicians Ernst Kummer, Leopold Kronecker, Karl Weierstrass. He systematically worked in the field of research and education. He wrote textbooks in the field of algebra, geometry, and calculus. Hazzidakis essentially adopted some elements of Lacon's Geometry. He introduced the Hazzidakis transform in differential geometry. The Hazzidakis formula for the Hazzidakis transform can be applied in proving Hilbert's theorem on negative curvature, stating that hyperbolic geometry does not have a model in 3-dimensional Euclidean space.

== Biography ==
He was born in Crete, Ottoman Empire in 1844. He completed his basic education in Syros and from 1863 he studied mathematics at the National and Kapodistrian University of Athens. He graduated with a Ph.D. in Mathematics in 1868 and went on a scholarship from the University in Paris and Berlin to continue his studies. He was a student of the Paris school of differential geometry and of Karl Weierstrass in Berlin.

He returned to Greece and was appointed a lecturer in 1880 and then a professor ordinarius in 1884, retiring in 1914 as professor emeritus of mathematics at the University of Athens. He also taught theoretical mechanics at the National Technical University of Athens (1888–1914) and mathematics at the Academy of Sciences (1873–1900) and the Naval Academy of Sciences (1886–1891). At the University of Athens, he was Dean of the Faculty of Philosophy for the academic year 1890-1891, Dean of the School of Sciences for the academic year 1904–1905, and Dean of the School of Philosophy for the academic year 1911–1912. He died in 1921.

He was the father of the linguist Georgios Hatzidakis and the mathematician Nikolaos Hatzidakis.

== Writings ==
According to William Caspar Graustein, a mathematical statement first made by Louis Raffy was published in 1893 with an erroneous proof; Hazzidakis gave a valid proof of the statement in 1897.

Hazzidakis wrote numerous research and pedagogical works, among the latter are:

- Εισαγωγή εις την ανωτέρα άλγεβρα (Introduction to Advanced Algebra);
- Επίπεδος αναλυτική γεωμετρία (Plane Analytic Geometry);
- Διαφορικός λογισμός (Differential Calculus);
- Θεωρητική Μηχανική (Theoretical Mechanics);
- Στοιχειώδης Γεωμετρία (Elementary Geometry);
- Στοιχειώδης Αριθμητική (Elementary Arithmetic);
- Θεωρητική Αριθμητική (Theoretical Arithmetic);
- Ολοκληρωτικός Λογισμός (Integral Calculus).

=== Selected articles ===
The articles of Ιωάννης Χατζιδάκις published in German appeared under the name "J. N. Hazzidakis".

- "Ueber einige Eigenschaften der Flächen mit constantem Krümmungsmaass." Journal für die reine und angewandte Mathematik 88 (1879): 68–73.
- "Ueber eine Eigenschaft der Unterdeterminanten einer symmetrischen Determinante." Journal für die reine und angewandte Mathematik 91 (1881): 238–247.
- "Ueber eine Eigenschaft der Systeme von linearen homogenen Differentialgleichungen." Journal für die reine und angewandte Mathematik 90 (1881): 80–82.
- "Ueber eine Differentialgleichung zweiter Ordnung." Journal für die reine und angewandte Mathematik 90 (1881): 74–79.
- "Ueber die Curven, welche sich so bewegen können, dass sie stets geodätische Linien der von ihnen erzeugten Flächen bleiben." Journal für die reine und angewandte Mathematik 95 (1883): 120–139.
- "Flächenerzeugung durch Krümmungslinien." Journal für die reine und angewandte Mathematik 98 (1885): 49–67.
- "Ueber invariante Differentialausdrücke." Journal für die reine und angewandte Mathematik 104 (1889): 102–115.
- "Der Flächensatz bei der Bewegung auf abwickelbaren Flächen." Journal für die reine und angewandte Mathematik 112 (1893): 140–147.
- "Lineare homogene Differentialgleichungen mit symmetrischer Integraldeterminante." Journal für die reine und angewandte Mathematik 111 (1893): 315–328.
- "Biegung mit Erhaltung der Hauptkrümmungsradien." Journal für die reine und angewandte Mathematik 117 (1897): 42–56
- "Über die Kräfte, die Kegelschnitte als Bahnen hervorrufen." Journal für die reine und angewandte Mathematik 133 (1908): 68–76.

== Bibliography ==
- Zormbala, Konstantina (February 2002). "A Greek Geometry Textbook of the 19th century: Influences of Mathematical Science on Axiomatic in School". Safety Lit. 86 (2): 198–219. PMID 12703272.
- Dervoy, George (1915). Εθνικό και Καποδιστριακό Πανεπιστήμιο Αθηνών Επιστημονική Επετηρίς 1913-1914 Ι [Scientific Yearbook of the University of Athens]. Athens: University of Athens Press.
- Stefanidou, Micheal K. (1952). Εθνικόν και Καποδιστριακόν Πανεπιστήμιον Αθηνών Εκατονταετηρίς 1837-1937 Ιστορία της Φυσικομαθηματικής Σχολής [National and Kapodistrian University of Athens Centenary 1837-1937 History of the Faculty of Physics and Mathematics] (PDF). Athens, Greece: National and Kapodistrian University of Athens.
