= Stephanos Constantinides =

Canadian scholar

- Στέφανος Κωνσταντινίδης
- Born: 28 February 1941 (age 85); Pentalia, Paphos, Cyprus
- Citizenship: Canada
- Occupations: Academic, writer, publisher
- Board member of: Centre for Hellenic Studies and Research Canada, Director

Academic background
- Education: Panthéon-Assas University
- Thesis: The Aegean Dispute (1996)
- Academic advisor: Jacqueline de Romilly

Academic work
- Discipline: Hellenic studies
- Sub-discipline: European Union, Greece, Turkey, Cyprus and the Greek diaspora
- Institutions: University of Quebec at Montreal

Stephanos Constantinides (Greek: Στέφανος Κωνσταντινίδης) was born 28 February 28, 1941 in Cyprus) is a Cypriot-Canadian academic.

== Biography ==
=== Education ===
Stephanos Constantinides was educated at the University of Athens (BA in History and Literature), then in Paris at the Sorbonne. At the Sorbonne, he studied Thucydides with famous scholar Jacqueline de Romilly, with whom he obtained a master's degree. In 1974 he obtained a Ph.D. in political sociology from the University of Paris I and, in 1976, a Ph.D. in political science from Panthéon-Assas University.

=== Career ===
He taught at Laval University, the University of Montreal and the University of Quebec at Montreal. He published several volumes, including Les Grecs du Québec and dozens of articles. He also edited several volumes in the areas of sociology, history and political science. His particular areas of interest include the European Union, Greece, Turkey, Cyprus and the Greek diaspora. He was appointed chairman of the Advisory Council on Cultural Communities and Immigration and member of the Committee on the Implementation of the Action Plan of the Government of Quebec for Cultural Communities (CIPACC). He was also active in various community organizations. He is the director of the Centre for Hellenic Studies and Research Canada - KEEK and Academic Journal 'Hellenic Studies' He has published in three languages: French, Greek and English. He wrote poetry in Greek. 'Anthumes', a poetry collection, was translated by Jacques Bouchard, Professor of Modern Greek Studies at the University of Montreal with an introduction-analysis and explanatory notes. He is currently collaborating with the University of Crete on an education project on Greek Language and Civilization in the Hellenic Diaspora. Also he is a columnist in the leading Greek newspaper in Cyprus, Phileleftheros.

== Bibliography ==
=== Edited volumes ===
- Constantinides, Stephanos; Arnopoulos, Paris (13 December 1996). "The Aegean Dispute". Études helléniques / Hellenic Studies. 4 (2): 05–10. ISSN 0824-8621.
- Constantinides, Stephanos (1996). "Greek Foreign Policy: Theoretical Orientations and Praxis". Études helléniques / Hellenic Studies. 4 (1): 43–62. ISSN 0824-8621.
- Stephanos Constantinides and Athanassios Platia, Thucydides, The Classical Theorist of International Relations, Etudes helléniques / Hellenic Studies 6 (2), 1998, Fall 1998. ISSN 0824-8621
- Constantinides, Stephanos (5 June 2001). "The European Union and Eastern Mediterranean. CYPRUS – GREECE – TURKEY. From the Summit of Helsinki to the Summit of Nice". Études helléniques / Hellenic Studies. 9 (1): 11–15. ISSN 0824-8621.
- Constantinides, Stephanos; Radford, Kathryn (13 December 2002). "The Balkans: A Region in Transition". Études helléniques / Hellenic Studies. 10 (2): 05–07. ISSN 0824-8621.
- Joseph, Joseph; Constantinides, Stephanos (15 December 2003). "Cyprus and the EU: Beyond accession". Études helléniques / Hellenic Studies. 11 (2): 13–20. ISSN 0824-8621.
- Constantinides, Stephanos; Radford, Kathryn; Tassou, Thalia (6 May 2005). "Literatures of the Periphery: the Greek Case". Études helléniques / Hellenic Studies. 13 (1): 05–16. ISSN 0824-8621.

=== Publications ===
- Stephanos Constantinides, Le fait français et la réalité multiculturelle au Québec in Le Québec français et l'école à la clientèle pluriethnique, contributions à une réflexion, Conseil supérieur de la langue française, 1987. ISBN 2-551-08896-8
- Stephanos Constantinides (1983). Les Grecs du Québec : analyse historique et sociologique [The Greeks of Quebec: A Historical and Sociological Analysis] (in French). Montreal. ISBN 2-920615-00-9.
- Stephanos Constantnindes, Anthumes, Montréal, Editions O Metoikos - Le Métèque, 1984. ISBN 2-920615-91-2
- Stephanos Constantinides, The Emergence of a New Ottoman Model: A New Foreign Policy in Turkey, in The New Balkans: Disintegration and Reconstruction, edited by George A. Kourvetaris and alias, Northern Illinois University, New York, East European Monographs, Boulder, 2002. ISBN 0-88033-498-3
- Stephanos Constantinides, Diaspora et construction de l’Etat national grec in Arméniens et Grecs en diaspora, approches comparatives, sous la direction de Michel Bruneau et Ioannis Hassiotis, Ecole Française d’Athènes, 2005. ISBN 978-2-86958-205-7
- "Les Grecs du Québec et les Médias", in Etudes helléniques / Hellenic Studies, Vol. I, No.1, Spring 1983. ISSN 0824-8621
- "Ethnicité et pluralisme culturel", "in International Journal of Community action. Vol. 14/54 (1985).
- "De l'ethnicité en tant que construit idéologique "in Canadian Ethnic Studies / Ethnic Studies in Canada, vol.XVIII, No. 2.1986
- "Turkey: The Emergence of a New Foreign Policy, The Neo-Ottoman Model," Journal of Political and Military Sociology, Winter 1996 (Northern Illinois University).
- "Greek Foreign Policy: Theoretical Directions and Practice", Etudes helléniques / Hellenic Studies, Vol. 4 (1), Spring, 1996. ISSN 0824-8621
- "The Greek-Americans and U.S. Foreign Policy Since 1950" (in Cooperation With Alexander Kitroeff), Etudes helléniques / Hellenic Studies, Vol. 6 (1), Spring, 1998. ISSN 0824-8621
