= Vassilios Lakon =

Greek mathematician and university professor

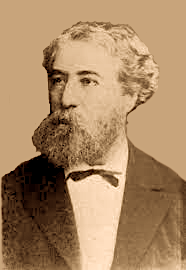
- Born: 1830; Kea, Greece
- Died: 1900 (aged 68–69); Athens, Greece
- Education: University of Athens; Sorbonne
- Known for: Lakon's Axioms
- Spouse: Aspasia
- Children: Kostas Karthaios; George Lakon
- Father: Ioannis Lakon
- Scientific career
- Fields: Astronomy; Physics; Mathematics
- Workplaces: University of Athens
- Doctoral advisors: Dimitrios Stroumpos; Joseph Bertrand
- Doctoral students: John Hazzidakis; Cyparissos Stephanos

Vassilios Lakon (Greek: Βασίλειος Λάκων or Greek: Βασιλείου Ι Λάκωνος, 1831–1900) was an astronomer, mathematician, experimental physicist, philologist, author, and professor. He was a pioneer in 19th-century Greek geometry. He did research in the fields of physics and mathematics. His professors were world-renowned physicist Dimitrios Stroumpos and astronomer Georgios Konstantinos Vouris. He also studied in France with Joseph Bertrand. He was exposed to the works of Joseph Liouville, Augustin-Louis Cauchy, Bernard Lamy, and Jacques Charles François Sturm. Lakon's math textbooks were used in high schools across Greece during the second half of the 19th century.

Lakon was born on the island of Kea. He was from a prominent family. He was the first student to receive a doctorate degree in Mathematics from the University of Athens in 1850. He continued his post-doctoral studies in France. He returned to Greece. He introduced modern French mathematical concepts to Greek education. He was involved in high school and higher education. He spent the rest of his life teaching and writing science books. He participated in the scientific debates of the time. His axiomatic foundation expanded Euclid's Elements. He presented the idea of motion relative to geometry and discussed the rotation and placement of geometric figures on a plane and in space. He also contributed to the fields of electromagnetism and astronomy. His first son was the famous Greek poet Kostas Karthaios. His other son George Lakon was a botanist.

== Biography ==
He was born in Kea in 1831. His father's name was Ioannis. His brother was a poet and legal writer Dimitrios I. Lakon. Vassilios married Aspasia and had two sons. His oldest son was the famous Greek poet Kostas Karthaios (Κώστας Καρθαίος). He was initially born (Cleandros Lakon) Κλέανδρος Λάκων. Vassilio's second son was Giorgios Lakon. He was a famous botanist. Vassilios obtained his early education on the island of Kea. He attended high school ( Hellenic School or Gymnasium) in Athens. He was accepted at the University of Athens. His professors in Athens were world-renowned physicist Dimitrios Stroumpos and astronomer Georgios Konstantinos Vouris. He was the first student to receive a doctoral degree in Mathematics from the University of Athens in 1850. He graduated with honors and was awarded 100 drachmas. He decided to follow the path of his professor Dimitrios Stroumpos. He continued his post-doctoral studies in Paris from (1850-1854) at the Sorbonne.

Europe and France were undergoing a modern Scientific Revolution. Greece and Italy were under the restrictive educational systems of Korydalism. England, France, and Germany were undergoing the Age of Enlightenment in science. Francis Bacon embraced science while Italy imposed the inquisition on Galileo. The Greek community did the same to Methodios Anthrakites during the Methodios affair. Lakon and his contemporaries embraced European education and promoted new ideas. Lakon studied in France with Joseph Bertrand. He was exposed to the works of Joseph Liouville, Augustin-Louis Cauchy, Bernard Lamy, and Jacques Charles François Sturm. He brought the new revolutionary ideas back to Modern Greece. He shared modern concepts with his students. When he returned to Greece he became part of the new National Observatory of Athens. He assisted world-renowned astronomer Georgios Konstantinos Vouris. Lakon also helped revolutionize the Greek school system. He became a high school teacher. He was also lecturing at the University of Athens. He was involved in high school and university education from 1854 until 1900. He wrote numerous textbooks in the field of physics and mathematics for high school and college education. He inspired countless students namely famous Greek mathematician John Hazzidakis.

Lakon was a teacher at the Second High school of Athens (2nd Gymnasium of Athens) from 1854 to 1864. He was an adjunct professor of experimental physics at the University of Athens from 1854 to 1862. In 1862, he became an adjunct professor of pure and applied mathematics. The next year he taught more classes in mathematics at the university. He started to become popular within the Greek scientific community. The government approved several of his textbooks for high school and college education. He shared the modern European scientific advancements he learned with Greece. Most of the early college and high school textbooks were translations of French and German scientific advancements. Because Lakon was familiar with Joseph Bertrand, he translated and promoted his textbook in 1857. The translation was called Elements of Arithmetic (Στοιχεία Αριθμητικής). The first period of Greek education promoted by Lakon and his contemporaries was from 1840-1880 it was heavily influenced by European education.

Éléments de Géométrie written by Adrien-Marie Legendre greatly rearranged and simplified some of the propositions of Euclid's Elements to create a more effective textbook. The translation was very popular in Greece during the first period of education. In 1868, Lakon became a full professor at the university and by 1880 he was the rector of the institution for one year. In his speech, he elaborated on the significant discoveries of non-Euclidean geometry. He referenced Aristotle's theories, postulates, primary concepts, and the role of axioms. By the 1880s, Lakon and his student Ioannis Chatzidakis demonstrated their independent development in their textbooks. The only approved licensed textbooks for High school and college education were written by Lakon and Ioannis Chatzidakis. Lakon wrote Elements of Geometry (Στοιχεία Γεωμετρίας) in 1882. In his textbook, he outlined his interpretation of axiomatic geometry. He was very active within the scientific community, constantly interacting with his contemporaries in Greece namely Dimitrios Stroumpos and Timoleon Argyropoulos.

Lakon supported the idea that it was impossible to experimentally confirm the indefinite divisibility of matter. Lakon distinguished between the mass of a body and its weight. He computed the acceleration rate of gravity in various cities up to four decimal places. His contemporary Antonios Damaskinos supported the existence of a vacuum between small particles and in space between celestial bodies. Argyopoulos and Lakon supported the belief that the Aether did not allow for the existence of an absolute vacuum. Lakon and Argyropoulous supported the famous Foucault pendulum. Lakon also did extensive research in the field of electromagnetism. He died in Athens in 1900.

== Lakon's Geometry ==
In his book Elements of Geometry published in 1882 he focused on axiomatic foundation, Lakon and his contemporaries expanded on Euclid’s Elements of Mathematics. Euclid used two postulates for straight lines, and no postulate for planes. Lacon proposed an axiom and two postulates for straight lines. He also introduced a postulate for planes. His work was heavily influenced by the acceptable ideas of the time namely the works of Robert Simson, Wolfgang Bolyai, Hermann von Helmholtz, and David Hilbert. Lakon was critical towards Euclidean geometry. He felt it was ambiguous and lacked definitions for certain notions such as equality, excess, and defect. Lakon utilized the logical-deductive character of geometry. He superimposed Aristotle's epistemological theory in his deductive analysis. There was a growing debate among German mathematicians in the 19th century centered around the definition of the plane. Some mathematicians felt it was ambiguously defined by Euclid.

Euclid vaguely defined the plane. He stated that a plane surface is a surface which lies evenly with the straight lines on itself. The definition is similar to that of a straight line: a straight line is a line which lies evenly with the points on itself. Robert Simson translated Euclid's The Elements of Euclid (1756) and defined the plane as the surface in which any two points being taken, the straight line between them lies wholly in that superficies (surface). The line is known as Simson line. Lakon accepted Simson's definition of the plane. Lakon proved the existence of a surface using Simson line He defined it as a plane. Lakon presented geometry as a theory of solid bodies using the rotations of straight lines about one axis utilizing the placement and inversion of objects in space. Lakon was influenced by the works of Hermann von Helmholtz in dealing with motion while Wolfgang Bolyai influenced Lakon's interpretation of the sphere. Lakon's student John Hazzidakis incorporated some of his works into his own textbooks.

Lakon's geometric analysis consisted of nine axioms and postulates. He presented primitive notions as notions of area, boundary, solid, surface and line. He also elaborated on position, continuity, point, part, and whole. He presented the idea of motion relative to geometry. He examined it as the notion of motion. He discussed the rotation and placement of geometric figures on a plane and in space. He used the concept to prove theorems and define geometric notions. Lakon viewed the sphere as the simplest geometric figure. Lakon organized his geometric perspective as a theory of solid bodies.

=== Axiom ===
1. Given two unequal straight lines, the lesser, if sufficiently multiplied, can be made to exceed the larger.

=== Definition ===
1. Two figures are called congruent if either of them can be shifted without changing it so that it falls onto the other, taking such a position that both figures can occupy the same space, that is each point of either of these also is a point of the other.
2. A plane surface is a surface such that each straight line connecting any two points of the surface lies entirely on the surface"

=== Postulate ===
1. Every figure can change its position without changing itself, so that a given point of it falls onto another given point, occupying itself the same position as the other.
2. Given two arbitrary points A and B of a solid or surface, then, while A and B remain stationary, the figure can move so as to occupy ever new positions until it returns to its initial position.
3. Of all lines that can be traced between the points A and B, there is one and only one that remains stationary when a figure containing that line rotates about A and B. This line is called a straight line.
4. There exists a surface such that each straight line connecting two arbitrary points of the surface lies entirely on this surface.
5. Given two straight lines, it is possible, after one endpoint of either is placed onto an endpoint of the other, to move either so that a second point of one shall fall onto the other.
6. There always exists a straight line that exceeds any straight line containing two arbitrary points of a given figure".
7. Every figure can be situated in such a position that three given points of it shall fall on a given plane.
8. The points which the straight line AB can go through when it moves about one of its endpoints A, are points of a solid. This solid is called a sphere.

=== Theorem ===
1. The surface which is the locus of all straight lines that are perpendicular at the same point of a given straight line has the property that the straight line defined by two arbitrary points of the surface lies entirely on that surface.

== Literary works ==
Books and Articles authored by Vassilios Lakon
Date	Title	Title in English
1857	Στοιχεία Αριθμητικής	Elements of Arithmetic (High School Textbook)
1863	Στοιχεία Φυσικής	Elements of Physics (High School Textbook)
1866	Άλγεβρα	Algebra (High School Textbook)
1881	Περί των Αρχών της Γεωμετρίας	Principles of Geometry
1882	Στοιχεία Γεωμετρίας	Elements of Geometry
1888	Στοιχεία Κοσμογραφίας	Elements of Cosmography

== See also ==
- Hilbert's axioms
- Pasch's axiom

== Bibliography ==
- Vlahakis, George (2021). Notions of Physics in Natural Philosophy. Newcastle, UK: Cambridge Scholars Publishing. ISBN 978-1847184306.
- Ricks, David; Beaton, Roderick (2016). The Making of Modern Greece Nationalism, Romanticism, and the Uses of the Past (1797–1896). Burlington, VT: Ashgate Publishing Limited. ISBN 9781317024729.
- Zormbala, Konstantina (February 2002). "A Greek Geometry Textbook of the 19th century: Influences of Mathematical Science on Axiomatic in School". Safety Lit. 86 (2): 198–219. PMID 12703272.
- Lakon, Vassilios (1882). Στοιχεία Γεωμετρίας [Elements of Geometry (Stoicheia Geometrias]. Athens GR: Athens University Press.
- Volkert, Klaus; Menghini, Marta; Barbin, Évelyne (2019). Descriptive Geometry, The Spread of a Polytechnic Art The Legacy of Gaspard Monge. Cham, Switzerland: Springer International Publishing. ISBN 9783030148089.
- Asimakopoulou, F.; Chatzis, Kostas (2008). Σπουδαστές στη Γαλλία, Μηχανικοί στην Ελλάδα. Ο Κόσμος των Ελλήνων Μηχανικών, 19ος - 20ου αιώνα [Greek Scientists that Studied in France from 1800-1900] (PDF). Athens, Greece: University of Athens.
- Stefanidou, Micheal K. (1952). Εθνικόν και Καποδιστριακόν Πανεπιστήμιον Αθηνών Εκατονταετηρίς 1837-1937 Ιστορία της Φυσικομαθηματικής Σχολής [National and Kapodistrian University of Athens Centenary 1837-1937 History of the Faculty of Physics and Mathematics] (PDF). Athens, Greece: National and Kapodistrian University of Athens.
