= Dimitrios Stroumpos =

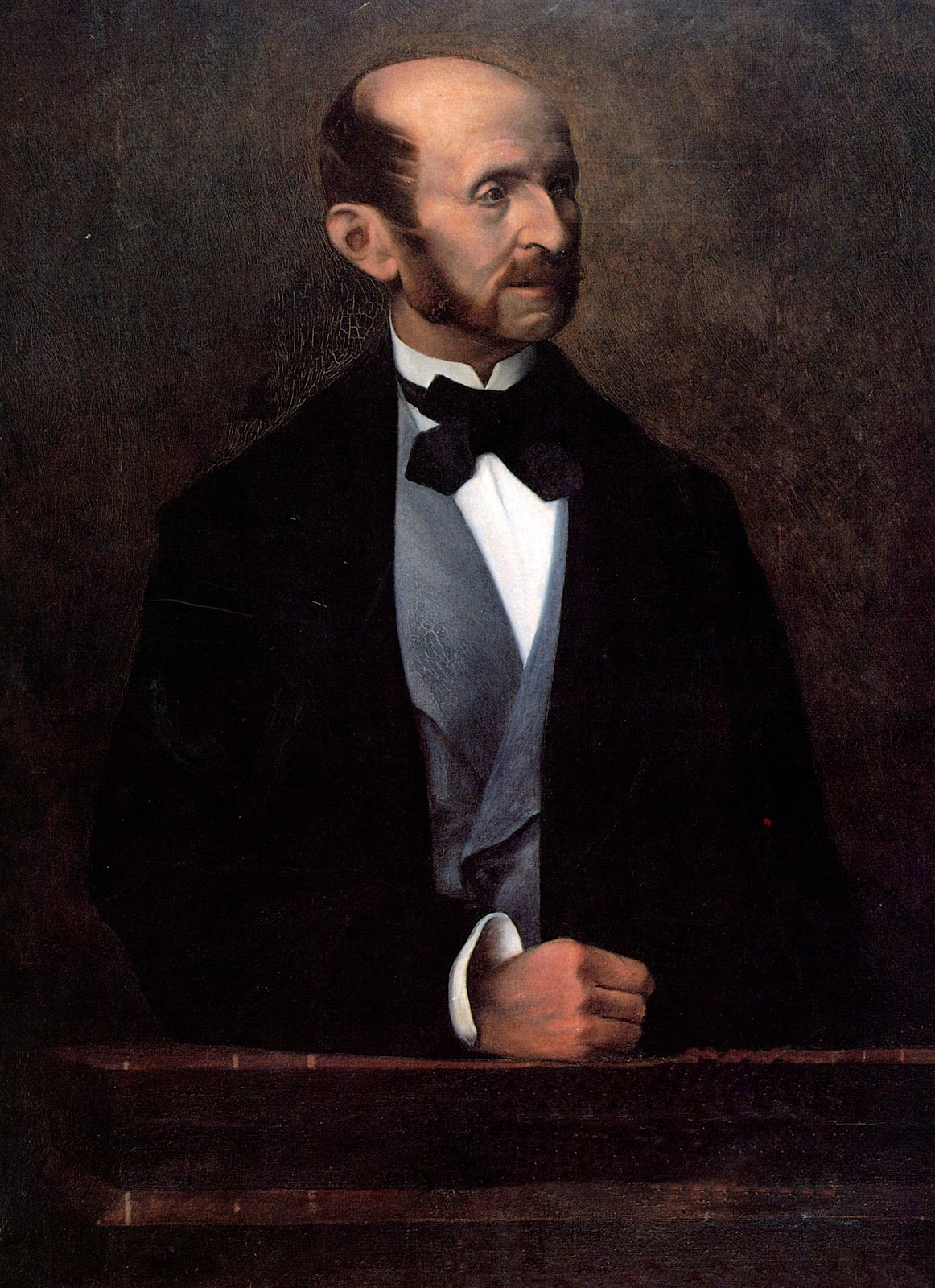
- Born: 1806; Koukouli, Ioannina, Greece
- Died: 5 February 1890 (aged 83–84); Athens, Greece
- Education: University of Geneva; École Polytechnique
- Known for: Strombo compass Electricity and Magnetism; Modern Scientific Observation in Greece; Study of Hail
- Scientific career
- Fields: Astronomy; Physics
- Workplaces: University of Athens
- Doctoral students: Vassilios Lakon
- Other notable students: Timoleon Argyropoulos

Dimitrios Stroumpos (Greek: Δημήτριος Στρούμπος; 1806 - February 5, 1890) was an astronomer, physicist, mathematician, author, and professor. He was a theoretical physicist. He was a pioneer in 19th-century Greek physics. He helped develop the physics department at the University of Athens. He was the dean. He did extensive research in the field of physics namely: the study of air and energy fields, electricity, magnetism, and telephones. He also studied the motion of molecules and developed a system of scientific observation. He developed the Strombo compass. His contemporaries at the time were Greek scientists Vassilios Lakon, Georgios Konstantinos Vouris, and Ioannis Papadakis. He was replaced as the chair of the physics department by his student world-renowned physicist Timoleon Argyropoulos after his death.

Dimitrios was born in Koukouli, Ioannina. He was part of a very important family. The family eventually migrated to Corfu. Both Dimitrios and his brother were educated overseas. Dimitrios attended two prestigious institutions in Europe. He attended the University of Geneva and the École polytechnique. He was inspired by Henri Victor Regnault. He eventually moved back to Greece and became part of the University of Athens. He was also an instructor at Evelpidon. He was part of the movement to eradicate the religious suppression of science. The Christian religion surpassed new scientific ideas for hundreds of years within the Greek community. A notable incident was the Methodios Affair. Dimitrios represented the dawn of a new era of scientific thought in Greece. He researched and promoted every new physics idea and kept open communication with all the prominent European scientists at the time.

== Biography ==
Dimitrios was born in 1806 in the village of Koukouli, Ioannina. His grandfather was Konstantinos. He was a very wealthy Greek merchant from Koukouli, Ioannina. Konstantinos had two children Stefanos and Georgios. Dimitri's father was Stefanos. His uncle was Georgios. Dimitrios completed his basic education in Ioannina. His teacher was prominent educator Athanassios Sakellarios. The family moved to Patras after the Greek War of Independence in 1830. Dimitrios and his brother Petros Stroumbos studied at the Ionian Academy. Ioannis Kapodistrias sent Dimitrios and Petros to study in Europe on a scholarship from the Greek government. Dimitrios studied mathematics and physics his brother studied law. Dimitrios initially studied physics at the University of Geneva in Switzerland and he also traveled to Paris to study at the École polytechnique. Records indicate he was at the École polytechnique in 1829 and 1852 indicating that he continued to advance his education with the evolving technologies of the time. André-Marie Ampère and Joseph Fourier were notable faculty associated with the institution at the time. Notable students attending the prestigious school while Dimitrios was at the institution were: Henri Victor Regnault, Joseph Louis François Bertrand, Auguste Bravais and Hervé Faye. Dimitrios graduated with a Phd with the highest honors. He returned to Athens in 1838 and began work at Evelpidon. He also became a professor at the newly founded University of Athens. He was an adjunct professor from 1839 to 1844 and full professor from 1844 to 1890.

The newly founded monarchy was full of problems. There was constant friction between the rebels that founded the new state and King Otto. The palace of the king was completed and a huge rebellion ensued known as the Rebellion of the 3rd of September in 1843. The rebels demanded a constitutional monarchy and the departure of the Bavarian officials. The university played a vital role in politics since its inception. Stroumpos and other faculty members were constantly dragged into the political debate. Higher education played a crucial role in politics. Regrettably, one of the most important Greek-Austrian astronomers Georgios Konstantinos Vouris was sent back to Austria due to the political uncertainty and his association with the king's motherland during the 1850s. Dimitrios was named the dean of the University of Athens from 1858 to 1859. During this time his grade school teacher Athanassios Sakellarios received a Phd from the university.

He gave a notable speech in September 1858. Stroumpos gave an incredible speech outlining the importance of modern scientific advancement. Early in his speech he discussed Francis Bacon, Galileo Galilei, and Isaac Newtown. The three scientists formed the basis of his scientific knowledge. He saw them as heroes that were persecuted and unrecognized. He criticized the church's persecution of scientific education for hundreds of years and corydalism. He also emphasized the importance of following the modern scientific advancements of the time. He discussed the work of his classmate Henri Victor Regnault. He also named the academic research of Edmond Becquerel and Michael Faraday. He also equated Michael Faraday to the genius of sir Isaac Newton. Towards the end of his historic speech he made six points about scientific advancement a) sciences independence from religion was crucial, b) he stressed the importance of experimental method, c) the search for truth, d) investigation on how the world was created, he was inline with darwins theory of evolution, e) scientists should search for natural laws to explain all phenomena, and f) special theories or hypotheses should be established to explain all phenomena.

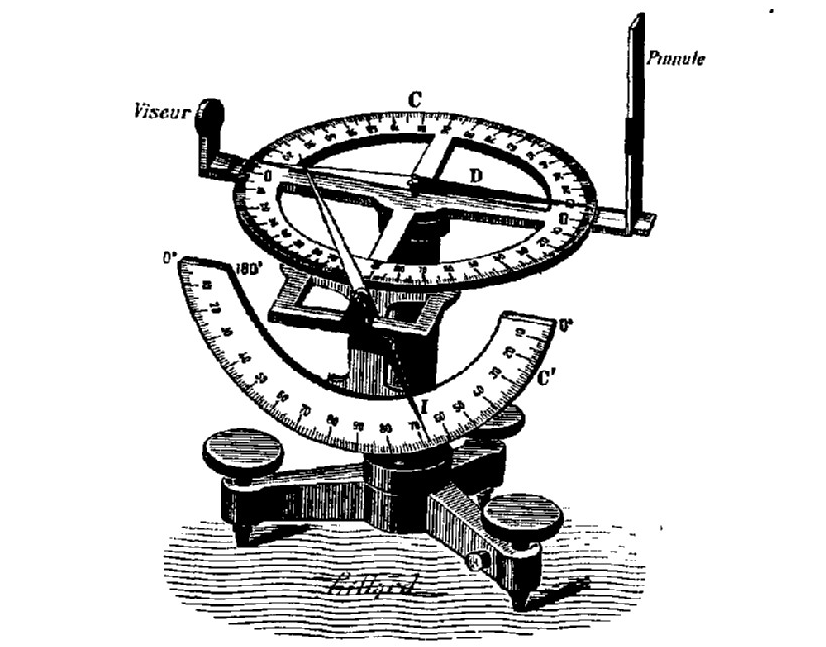
Strombo's compass

On May 10, 1859, a political incident called the skiadika (σκιαδικά) occurred involving students of the university and Stroumbos. By October 1862, King Otto was exiled to never return to Greece. By the late 1860s, his student was Greek physicist Timoleon Argyropoulos. He decided to study in France following the path of Stroumpos. Stroumpos was in constant communication with the international scientific community namely France. He was constantly publishing research articles in different periodicals. In the 1880s he invented an instrument for measuring magnetic declination and inclination known as the stroumbo compass. He did extensive research on Archimedes' principle and air. He also introduced new European concepts to Greek higher education. He studied the weights of objects. He did extensive research on the function of levers. He used atwood's machine to demonstrate classical mechanics. He theorized that static electricity directly produces the same effect as dynamic electricity, without the intervention of any electric current. He researched the works of Wilhelm Holtz namely dealing with electric machines. He also studied the electromagnetism and refraction of light. He was part of the rise of the wave theory of light and optical theory. He wrote countless books and articles on different physical processes. By now Greek scientists began to utilize the mathematical interpretation of the physical world and contributed to the founding of modern physics. He died in Athens on February 5, 1890.

== Literary works ==
Books and Articles authored by Dimitrios Stroumpos
Date	Title	Title in English
1832	Η Ελλάς, Πονημάτιον, Παρίσι	The Pain of Greece Paris
1854	Περί ανατροφής και Παιδεύσεως	Upbringing and Education
1858	Περί των Γνώσεων και των Δοξασιών των Αρχαίων και των Νεώτερων ως Προς τα Φυσικά Φαινόμενα και των Μεθόδων του Ερευνάν Αυτά,	On the Knowledge and Beliefs of Ancient and Modern Scientists Concerning Natural Phenomena and the Methods of Investigating Them
1864	Επιστημονικά Παράδοξα	Scientific Paradoxes
1869	Περί Αέρος και των Ενεργειών Αυτού	About Air and Its Energies
1873	Nouvelle expérience sur la double réfraction	Experiment on Double Refraction
1876	The Theory of Holtz Electrical Machine	The Theory of Holtz Electrical Machine
1878	Περί Tηλεφώνου	A Study of the Telephone
1870s	De la machine Gramme	Analysis of the Gramme machine
1881	Αι Των Υλικών Μορίων Κινήσεις	A Study of William Crookes Motions of Material Molecules
1883	Περί των Μαγνητικών Στοιχείων και των Γήινων Ηλεκτρικών Ρευμάτων Γενικώς	A General Study of the Magnetic Elements and Terrestrial Electric Currents
1888	Dissertations de Physique	Essays in Physics

== See also ==
- Birefringence
- Electrostatic generator

== Bibliography ==
- Hardin, Jeff; Binzley, Ronald A.; Numbers, Ronald L. (2018). The Warfare Between Science and Religion the Idea That Wouldn't Die. Baltimore, M.D.: Johns Hopkins University Press. ISBN 9781421426198.
- Savaidou, Irini Mergoupi (2010). 'Δημόσιος Λόγος περί Επιστήμης στην Ελλάδα, 1870–1900: Εκλαϊκευτικά Εγχειρήματα στο Πανεπιστήμιο Αθηνών, στους Πολιτιστικούς Συλλόγους και στα Περιοδικά [Public Discourse about Science in Greece, 1870-1900: Population Projects at the University of Athens, in Cultural Associations and Magazines] (PDF). Athens, GR: Department of History and Philosophy of Science of the University of Athens.
- Sakellaropoulos, D.K. (1891). Απόλλων Μηνιαίοι Περιοδικόν Σύγγραμμα [Apollo Historical Essays Volume Z Issue 73]. Piraeus, Greece: Palamidis Press.
- Asimakopoulou, F.; Chatzis, Kostas (2008). Σπουδαστές στη Γαλλία, Μηχανικοί στην Ελλάδα. Ο Κόσμος των Ελλήνων Μηχανικών, 19ος - 20ου αιώνα [Greek Scientists that Studied in France from 1800-1900] (PDF). Athens, Greece: University of Athens.
- Tampakis, Costas (2013). Sciences and religion: Their interaction in the borders of Europe (1832-1915) (PDF). Athens, GR: Colloque International, Europe et Sciences Modernes, Histoire d’un Engendrement Mutuel, Nantes, 21-22/2/2013.
- Stefanidou, Micheal K. (1952). Εθνικόν και Καποδιστριακόν Πανεπιστήμιον Αθηνών Εκατονταετηρίς 1837-1937 Ιστορία της Φυσικομαθηματικής Σχολής [National and Kapodistrian University of Athens Centenary 1837-1937 History of the Faculty of Physics and Mathematics] (PDF). Athens, Greece: National and Kapodistrian University of Athens.
