= List of LMU Munich people =

This is a list of people associated with LMU Munich in Germany.

== Nobel laureates ==
=== Nobel Prize in Physics ===
1. Ferenc Krausz (Physics 2023; professor and chair of experimental physics since 2004)
2. Theodor W. Hänsch (Physics 2005; professor, 2001-02 Chairman of the Physics Department)
3. Wolfgang Ketterle (Physics 2001; PhD physics 1986)
4. Gerd Binnig (Physics 1986; Honorary Professor since 1987; 1987-1995 Director of IBM physics group at LMU Munich)
5. Hans Bethe (Physics 1967; PhD)
6. Wolfgang Pauli (Physics 1945; PhD)
7. Werner Heisenberg (Physics 1932; PhD)
8. Gustav Hertz (Physics 1926; student 1907-1908)
9. Johannes Stark (Physics 1919; PhD)
10. Max Planck (Physics 1918; PhD)
11. Max von Laue (Physics 1914; student one semester 1901-02, Privatdozent 1909, Honorary Doctorate)
12. Wilhelm Wien (Physics 1911; professor of physics since 1920)
13. Wilhelm Conrad Röntgen (Physics 1901; professor chair since 1900)

=== Nobel Prize in Chemistry ===
1. Gerhard Ertl (Chemistry 2007; student 1958-1959, professor 1973-1986)
2. Hartmut Michel (Chemistry 1988; student lab work 1972/73)
3. Ernst Otto Fischer (Chemistry 1973; professor 1957-1959; honorary doctorate 1972)
4. Otto Hahn (Chemistry 1944; PhD student)
5. Adolf Butenandt (Chemistry 1939; professor)
6. Richard Kuhn (Chemistry 1938; PhD)
7. Peter Debye (Chemistry 1936; PhD)
8. Hans Fischer (Chemistry 1930; MD 1908)
9. Heinrich Wieland (Chemistry 1927; PhD)
10. Richard Adolf Zsigmondy (Chemistry 1925; professor)
11. Richard Willstätter (Chemistry 1915; diploma & PhD)
12. Eduard Buchner (Chemistry 1907; PhD & professor)
13. Adolf von Baeyer (Chemistry 1905; professor)
14. Hermann Emil Fischer (Chemistry 1902; professor 1875-1881)

=== Nobel Prize in Physiology or Medicine ===
1. Günter Blobel (Physiology or Medicine 1999; studied medicine at LMU Munich)
2. Bert Sakmann (Physiology or Medicine 1991; medical assistant 1968, MD 1974)
3. Karl von Frisch (Physiology or Medicine 1973; student, assistant since 1910 & professor since 1925)
4. Feodor Lynen (Physiology or Medicine 1964; student since 1930, PhD Mar. 1937, professor since 1947)
5. Hans Adolf Krebs (Physiology or Medicine 1953; student, 1921 transferred to LMU Munich, started his clinical training, 1923 completed his medical exams)
6. Otto Loewi (Physiology or Medicine 1936; student)
7. Hans Spemann (Physiology or Medicine 1935; 1893-1894 studied at LMU Munich for clinical training)

=== Nobel Prize in Literature ===
1. Thomas Mann (Literature 1929; student)

== Politicians and public figures ==
=== Chancellor of Germany ===
- Konrad Adenauer, Chancellor of Germany (1949–1963)

=== President of Germany ===
- Karl Carstens, President of Germany (1979–1984)
- Gustav Heinemann, President of Germany (1969–1974)
- Roman Herzog, President of Germany (1994–1999)
- Theodor Heuss, President of Germany (1949–1959)

=== Anti-Nazi resistance activists ===
- Willi Graf, anti-Nazi resistance activist in the White Rose rebellion
- Eric Voegelin, anti-Nazi philosopher
- Dietrich von Hildebrand, anti-Nazi philosopher, former student, and later professor at LMU Munich. Founder of the anti-Nazi newspaper The Christian Corporative State while living in exile in Austria before the Anschluss
- Kurt Huber, well known professor during the World War II era; anti-Nazi resistance activist in the White Rose rebellion
- Ernst Munzinger, Abwehr Lieutenant Colonel turned anti-Nazi
- Christoph Probst, anti-Nazi resistance activist in the White Rose rebellion
- Alexander Schmorell, anti-Nazi resistance activist in the White Rose rebellion
- Hans Scholl, anti-Nazi resistance activist, leader of the White Rose rebellion
- Sophie Scholl, anti-Nazi resistance activist in the White Rose rebellion

=== Other politicians and public figures ===
- John Dalberg-Acton, 1st Baron Acton (1834–1902), British historian and politician
- Valdas Adamkus, President of Lithuania (1998–2003, 2004–2009)
- Kunigunde Bachl, member of the Landtag of Schleswig-Holstein
- Ümit Özdağ, Turkish political scientist, academic, writer and politician
- Jaladat Ali Badirkhan, Kurdish writer, linguist, journalist and political activist
- Dora Bakoyannis, Greek Foreign Affairs Minister, outgoing Mayor of Athens
- Pope Benedict XVI, Pope (2005–2013) and former theologian
- Dr. Diether Haenicke, President of Western Michigan University (1985–1998); Interim President (2006–2007)
- Michael Haußner, a former State Secretary
- Erwin Huber, leader of the Christian Social Union (2007–2009)
- Sir Allama Muhammad Iqbal, poet and philosopher of Pakistan
- Mihail Neamțu, member of the Romanian Chamber of Deputies (2024–present)
- Conrad Krez, member of the Wisconsin State Assembly
- King Ludwig III of Bavaria
- Birgitt Ory, German Ambassador to Nigeria, former Director General of the German Institute Taipei
- Manfred Wörner, Secretary General of NATO (1988–1994)
- Michael Zickerick, former German Ambassador to Moldova and Director General of the German Institute Taipei

== Other notable alumni ==
- Andrea Ablasser, immunologist
- Ludwig Bachhofer, art historian
- Frank Baffoe, Ghanaian economist, diplomat and businessman
- Celadet Bedir Khan, Kurdish politician and writer
- Ingeborg Beling, ethologist in the field of chronobiology
- Hermann Boehm (1884–1962), German eugenicist, professor of "racial hygiene" and SA-Sanitäts-Gruppenführer
- Werner Braune (1909–1951), Nazi SS officer, executed for war crimes
- Bertolt Brecht, poet, playwright, and theatre director
- Gisela Bulla (1932–2018), archeologist, author, and politician
- Myriam Charpentier, British molecular biologist and researcher of nuclear calcium signaling
- William Lane Craig, Christian theologian and philosopher
- Stefan Dassler, author of business-related non-fiction books
- Georg Dohrn, German conductor
- Bernadette Eberlein (born 1964), dermatologist, allergologist, and researcher
- Robert Falkner, political scientist
- Claudia Fischbach, biomedical engineer
- Aloys Fischer, educationalist and statistician
- Wilhelm Frick (1877–1946), Nazi official, executed for war crimes
- Diego García-Borreguero, Director of the Sleep Research Institute in Madrid, Spain
- Maren Gaulke, (born 1955), German herpetologist
- Karl Gebhardt (1897–1948), Nazi SS physician who conducted criminal medical experiments; executed for war crimes
- Helmut Gernsheim, photo-historian, collector, and photographer
- Gerd Gigerenzer, psychologist
- Elke Gryglewski (born 1965), German political scientist and historian
- Claus Guth (born 1964), theatre and opera director
- Yvonne Hackenbroch (1912–2012), British museum curator and historian of jewellery (last Jew to earn a PhD there before World War II)
- Roger Härtl, neurosurgeon
- Wolfhart Hauser, businessman, chief executive of Intertek
- Rudolf Hess, Nazi official acting as Adolf Hitler's deputy in the Nazi Party
- Werner Herzog, film director
- Henry Hochheimer (1818–1912), German-American rabbi
- Rolf Hofmeier, (born 1939), German economist and Africanist
- Ödön von Horváth, German-writing Austro-Hungarian-born playwright and novelist
- Waldemar Hoven (1903–1948), Nazi physician executed for war crimes
- Rolf Issels, medical oncologist and biochemist
- Edward Rand, American medievalist
- Sara Murray Jordan, American gastroenterologist
- Andreas Kaplan, German University professor and Rector
- Alexander Kekulé, German doctor and biochemist
- Inga Koerte, neuroradiologist, scientific researcher and medical academic
- Ernst Lengyel, gynecologic oncologist, scientific researcher and medical academic
- Christof Loy, opera director
- Xaver Landerer (1809–1885), one of the first chemistry professors in Modern Greece.
- Josef Mengele, SS officer and Auschwitz physician; earned a doctorate in anthropology
- Hercules Anastasios Mitsopoulos (1816–1892), father of modern natural sciences in Greece.
- Wolf-Dieter Montag (1924–2018), German physician, and international sports administrator
- Humberto Fernández Morán, Venezuelan scientist, inventor of the diamond knife
- Dieter Nörr, scholar of ancient law
- Michael Otto, head of German Otto Group
- Sergey Padyukov, American architect
- Dušan David Pařízek, Czech theatre director
- John Piper, reformed theologian, author and pastor
- Otto Friedrich Ranke, physiologist
- Jan Rohls, Reformed theologian
- Marko Sarstedt, Researcher and academic
- Berta Scharrer, U.S.-based endocrinologist and scientific researcher (d. 1995)
- Avinoam Shalem, Israeli art historian, director of the American Academy in Rome
- Carl Sternheim, German playwright and short story writer
- Antony Theodore, German poet and social worker
- Heinz Hermann Thiele, German billionaire businessman and the chairman of Knorr-Bremse
- Blake Ragsdale Van Leer, President of Georgia Tech and United States Army Officer
- Fanny Fee Werther, German journalist and TV host at Welt
- Martin H. Wiggers, German economist, editor, author and businessman
- Cüneid Zapsu, Turkish businessman
- Gottlieb Olpp, medical missionary, research and author
- Bettina Bäumer (born 1940), Austrian-born Indian scholar and Indologist
- Angela Zigahl (1885–1955), German teacher and politician
- Peter Voswinckel (born 1951), German physician, medical historian and author
