= René Bouché =

Fashion illustrator (1905–1963)

René Robert Bouché
- Born: Robert August Buchstein; 20 September 1905; Prague, Austro-Hungarian Empire
- Died: 3 July 1963 (aged 57); East Grinstead, England, United Kingdom
- Education: LMU Munich
- Known for: Fashion illustrator

René Robert Bouché (20 September 1905 – 3 July 1963) was an artist and fashion illustrator, known for his work in Vogue magazine between the 1930s and 1960s.

== Life and career ==
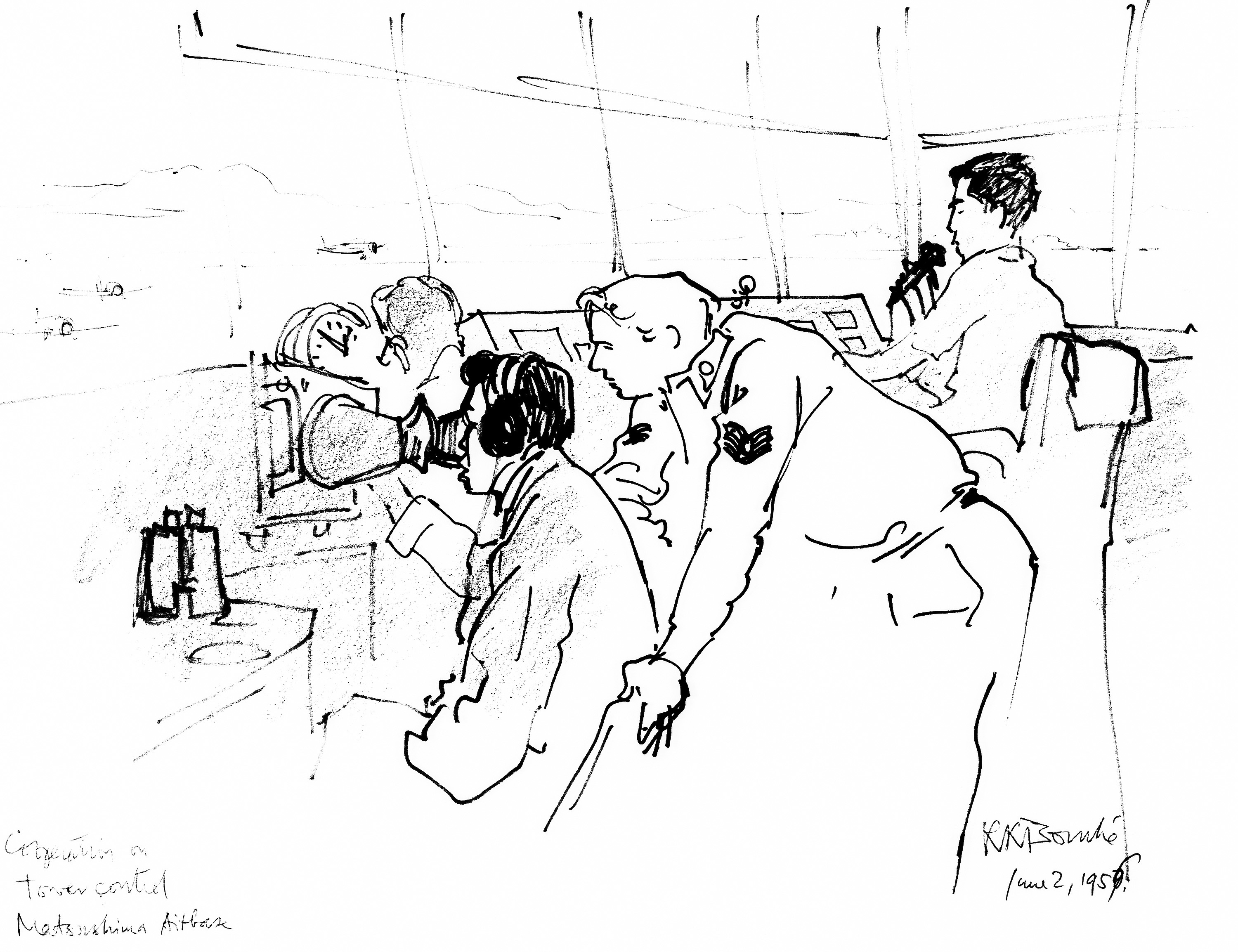
Illustration by Bouché of Matsushima Air Base, Japan

René Bouché was born in Prague on 20 September 1905. He studied at the Ludwig-Maximilians-Universität München (LMU) before moving to Paris. In 1938, he began working for Vogue magazine.

During the Second World War, he immigrated to the United States, settling in Manhattan, where he continued working for Vogue. Bouche painted portraits of many prominent figures including W. H. Auden, Nancy Astor, Truman Capote, Jean Cocteau, Benny Goodman, Aldous Huxley, Edward Kennedy, Jacqueline Kennedy, John F. Kennedy, Willem de Kooning, Sophia Loren, Igor Stravinsky and the Duchess of Windsor. His illustrations were noted for their accuracy and decisiveness.

== Death ==
Bouché died of a heart attack, age 57, in East Grinstead, England.

== See also ==
- List of illustrators
- List of LMU Munich people
- List of people from Prague
