= 2019–20 Bundesliga =

57th season of the Bundesliga

Bundesliga
- Season: 2019–20
- Dates: 16 August 2019 – 27 June 2020
- Champions: Bayern Munich; 29th Bundesliga title 30th German title
- Relegated: Fortuna Düsseldorf; SC Paderborn
- Champions League: Bayern Munich; Borussia Dortmund; RB Leipzig; Borussia Mönchengladbach
- Europa League: Bayer Leverkusen; 1899 Hoffenheim; VfL Wolfsburg
- Matches: 306
- Goals: 982 (3.21 per match)
- Top goalscorer: Robert Lewandowski (34 goals)
- Biggest home win: RB Leipzig 8–0 Mainz (19 November 2019)
- Biggest away win: Hoffenheim 0–6 Bayern Munich (29 February 2020)
- Highest scoring: RB Leipzig 8–0 Mainz (29 February 2020); Augsburg 3–5 Dortmund
- Longest winning run: Bayern Munich; (13 games)
- Longest unbeaten run: Bayern Munich; (20 games)
- Longest winless run: Schalke; (16 games)
- Longest losing run: 5 games Bremen; Hertha BSC; Paderborn; Frankfurt
- Highest attendance: 81,365; Dortmund v Augsburg
- Lowest attendance: Pre-spectatorless matches: (Note: All 83 matches played after 8 March 2020 were played behind closed doors without any spectators.); 14,217; Paderborn v Mainz
- Attendance: 9,116,701 (29,793 per match) (Note: The average league attendance was 40,865 after 223 matches prior to fixtures being played behind closed doors.)

The 2019–20 Bundesliga was the 57th season of the Bundesliga, Germany's premier football competition. It began on 16 August 2019 and concluded on 27 June 2020. Bayern Munich were the defending champions, and won their record-extending 8th consecutive title and 30th title overall (29th in the Bundesliga era) on 16 June with two games to spare. With 100 goals scored in 34 matches, Bayern became the second side to reach this milestone in a Bundesliga season, after the record 101 goals the club previously managed to score in 1971–72.

The number of substitutes allowed on the bench was increased from seven to nine for the 2019–20 season.

On 13 March 2020, the DFL suspended the Bundesliga and 2. Bundesliga due to the COVID-19 pandemic. After consultation with the German government, the league resumed behind closed doors on 16 May 2020. Due to the postponement, the final matchday on 27 June was the second latest date any Bundesliga season has concluded, after the 1971–72 season (which concluded a day later).

== Effects of the COVID-19 pandemic ==
Due to the COVID-19 pandemic in Germany, on 8 March 2020 the Federal Minister of Health, Jens Spahn recommended cancelling events with more than 1,000 people. The following day, the DFL announced that the Bundesliga season would be completed to ensure planning for the following season, and that any postponements would be to matchdays en bloc. On 10 March, it was announced that the catch-up match between Borussia Mönchengladbach and 1. FC Köln on 11 March would be played behind closed doors, the first such occurrence in league history. All fixtures on matchday 26 (13–16 March) were planned to be played without spectators due to local restrictions on public gatherings, but the round was subsequently postponed on 13 March due to safety issues. On 16 March, the DFL General Assembly suspended the league until at least 2 April, and scheduled another meeting for the last week of March to discuss how the competition should proceed. The DFL General Assembly, at their meeting on 31 March, chose to extend the suspension until at least 30 April per the recommendation of the executive committee. At the meeting, the DFL established a sports medicine and special match operations task force responsible for examining a safe method to resume league play.

On 13 March 2020, Luca Kilian of SC Paderborn was the first Bundesliga player to test positive for COVID-19. By 21 March 2020, several clubs, including Eintracht Frankfurt and Hertha BSC, were under quarantine after multiple players and staff had tested positive, and training was made impossible for most others by curfews or the closure of facilities. The DFL looked into possible scenarios to finish the season regularly. However, several virologists raised doubts, stating that any professional football matches in Germany, including those behind closed doors, were unrealistic for at least the next 12 months. In his report for the 31 March DFL meeting, virologist Alexander Kekulé recommended to write off the current season. On 4 April 2020, he clarified that matches behind closed doors were possible in principle, but would require extensive measures, including a total of about 20,000 tests for COVID-19 for the players and staff (testing every player before the start of each game), and an extended quarantine for everyone involved. Kekulé was doubtful though that those measures could be justified at a time when tests for the general population were in short supply.

On 3 April 2020, the DFL reported that the financial situation of most teams was more serious than thought. Of the 36 professional football clubs in the Bundesliga and 2. Bundesliga, 13 would have to declare bankruptcy by May or June unless league operations resumed by then, including four teams from the Bundesliga. Twelve of those clubs had already used the outstanding license fees (which are dependent on the season to be continued) to pay their March debts to creditors. At their 31 March meeting, the DFL had decided that clubs that enter insolvency proceedings this season would not suffer the usual deduction of points, and clubs that enter proceedings next season only lose three instead of the usual nine points.

By 23 April 2020, the DFL had targeted 9 May as a possible resumption date for the Bundesliga. However, this goal suffered a setback when 1. FC Köln announced on 1 May that three people at the club tested positive, without showing any symptoms. This was done as part of a wave of 1,724 tests carried out involving personnel of the 36 Bundesliga and 2. Bundesliga clubs, in coordination with the Federal Ministry of Labour and Social Affairs, which resulted in seven further positive results in addition to those of Köln. After consultation with the German government, chancellor Angela Merkel and the leaders of the states of Germany approved the resumption of the leagues for the second half of May, with matches behind closed doors. The following day, the DFL confirmed that the Bundesliga would resume on 16 May, a Saturday, with matchday 26. The final matchday of the season (round 34), originally scheduled for 16 May, took place on 27 June, making it the second latest date any Bundesliga season has concluded. Only the 1971–72 season finished later (due to UEFA Euro 1972), concluding on 28 June.

The relegation play-offs between Werder Bremen, the 16th-placed team of the Bundesliga, and the 3rd-placed team of the 2. Bundesliga take place as planned. Per the competition regulations, clubs in the Bundesliga and 2. Bundesliga were required to compete in all matches following the restart, even if some players test positive, provided the team has enough healthy players available. On 14 May, after a meeting of all clubs, five substitutions were permitted, which has been temporarily allowed by IFAB following a proposal by FIFA to lessen the impact of fixture congestion. The broadcaster Sky Sport announced that for the first two weeks after the restart, the Bundesliga and 2. Bundesliga simulcast ("conference") would be shown on free-to-air television in Germany, in order to prevent gatherings of people without pay TV subscriptions.

Bundesliga schedule changes
Round	Original dates	Revised dates
26	13–16 March	16–18 May
27	20–22 March	22–24 May
28	3–5 April	26–27 May (midweek)
29	11–13 April	29 May – 1 June
24 (Bremen v Frankfurt catch-up)		3 June
30	17–20 April	5–7 June
31	24–27 April	12–14 June
32	2–4 May	16–17 June (midweek)
33	9 May	20 June
34	16 May	27 June
Relegation play-offs
1st leg	20/21 May	2 July
2nd leg	25/27 May	6 July

== Teams ==
Locations of the 2019–20 Bundesliga teams

A total of 18 teams participated in the 2019–20 edition of the Bundesliga.

=== Team changes ===
Promoted from 2018–19 2. Bundesliga	Relegated from 2018–19 Bundesliga
1. FC Köln; SC Paderborn; Union Berlin	VfB Stuttgart; Hannover 96; 1. FC Nürnberg

Following a victory against VfB Stuttgart on away goals in the relegation/promotion play-offs, Union Berlin were promoted to the Bundesliga for the first time in their history, becoming the 56th club to feature in the Bundesliga, and the first from the former East Berlin.

=== Stadiums and locations ===
Team	Location	Stadium	Capacity	Ref.
FC Augsburg	Augsburg	WWK Arena	30,660	
Hertha BSC	Berlin	Olympiastadion	74,649	
Union Berlin	Berlin	Stadion An der Alten Försterei	22,012	
Werder Bremen	Bremen	Wohninvest Weserstadion	42,100	
Borussia Dortmund	Dortmund	Signal Iduna Park	81,365	
Fortuna Düsseldorf	Düsseldorf	Merkur Spiel-Arena	54,600	
Eintracht Frankfurt	Frankfurt	Commerzbank-Arena	51,500	
SC Freiburg	Freiburg im Breisgau	Schwarzwald-Stadion	24,000	
1899 Hoffenheim	Sinsheim	PreZero Arena	30,150	
1. FC Köln	Cologne	RheinEnergieStadion	49,698	
RB Leipzig	Leipzig	Red Bull Arena	42,558	
Bayer Leverkusen	Leverkusen	BayArena	30,210	
Mainz 05	Mainz	Opel Arena	34,000	
Borussia Mönchengladbach	Mönchengladbach	Borussia-Park	59,724	
Bayern Munich	Munich	Allianz Arena	75,000	
SC Paderborn	Paderborn	Benteler-Arena	15,000	
Schalke 04	Gelsenkirchen	Veltins-Arena	62,271	
VfL Wolfsburg	Wolfsburg	Volkswagen Arena	30,000	

=== Personnel and kits ===
Team	Manager	Captain	Kit manufacturer	Shirt sponsor	
Team	Manager	Captain	Kit manufacturer	Front	Sleeve
FC Augsburg	(Germany) Heiko Herrlich	(Germany) Daniel Baier	Nike	WWK	Siegmund
Hertha BSC	(Germany) Bruno Labbadia	(Bosnia and Herzegovina) Vedad Ibišević	Nike	TEDi	Hyundai Motor Company
Union Berlin	(Switzerland) Urs Fischer	(Austria) Christopher Trimmel	Macron	Aroundtown	ONE Versicherung AG
Werder Bremen	(Germany) Florian Kohfeldt	(Finland) Niklas Moisander	Umbro	Wiesenhof	Tou Tou
Borussia Dortmund	(Switzerland) Lucien Favre	(Germany) Marco Reus	Puma	Evonik	Opel
Fortuna Düsseldorf	(Germany) Uwe Rösler	(Germany) Oliver Fink	Uhlsport	Henkel	Toyo Tires
Eintracht Frankfurt	(Austria) Adi Hütter	(Argentina) David Abraham	Nike	Indeed.com	Deutsche Börse Group
SC Freiburg	(Germany) Christian Streich	(Germany) Mike Frantz	Hummel	Schwarzwaldmilch	Badenova
1899 Hoffenheim	(Germany) Matthias Kaltenbach / (Germany) Marcel Rapp / (Germany) Kai Herdling	(Germany) Benjamin Hübner	Joma	SAP	SNP
1. FC Köln	(Germany) Markus Gisdol	(Germany) Jonas Hector	Uhlsport	REWE	DEVK
RB Leipzig	(Germany) Julian Nagelsmann	(Hungary) Willi Orban	Nike	Red Bull	CG Immobilien
Bayer Leverkusen	(Netherlands) Peter Bosz	(Germany) Lars Bender	Jako	Barmenia Versicherungen	Kieser Training
Mainz 05	(Germany) Achim Beierlorzer	(Germany) Danny Latza	Lotto	Kömmerling	QQ288
Borussia Mönchengladbach	(Germany) Marco Rose	(Germany) Lars Stindl	Puma	Postbank	H-Hotels
Bayern Munich	(Germany) Hansi Flick	(Germany) Manuel Neuer	Adidas	Deutsche Telekom	Qatar Airways
SC Paderborn	(Germany) Steffen Baumgart	(Germany) Christian Strohdiek	Saller	Sunmaker	Effect Energy Drink
Schalke 04	(United States) David Wagner	(Spain) Omar Mascarell	Umbro	Gazprom	DHL
VfL Wolfsburg	(Austria) Oliver Glasner	(France) Josuha Guilavogui	Nike	Volkswagen	Linglong Tire

=== Managerial changes ===
Team	Outgoing	Manner	Exit date		Position in table	Incoming	Incoming date		Ref.
Team	Outgoing	Manner	Announced on	Departed on	Position in table	Incoming	Announced on	Arrived on	Ref.
1899 Hoffenheim	(Germany) Julian Nagelsmann	Signed for RB Leipzig	21 June 2018	30 June 2019	Pre-season	(Netherlands) Alfred Schreuder	19 March 2019	1 July 2019	
RB Leipzig	(Germany) Ralf Rangnick	Appointed as sporting director	9 July 2018	30 June 2019	Pre-season	(Germany) Julian Nagelsmann	21 June 2018	1 July 2019	
VfL Wolfsburg	(Germany) Bruno Labbadia	End of contract	12 March 2019	30 June 2019	Pre-season	(Austria) Oliver Glasner	23 April 2019	1 July 2019	
Schalke 04	(Netherlands) Huub Stevens	End of caretaker spell	14 March 2019	30 June 2019	Pre-season	(United States) David Wagner	9 May 2019	1 July 2019	
Borussia Mönchengladbach	(Germany) Dieter Hecking	Sacked	2 April 2019	30 June 2019	Pre-season	(Germany) Marco Rose	10 April 2019	1 July 2019	
Hertha BSC	(Hungary) Pál Dárdai	Mutual consent	16 April 2019	30 June 2019	Pre-season	(Croatia) Ante Čović	12 May 2019	1 July 2019	
1. FC Köln	(Germany) André Pawlak / (Austria) Manfred Schmid (interim)	End of caretaker spell	27 April 2019	30 June 2019	Pre-season	(Germany) Achim Beierlorzer	13 May 2019	1 July 2019	
Bayern Munich	(Croatia) Niko Kovač	Mutual consent	3 November 2019		4th	(Germany) Hansi Flick (Note: Flick was initially appointed as interim coach, but the move was made permanent on 22 December 2019.)	3 November 2019		
1. FC Köln	(Germany) Achim Beierlorzer	Sacked	9 November 2019		17th	(Germany) Markus Gisdol	18 November 2019		
Mainz 05	(Germany) Sandro Schwarz	Mutual consent	10 November 2019		16th	(Germany) Achim Beierlorzer	18 November 2019		
Hertha BSC	(Croatia) Ante Čović	Mutual consent	27 November 2019		15th	(Germany) Jürgen Klinsmann	27 November 2019		
Fortuna Düsseldorf	(Germany) Friedhelm Funkel	Sacked	29 January 2020		18th	(Germany) Uwe Rösler	29 January 2020		
Hertha BSC	(Germany) Jürgen Klinsmann	Resigned	11 February 2020		14th	(Germany) Alexander Nouri (interim)	11 February 2020		
FC Augsburg	(Switzerland) Martin Schmidt	Sacked	9 March 2020		14th	(Germany) Heiko Herrlich	10 March 2020		
Hertha BSC	(Germany) Alexander Nouri (interim)	End of caretaker spell	9 April 2020		14th	(Germany) Bruno Labbadia	9 April 2020	13 April 2020	
1899 Hoffenheim	(Netherlands) Alfred Schreuder	Mutual consent	9 June 2020		7th	(Germany) Matthias Kaltenbach / (Germany) Marcel Rapp / (Germany) Kai Herdling (interim)	9 June 2020		

== League table ==
Pos	Team	Pld	W	D	L	GF	GA	GD	Pts	Qualification or relegation
1	Bayern Munich (C)	34	26	4	4	100	32	+68	82	Qualification for the Champions League group stage
2	Borussia Dortmund	34	21	6	7	84	41	+43	69	Qualification for the Champions League group stage
3	RB Leipzig	34	18	12	4	81	37	+44	66	Qualification for the Champions League group stage
4	Borussia Mönchengladbach	34	20	5	9	66	40	+26	65	Qualification for the Champions League group stage
5	Bayer Leverkusen	34	19	6	9	61	44	+17	63	Qualification for the Europa League group stage (Note: Since the winners of the 2019–20 DFB-Pokal, Bayern Munich, qualified for the Champions League based on league position, the Europa League group stage spot was passed to the sixth-placed team, and the Europa League second qualifying round spot was passed to the seventh-placed team.)
6	1899 Hoffenheim	34	15	7	12	53	53	0	52	Qualification for the Europa League group stage
7	VfL Wolfsburg	34	13	10	11	48	46	+2	49	Qualification for the Europa League second qualifying round
8	SC Freiburg	34	13	9	12	48	47	+1	48	
9	Eintracht Frankfurt	34	13	6	15	59	60	−1	45	
10	Hertha BSC	34	11	8	15	48	59	−11	41	
11	Union Berlin	34	12	5	17	41	58	−17	41	
12	Schalke 04	34	9	12	13	38	58	−20	39	
13	Mainz 05	34	11	4	19	44	65	−21	37	
14	1. FC Köln	34	10	6	18	51	69	−18	36	
15	FC Augsburg	34	9	9	16	45	63	−18	36	
16	Werder Bremen (O)	34	8	7	19	42	69	−27	31	Qualification for the relegation play-offs
17	Fortuna Düsseldorf (R)	34	6	12	16	36	67	−31	30	Relegation to 2. Bundesliga
18	SC Paderborn (R)	34	4	8	22	37	74	−37	20	Relegation to 2. Bundesliga

Source: DFB
Rules for classification: 1) Points; 2) Goal difference; 3) Goals scored; 4) Head-to-head results; 5) Head-to-head away goals scored; 6) Away goals scored; 7) Play-off.
(C) Champions; (O) Play-off winners; (R) Relegated

== Results ==
Home \ Away	AUG	BSC	UNB	BRE	DOR	DÜS	FRA	FRE	HOF	KÖL	LEI	LEV	MAI	MÖN	MUN	PAD	SCH	WOL
FC Augsburg	—	4–0	1–1	2–1	3–5	3–0	2–1	1–1	1–3	1–1	1–2	0–3	2–1	2–3	2–2	0–0	2–3	1–2
Hertha BSC	2–0	—	4–0	2–2	1–2	3–1	1–4	1–0	2–3	0–5	2–4	2–0	1–3	0–0	0–4	2–1	0–0	0–3
Union Berlin	2–0	1–0	—	1–2	3–1	3–0	1–2	2–0	0–2	2–0	0–4	2–3	1–1	2–0	0–2	1–0	1–1	2–2
Werder Bremen	3–2	1–1	0–2	—	0–2	1–3	0–3	2–2	0–3	6–1	0–3	1–4	0–5	0–0	0–1	0–1	1–2	0–1
Borussia Dortmund	5–1	1–0	5–0	2–2	—	5–0	4–0	1–0	0–4	5–1	3–3	4–0	0–2	1–0	0–1	3–3	4–0	3–0
Fortuna Düsseldorf	1–1	3–3	2–1	0–1	0–1	—	1–1	1–2	2–2	2–0	0–3	1–3	1–0	1–4	0–4	0–0	2–1	1–1
Eintracht Frankfurt	5–0	2–2	1–2	2–2	2–2	2–1	—	3–3	1–0	2–4	2–0	3–0	0–2	1–3	5–1	3–2	2–1	0–2
SC Freiburg	1–1	2–1	3–1	0–1	2–2	0–2	1–0	—	1–0	1–2	2–1	0–1	3–0	1–0	1–3	0–2	4–0	1–0
1899 Hoffenheim	2–4	0–3	4–0	3–2	2–1	1–1	1–2	0–3	—	3–1	0–2	2–1	1–5	0–3	0–6	3–0	2–0	2–3
1. FC Köln	1–1	0–4	1–2	1–0	1–3	2–2	1–1	4–0	1–2	—	2–4	2–0	2–2	0–1	1–4	3–0	3–0	3–1
RB Leipzig	3–1	2–2	3–1	3–0	0–2	2–2	2–1	1–1	3–1	4–1	—	1–1	8–0	2–2	1–1	1–1	1–3	1–1
Bayer Leverkusen	2–0	0–1	2–0	2–2	4–3	3–0	4–0	1–1	0–0	3–1	1–1	—	1–0	1–2	2–4	3–2	2–1	1–4
Mainz 05	0–1	2–1	2–3	3–1	0–4	1–1	2–1	1–2	0–1	3–1	0–5	0–1	—	1–3	1–3	2–0	0–0	0–1
Borussia Mönchengladbach	5–1	2–1	4–1	3–1	1–2	2–1	4–2	4–2	1–1	2–1	1–3	1–3	3–1	—	2–1	2–0	0–0	3–0
Bayern Munich	2–0	2–2	2–1	6–1	4–0	5–0	5–2	3–1	1–2	4–0	0–0	1–2	6–1	2–1	—	3–2	5–0	2–0
SC Paderborn	0–1	1–2	1–1	1–5	1–6	2–0	2–1	1–3	1–1	1–2	2–3	1–4	1–2	1–3	2–3	—	1–5	2–4
Schalke 04	0–3	3–0	2–1	0–1	0–0	3–3	1–0	2–2	1–1	1–1	0–5	1–1	2–1	2–0	0–3	1–1	—	1–4
VfL Wolfsburg	0–0	1–2	1–0	2–3	0–2	1–1	1–2	2–2	1–1	2–1	0–0	0–2	4–0	2–1	0–4	1–1	1–1	—

Source: DFB
Legend: Blue = home team win; Yellow = draw; Red = away team win.

== Relegation play-offs ==
All times are CEST (UTC+2).

=== Overview ===
Team 1	Agg.	Team 2	1st leg	2nd leg
Werder Bremen (B)	2–2 (a)	1. FC Heidenheim (2B)	0–0	2–2

=== Matches ===
2 July 2020
20:30

Werder Bremen	0–0	1. FC Heidenheim
	Report

Weser-Stadion, Bremen
Attendance: 0 (Note: The relegation play-offs were played behind closed doors due to the COVID-19 pandemic in Germany.)
Referee: Felix Zwayer
6 July 2020
20:30

1. FC Heidenheim	2–2	Werder Bremen
Kleindienst 85', 90+7' (pen.)	Report	Theuerkauf 3' (o.g.); Augustinsson 90+4'

Voith-Arena, Heidenheim
Attendance: 0
Referee: Felix Brych

2–2 on aggregate. Werder Bremen won on away goals, and therefore both clubs remained in their respective leagues.

== Statistics ==
=== Top scorers ===
Rank	Player	Club	Goals
1	(Poland) Robert Lewandowski	Bayern Munich	34
2	(Germany) Timo Werner	RB Leipzig	28
3	(England) Jadon Sancho	Borussia Dortmund	17
4	(Netherlands) Wout Weghorst	VfL Wolfsburg	16
5	(Germany) Rouwen Hennings	Fortuna Düsseldorf	15
6	(Colombia) Jhon Córdoba	1. FC Köln	13
6	(Norway) Erling Haaland	Borussia Dortmund	13
6	(Germany) Florian Niederlechner	FC Augsburg	13
6	(Sweden) Robin Quaison	Mainz 05	13
10	(Sweden) Sebastian Andersson	Union Berlin	12
10	(Germany) Serge Gnabry	Bayern Munich	12
10	(Germany) Kai Havertz	Bayer Leverkusen	12
10	(Croatia) Andrej Kramarić	1899 Hoffenheim	12
10	(Portugal) André Silva	Eintracht Frankfurt	12

=== Hat-tricks ===
Player	Club	Against	Result	Date
(Poland) Robert Lewandowski	Bayern Munich	Schalke 04	3–0 (A)	24 August 2019
(Germany) Timo Werner	RB Leipzig	Borussia Mönchengladbach	3–1 (A)	30 August 2019
(Germany) Timo Werner	RB Leipzig	Mainz 05	8–0 (H)	2 November 2019
(Germany) Rouwen Hennings	Fortuna Düsseldorf	Schalke 04	3–3 (A)	9 November 2019
(Brazil) Philippe Coutinho	Bayern Munich	Werder Bremen	6–1 (H)	14 December 2019
(Sweden) Robin Quaison	Mainz 05	Werder Bremen	5–0 (A)	17 December 2019
(Norway) Erling Haaland	Borussia Dortmund	FC Augsburg	5–3 (A)	18 January 2020
(Sweden) Robin Quaison	Mainz 05	Hertha BSC	3–1 (A)	8 February 2020
(Netherlands) Wout Weghorst	VfL Wolfsburg	1899 Hoffenheim	3–2 (A)	15 February 2020
(Germany) Timo Werner	RB Leipzig	Mainz 05	5–0 (A)	24 May 2020
(England) Jadon Sancho	Borussia Dortmund	SC Paderborn	6–1 (A)	31 May 2020
(Croatia) Andrej Kramarić^{4}	1899 Hoffenheim	Borussia Dortmund	4–0 (A)	27 June 2020

^{4} Player scored four goals.

=== Assist providers ===
Rank	Player	Club	Assists
1	(Germany) Thomas Müller	Bayern Munich	21
2	(England) Jadon Sancho	Borussia Dortmund	16
3	(Belgium) Thorgan Hazard	Borussia Dortmund	13
3	(France) Christopher Nkunku	RB Leipzig	13
5	(Serbia) Filip Kostić	Eintracht Frankfurt	11
6	(Germany) Serge Gnabry	Bayern Munich	10
6	(France) Alassane Pléa	Borussia Mönchengladbach	10
6	(Morocco) Achraf Hakimi	Borussia Dortmund	10
9	(Germany) Maximilian Arnold	VfB Wolfsburg	8
9	(France) Marcus Thuram	Borussia Mönchengladbach	8
9	(Germany) Christian Günter	SC Freiburg	8
9	(Italy) Vincenzo Grifo	SC Freiburg	8
9	(Austria) Christopher Trimmel	Union Berlin	8
9	(Germany) Timo Werner	RB Leipzig	8

=== Clean sheets ===
Rank	Player	Club	Clean sheets
1	(Germany) Manuel Neuer	Bayern Munich	15
2	(Switzerland) Roman Bürki	Borussia Dortmund	12
3	(Hungary) Péter Gulácsi	RB Leipzig	10
3	(Finland) Lukáš Hrádecký	Bayer Leverkusen	10
5	(Norway) Rune Jarstein	Hertha BSC	9
6	(Poland) Rafał Gikiewicz	Union Berlin	8
7	(Germany) Oliver Baumann	1899 Hoffenheim	7
7	(Switzerland) Yann Sommer	Borussia Mönchengladbach	7
9	(Germany) Timo Horn	1. FC Köln	6
9	(Germany) Alexander Nübel	Schalke 04	6

== Awards ==
=== Monthly awards ===
Month	Player of the Month		Rookie of the Month		Goal of the Month		Ref.
Month	Player	Club	Player	Club	Player	Club	Ref.
August	(Poland) Robert Lewandowski	Bayern Munich	(England) Jonjoe Kenny	Schalke 04	(Poland) Robert Lewandowski	Bayern Munich	
September	(Morocco) Amine Harit	Schalke 04	(France) Marcus Thuram	Borussia Mönchengladbach	(Netherlands) Javairô Dilrosun	Hertha BSC	
October	(Germany) Serge Gnabry	Bayern Munich	(France) Marcus Thuram	Borussia Mönchengladbach	(Sweden) Robin Quaison	Mainz 05	
November	(Germany) Timo Werner	RB Leipzig	(France) Marcus Thuram	Borussia Mönchengladbach	(Denmark) Robert Skov	1899 Hoffenheim	
December	(Germany) Timo Werner	RB Leipzig	(Germany) Ismail Jakobs	1. FC Köln	(Brazil) Philippe Coutinho	Bayern Munich	
January	(Norway) Erling Haaland	Borussia Dortmund	(Norway) Erling Haaland	Borussia Dortmund	(Germany) Florian Neuhaus	Borussia Mönchengladbach	
February	(England) Jadon Sancho	Borussia Dortmund	(Norway) Erling Haaland	Borussia Dortmund	(Germany) Emre Can	Borussia Dortmund	
March	—N/a		—N/a		(Belgium) Thorgan Hazard	Borussia Dortmund	
May	(Germany) Kai Havertz	Bayer Leverkusen	(Canada) Alphonso Davies	Bayern Munich	(Germany) Joshua Kimmich	Bayern Munich	
June	—N/a		—N/a		(Portugal) André Silva	Eintracht Frankfurt	

=== Annual awards ===
Award	Winner	Club	Ref.
Player of the Season	(Poland) Robert Lewandowski	Bayern Munich	
Rookie of the Season	(Canada) Alphonso Davies	Bayern Munich	
Goal of the Season	(Germany) Emre Can	Borussia Dortmund	

Team of the Season
Goalkeeper	(Switzerland) Yann Sommer (Borussia Mönchengladbach)			
Defenders	(Morocco) Achraf Hakimi (Borussia Dortmund)		(Germany) Joshua Kimmich (Bayern Munich)	(Germany) Christian Günter (Freiburg)
Midfielders	(England) Jadon Sancho (Borussia Dortmund)	(Austria) Marcel Sabitzer (RB Leipzig)	(Germany) Serge Gnabry (Bayern Munich)	(Serbia) Filip Kostić (Eintracht Frankfurt)
Forwards	(Germany) Thomas Müller (Bayern Munich)		(Poland) Robert Lewandowski (Bayern Munich)	(Germany) Timo Werner (RB Leipzig)
