= André Lacroix =

André Lacroix is the name of:

- André Lacroix (businessman) (born 1960), French businessman
- André Lacroix (ice hockey) (1945–2026), Canadian ice hockey player
- André Lacroix (tennis) (1908–1992), Belgian tennis player
- André Lacroix (pentathlete) (1921–2016), French pentathlete
