= Dassler =

Dassler is a surname. Notable people with the surname include:

- Adolf Dassler (1900–1978), German cobbler and founder of German sportswear company Adidas
- Armin Dassler (1929–1990), CEO of sportswear company Puma and son of Rudolf Dassler
- Britta Katharina Dassler (born 1964), German politician
- Horst Dassler (1936–1987), chairman of sportswear company Adidas and son of Adolf Dassler
- Jonas Dassler (born 1996), German stage and film actor
- Rudolf Dassler (1898–1974), founder of German sportswear company Puma and brother of Adolf Dassler
- Stefan Dassler (born 1962), German author of non-fiction books
- Uwe Dassler (born 1967, Uwe Daßler in German), German free-style swimmer

== See also ==
- Dessler, a surname
