= Roderich D. Süssmuth =

German chemist (born 1971)

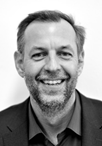
- Süssmuth in 2020
- Born: March 6, 1971 (age 55)
- Education: Eberhard Karls University of Tübingen
- Scientific career
- Workplaces: TU Berlin

Roderich D. Süssmuth (born March 6, 1971 in Tübingen) is a German chemist and biochemist.

== Life ==
Roderich Süssmuth studied chemistry and biochemistry at the Eberhard Karls University of Tübingen from 1990 to 1996. In 1999, he received his doctorate under Günther Jung in Tübingen with a dissertation entitled Isolation, structural elucidation, and synthesis of microbial metabolites from Amycolatopsis mediterranei, Staphylococcus epidermidis, and Streptomyces lividans.

During a postdoctoral stay at the Scripps Research Institute in La Jolla, California, United States, from 2000 to 2001, he worked with Richard A. Lerner and Carlos F. Barbas on catalytic antibodies and organocatalysis. As an Emmy Noether Research Fellow (DFG) from 2001 to 2004, he completed his habilitation in chemistry and biochemistry at the University of Tübingen.

In 2004, he was appointed Associate Professor of Biological Chemistry at TU Berlin. In 2008, he was appointed to the Rudolf Wiechert Professorship of Biological Chemistry at TU Berlin.

In 2020, he was named a Fellow of the Royal Society of Chemistry (FRSC) and an honorary member of the Israel Chemical Society.

In 2022, he was admitted to the Confraternity of Santa Maria dell'Anima in Rome.

== Work ==
During his career, Roderich Süssmuth worked in the field of peptide synthesis, addressing current research questions from both a chemical perspective (natural product synthesis) and a biological perspective, particularly with regard to new classes of active compounds with activity against fungi, bacteria, and viruses. Compounds derived from plant-pathogenic bacteria such as Xanthomonas albilineans play an important role, including albicidin, which is an inhibitor of plant gyrase and also a highly potent antibacterial agent.

He elucidated the structure of the antibacterial compound albicidin, investigated its biosynthesis, developed the total synthesis of the peptide, and studied a range of bacterial resistance factors, mostly from plant-associated bacteria. Another example is the recent elucidation of a lipopeptide from Burkholderia sp., which exhibits pronounced activity against plant-pathogenic fungi. Another area of research involves fungal toxins of the death cap mushroom, phalloidin and amanitin, for which total syntheses were developed and, with the ansamer concept, a novel non-classical atropisomerism was described.

== Awards ==
- 2000: Feodor Lynen Fellowship of the Alexander von Humboldt Foundation
- 2002: Emmy Noether Fellowship of the German Research Foundation (DFG)
- 2002: Friedrich Weygand Prize of the Max Bergmann Circle e.V.
- 2003: Young Scientist Award for Natural Product Research of DECHEMA e.V.
- 2003: Eli Lilly Lecture Award
- 2006: Lecturer Fellowship from the German Chemical Industry Association (VCI)
- 2010: Sigma Aldrich Lecture, Lunteren, Netherlands
- 2013: Visiting Professorship at Ben Gurion University of the Negev, Israel
- 2014: Van Arkel Chair at Leiden University, Netherlands
- 2020: Recipient of the Max Bergmann Medal for outstanding achievements in the field of peptide natural products

== Select publications ==
- Meindl, Kathrin; Schmiederer, Timo; Schneider, Kathrin; Reicke, Andreas; Butz, Diane; Keller, Simone; et al. (February 2010). "Labyrinthopeptine – eine neue Klasse carbacyclischer Lantibiotika". Angewandte Chemie (in German). 122 (6): 1169–1173. doi:10.1002/ange.200905773.
- Schadt, Heiko S.; Schadt, Simone; Oldach, Florian; Süssmuth, Roderich D. (February 18, 2009). "2-Amino-2-deoxyisochorismate Is a Key Intermediate in Bacillus subtilis p-Aminobenzoic Acid Biosynthesis". Journal of the American Chemical Society. 131 (10). doi:10.1021/ja809283u.
- Dettner, Frank; Hänchen, Anne; Schols, Dominique; Toti, Luigi; Nußer, Antje; Süssmuth, Roderich D. (February 2009). "Totalsynthese des antiviralen Peptidantibiotikums Feglymycin". Angewandte Chemie (in German). 121 (10): 1888–1893. doi:10.1002/ange.200804130.
- Bister, Bojan; Bischoff, Daniel; Ströbele, Markus; Riedlinger, Julia; Reicke, Andreas; Wolter, Falko; et al. (May 2004). "Abyssomicin C—A Polycyclic Antibiotic from a Marine Verrucosispora Strain as an Inhibitor of the p ‐Aminobenzoic Acid/Tetrahydrofolate Biosynthesis Pathway". Angewandte Chemie International Edition. 43 (19): 2574–2576. doi:10.1002/anie.200353160.
- Bister, Bojan; Bischoff, Daniel; Nicholson, Graeme J.; Valdebenito, Marianne; Schneider, Kathrin; Winkelmann, Günther; et al. (August 2004). "The structure of salmochelins: C-glucosylated enterobactins of Salmonella enterica §". Biometals. 17 (4): 471–481. doi:10.1023/B:BIOM.0000029432.69418.6a.
