= Dessler =

Dessler is a surname. Notable people with the surname include:

- Alexander Dessler (born 1928), American space scientist
- Andrew Dessler (born 1964), American climate scientist
- Eliyahu Eliezer Dessler (1892–1953), Belorussion-British Orthodox Jewish rabbi, Talmudic scholar and philosopher (son of Reuven Dov)
- Michelle Dessler, fictional character in American television series 24
- Nachum Zev Dessler (1921–2011), American Orthodox Jewish rabbi, founder of the Hebrew Academy of Cleveland
- Reuven Dov Dessler (1863–1935), Latvian Jewish leader of the Musar movement

== See also ==
- Dassler, a surname
