= SAI360 =

American business services company

SAI360, formerly SAI Global, is a multinational business services company based in Chicago, Illinois, United States. It offers risk management services, quality assurance audit and certification, auditor training, standards information services, and property services.

== History ==
SAI Global was established in 2003 when Standards Australia sold its commercial business. On 17 December 2003, SAI Global was floated on the Australian Securities Exchange (ASX) with Standards Australia retaining a 40% shareholding that was then progressively sold down to zero. In 2016, Baring Private Equity Asia acquired SAI Global Group with it delisted from the ASX.

In May 2021, SAI360 sold its Global Standards and Assurance practice to Intertek Group for A$855 million.
