= Moody International =

British technical services company

Moody International Ltd.
- Industry: Technical services
- Founded: 1911; 115 years ago
- Defunct: April 28, 2011; 15 years ago
- Fate: Acquired by Intertek in 2011
- Headquarters: Haywards Heath, United Kingdom

Moody International Ltd. provided technical services to reduce risk in the petroleum industry, amongst others.

On April 28, 2011, the company was acquired by Intertek for £450 million. At that time, the company had over 2,500 employees and 80 offices in 60 countries.

== History ==
The company was founded in the United States in 1911.

In 1948, the company opened an office in Japan, its first international office.

The company opened an office in United Arab Emirates, its first office in the Middle East, in 1986. It opened offices in China in 1993 and Baku in 1996.

In 2007, the company was acquired by Investcorp of Bahrain for £192 million.

On April 28, 2011, the company was acquired by Intertek for £450 million.
