= Standards Australia =

National standards body for Australia

Standards Australia Limited
- Trade name: Standards Australia
- Formerly: Australian Commonwealth Engineering Standards Association; Standards Association of Australia; Standards Australia International Limited (SAI Limited)
- Company type: Not-for-profit public company limited by guarantee
- Industry: technical standards
- Founded: 1922; 104 years ago
- Headquarters: The Exchange Centre, Sydney, Australia
- Brands: Australian Standards
- Revenue: ▲ A$53,737,000 (2024); A$49,106,000 (2023)
- Net income: ▼ A$−8,297,000 (2024); A$1,002,000 (2023)
- Total assets: ▼ A$373,680,000 (2024); A$380,328,000 (2023)
- Total equity: ▼ A$341,035,000 (2024); A$349,332,000 (2023)
- Members: 84 member organisations (2024)
- Number of employees: 292 (2024)
- Website: standards.org.au

Standards Australia is the peak standards organisation of Australia. It develops, maintains and distributes Australian Standards, its brand of internationally-aligned technical standards, as well as their associated publications. It also provides standards accreditation services and represents Australia in international standards development.

Standards Australia is Australia's representative on the International Organization for Standardization (ISO), the International Electrotechnical Commission (IEC) and the Pacific Area Standards Congress (PASC). As of 2025, Standards Australia has 85 members representing groups interested in the development and application of technical standards and related products and services.

== History ==
Standards Australia was established in 1922 as the Australian Commonwealth Engineering Standards Association. It was renamed the Standards Association of Australia in 1929, and was a founding member of the International Organization for Standardization (ISO) in 1947.

The association received a royal charter in 1950 and incorporated under it the following year. In 1988, the organisation was renamed Standards Australia and signed a memorandum of understanding with the Australian government to formally recognise Standards Australia as the primary non-government standards development body in Australia.

In 1999, it incorporated as a public company limited by guarantee under the name Standards Australia International Limited (SAI Limited). In 2003, Standards Australia sold its commercial business to a separate, newly-formed company SAI Global floated on the Australian Securities Exchange.

== Australian Standards ==
Australian Standards are technical standards which cover a broad range of subjects and industries. The standards may outline product specifications, engineering and building design, codes of practice for delivering services, safety standards, test methods or management systems. The standards are widely recognised by Australian industry and the community as trusted and authoritative benchmarks of acceptable and best practice.

The standards are internationally recognised and aligned. Standards Australia works with Standards New Zealand to develop joint Australian/New Zealand standards (AS/NZS), and has a policy to adopt ISO and IEC standards as Australian or joint Australian/New Zealand standards wherever possible.

Australian Standards are identified with the prefix AS, for example AS 2601:2025 The demolition of structures. Joint Australian/New Zealand standards are identified with AS/NZS, for example AS/NZS 3016:2002 Electrical installations — Electric security fences. Where an international standard has been adopted in Australia, it is also identified with the international organisation and is often assigned the same number as the international standard, for example AS/NZS ISO 3602:2025 Documentation - Romanization of Japanese (kana script), which identically adopts ISO 3602:1989.

Standards Australia does not have a role in monitoring or enforcing standards, and the published standards alone are voluntary. However, governments in Australia widely refer to Australian Standards in legislation and regulations, making them mandatory in those settings. Some standards are developed specifically for adoption in legislation.

== Distribution and sale of standards ==
When Standard Australia sold its commercial arm to SAI Global in 2003, it granted SAI Global an exclusive licence to publish and distribute Australian Standards. Standards Australia initially retained a 40% interest in SAI Global, but progressively sold this shareholding down to zero to focus more exclusively on the development and maintenance of standards and representing Australia's interests in international standardisation. In 2016, SAI Global was acquired by Baring Private Equity Asia and delisted from the ASX.

The price of technical standards in Australia has been seen by some industry observers to be at cross-purposes with the implicit objectives of Standards Australia as a non-profit organisation, and inconsistent with the initial creation of the intellectual property for their standards using industry volunteer labour. Standards for the construction of buildings were reported to cost an average of A$120 in 2017, and the National Construction Code directly or indirectly referenced several hundred such standards. A 2018 analysis of the price of a standards document (ISO 45001) to an end user showed that 40% was ascribed to the cost of sending the PDF document, 54% was a royalty payable to the distributor (SAI Global), and 6% was a royalty to the IP owner (Standards Australia).

The publishing agreement held by SAI Global was due to expire in 2018, and the imminent release of the new AS/NZS 3000:2018 Electrical installations standard sparked a renewed campaign for a change of the licensing model.

In 2019, the exclusive licence held by SAI Global expired. Australian Standards are now available from multiple distributors, including Standards Australia's own online storefront.

=== Public access to standards ===
After negotiations broke down with National and State Libraries Australia in 2016, Australian Standards ceased to be accessible from the nine libraries that had offered public access to the standards by paying an annual fee of A$14,000 per library. As a result, in 2018 several groups including the Building Products Innovation Council, the Master Builders Association, an Australian Senate Economics Reference Committee and the consumer advocacy organisation Choice called for publication rights to be brought under government control and for standards to become freely accessible. Several groups advocated that a national standard should be provided free of charge to the relevant members of the industry.

Standards Australia now provides limited free online access to standards for personal, non-commercial use, limited to three standards per calendar year. Some public, state and university libraries also offer free access to selected standards.

== Public and industry comment on standards ==
Standards Australia allows comments to be made on draft standards. It also provides a mechanism to identify and record difficulties in the application of standards that are currently in force or internal inconsistencies within those standards through their proposal portal.

== Examples of notable standards ==
- AS/NZS 1170 Structural design actions
- AS/NZS 1768 Lightning protection
- AS 1851 Routine service of fire protection systems and equipment
- AS/NZS 2053 Conduits and fittings for electrical installations
- AS/NZS 3000 Electrical installations (known as the Australian/New Zealand Wiring Rules)
- AS/NZS 3112 Plug and socket outlets
- AS/NZS 3500 Plumbing and drainage Set
- AS/NZS 3788 Pressure equipment – In-service inspection
- AS 3959 Construction of Buildings in Bushfire Prone Areas
- AS/NZS 4490 Verification of timber properties using in-grade testing methods, including approaches such as biased position testing for structural softwood
- AS/NZS 5033 Installation and safety requirements for photovoltaic (PV) arrays
- AS/NZS ISO 31000 Risk management – Principles and guidelines
