= Gisela Bulla =

German archaeologist, author and politician (1932-2018)

- Born: Gisela Elisabeth Gottschalk; 6 March 1932; Hamburg, Germany
- Died: 3 October 2018 (aged 86); Munich, Bavaria, Germany
- Occupations: archeologist, author, and politician
- Political party: Human Environment Animal Protection Party

Gisela Elisabeth Bulla (born Gottschalk, 6 March 1932 – 3 October 2018) was a German archaeologist, author, and politician. She authored several books on the subject of domestic animals. From March 1995 to September 2000, she was also the federal chairwoman of the Human Environment Animal Protection Party.

== Biography ==
From the age of six, Bulla lived in Munich. She received her PhD in classical archaeology from the Ludwig-Maximilians-Universität München in 1972 with a dissertation entitled Typologische Darstellung griechischer Innenhofhäuser. She worked as a publishing editor until 1976. Since then she has been a freelance author. Under her birth name she wrote popular books on the pharaohs, the Roman emperors and the emperors of China. She has also written a number of books on pets, focusing on cats and rats and animal abuse. In 1984, she co-authored Endzeit für Tiere with Sina Walden, a book which gained some notoriety in animal rights circles. She also wrote articles for magazines such as Emma. She was married and lived in Munich and Malta.

== Political engagement ==
Bulla had already been living a vegetarian lifestyle since the 1970s. In the 1990s, she joined the Animal Protection Party, which was founded in 1993. At the third federal party conference, held in Braunschweig on 11 March 1995, she was elected federal chairwoman, succeeding Ingeborg Bingener. She was confirmed in office in both 1997 and 1998. For the 1998 German federal election, Bulla was unanimously elected as the top candidate.

In the 1999 European Parliament election in Germany, she was also the top candidate for her party. With an election result of 0.7% in the European election, the Animal Protection Party participated in state party funding for the first time. She was last re-elected as party chair in January 1999. She rejected electoral alliances with other parties during her tenure, so as not to dilute the idea of animal protection.

On 8 September 2000, one day before the eighth federal party conference in Berlin, she resigned from this position, as she was elected deputy chairwoman of the party's Federal Arbitration Court the following day. First Deputy Federal chairman Egon Karp then took over as acting leader of the party for a year, before Jürgen Gerlach was elected to succeed her as party chairman on 29 September 2001.

== Works ==
- Bulla, Gisela (1996). Die Katze, das rätselhafte Wesen : richtig verstehen, gesund ernähren, artgerecht halten. Augsburg: Bechtermünz. ISBN 3-86047-407-3. OCLC 164924871.
- Bulla, Gisela (1980). Katzen Katzenrassen, Katzenhaltung u. Katzenerziehung, Pflege, Ernährung, Krankheiten (Orig.-Ausg ed.). München. ISBN 978-3-453-41344-3. OCLC 643807109.
- Rucksack und Wanderschuh: 1000 Tips für Wanderfreunde (in German), München: Heyne, 1985, ISBN 3-453-416449
- Die kluge Ratte: Porträt eines Außenseiters (in German), Reinbek: Wunderlich Verlag, 1986, ISBN 3-8052-0424-8
- Katzenkorb und Vogelkäfig: 1000 Tips für den richtigen Umgang mit Haustieren (in German), München: Heyne, 1986, ISBN 3-453-41544-2
- Katzenlexikon: Von A wie Anschleichen bis Z wie Zauberkatzen (in German), Reinbek: Rowohlt Verlag, 1986, ISBN 9-783-49960547-5
- Bulla, Gisela (1998). Katzen-Lexikon : von A wie Anschleichen bis Z wie Zauberkatzen. Reinbek bei Hamburg: Rowohlt. ISBN 3-499-60547-3. OCLC 46731653.
- Walden, Sina (1992). Endzeit für Tiere ein Aufruf zu ihrer Befreiung. Gisela Bulla (Überarb. und erw. Neuausg ed.). Reinbek bei Hamburg. ISBN 978-3-499-19310-1. OCLC 75319899.
- Meine Katze: Richtig verstehen, gesund ernähren, artgerecht halten (in German), Augsburg: Naturbuch Verlag, 1993, ISBN 9-783-89440108-5
- Meine Katze richtig verstehen, gesund ernähren, artgerecht halten. Gisela Bulla, Karin Skogstad. Augsburg. 1993. ISBN 978-3-89440-108-5. OCLC 75342512.
- Natürliche Heilung durch Aromatherapie: Alte und neue Rezepte für Gesundheit und Wohlgefühl. Natürliche Duftstoffe gegen Magenschwerden, Kopfschmerzen und Schlafstörungen (in German), München: Südwest Verlag, 1996, ISBN 9-783-51701743-3
- Bulla, Gisela (1994). Ratten als Heimtiere richtig pflegen und verstehen Experten-Rat für die artgerechte Haltung; auch für Kinder, die ihr Tier selbst versorgen (5. Aufl., inhaltl. unveränd. Ausg. der 2. Aufl ed.). München. ISBN 978-3-7742-1258-9. OCLC 75479949.
- Die Katze, das rätselhafte Wesen: Richtig verstehen, gesund ernähren, artgerecht halten (in German), Augsburg: Bechtermünz Verlag, 1999, ISBN 3-86047-407-3
- Ratten (in German), München: Gräfe & Unzer, 2002, ISBN 3-7742-3699-2
- Im Reich der Bastet: Roman (in German), Frankfurt am Main: Fouqué, 2003, ISBN 3-8267-5349-6

Publication under the pseudonym of Nelly Hamilton

- Der Fluch des Ägypters, Vampir Taschenbuch (in German), Rastatt: Pabel, 1977

Publication under the name of Gisela Gottschalk

- Die großen Pharaonen: Ihr Leben – ihre Zeit – ihre Kunstwerke (in German), Bern: Scherz, 1979, ISBN 3-89350-078-2
- Die großen Cäsaren: Ihr Leben – ihre Taten – ihre Zeit (in German), Bern: Scherz, 1979, ISBN 3-88199-154-9
- Chinas große Kaiser: Ihre Geschichte – ihre Kultur – ihre Leistungen. Die chinesischen Herrscherdynastien in Bildern, Berichten und Dokumenten (in German), Herrsching am Ammersee: Pawlak, 1985, ISBN 3-88199-229-4
