= Alexander Kekulé =

German virologist

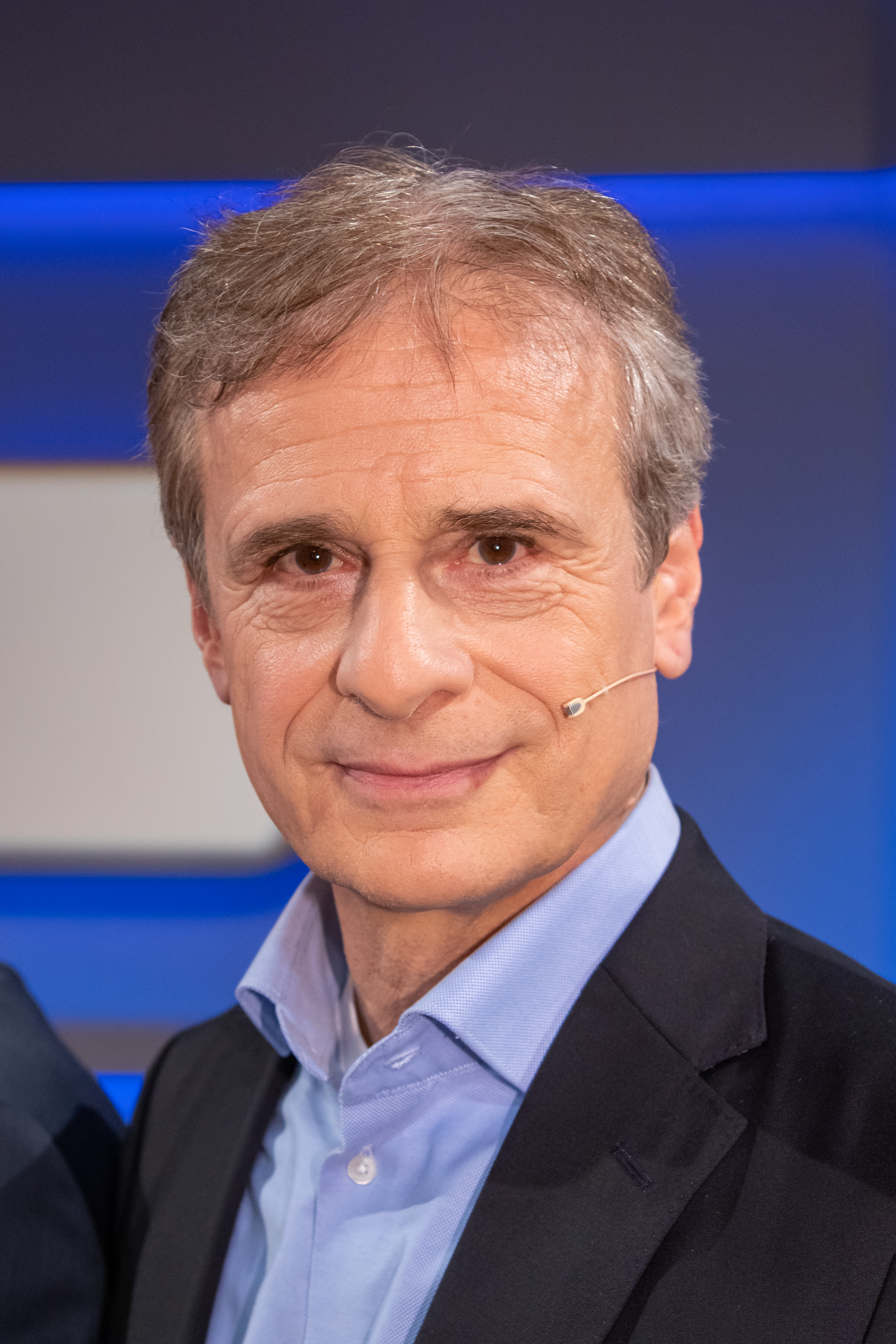
- Kekulé in 2020
- Born: November 7, 1958 (age 68); Munich

Alexander S. Kekulé (born November 7, 1958) is a German physician and biochemist. Since 1999 he has held the chair for Medical Microbiology and Virology of the Martin Luther University of Halle-Wittenberg and Director of the Institute for Medical Microbiology of the Universitätsklinikum Halle (University Hospital Halle).

== Life ==
Kekulé is the son of the author Dagmar Kekulé. He attended the Waldorf School and the Rupprecht-Gymnasium in Munich, where he received his Abitur in 1979. He studied philosophy, biochemistry and human medicine at the Free University of Berlin and at LMU Munich until 1987. In 1988, he worked as an associate for the management consultancy McKinsey & Company in New York City (USA). From 1988 to 1993 he conducted research with Peter Hans Hofschneider at the Max Planck Institute for Biochemistry in Martinsried (Bavaria). He received 1990 his PhD in biochemistry from the Free University of Berlin and in 1992 in medicine at LMU Munich. In 1993, he obtained his habilitation degree in Medical Microbiology / Virology at the Technical University of Munich. From 1993 to 1994 he spent one year as an assistant in internal medicine in the hospital of Barmherzigen Brüder in Munich. From 1994 to 1996 he worked at the Max von Pettenkofer-Institut at LMU Munich.

Kekulé is Specialist in microbiology, virology and infection epidemiology and specialist in Laboratory medicine. From 1997 to 1998 he was deputy head of the Institute for Virology at Eberhard-Karls-Universität Tübingen. In 1999, he accepted a professorship in medical microbiology and virology at the Martin Luther University of Halle-Wittenberg. He was suspended because of falling short of this teaching load by Martin Luther University of Halle-Wittenberg shortly before Christmas in 2021.

Kekulé is married, has five children, and lives in Munich.

In 1968, Kekulé had the leading role in the film "Bübchen" by Roland Klick as a child actor under the actor name "Sascha Urchs".

== Research areas ==
Kekulé's research focuses on infectious disease, biological civil protection and bioethics. In 1992, in search of the molecular causes of liver cancer, he and his research group were able to show that the X gene of the hepatitis B virus activates a signaling cascade in the liver cell that is also responsible for the development of cancer Chemicals is responsible. Furthermore, with his working group he discovered the preS / S transactivator, a novel regulator gene of hepatitis -B virus. Another focus of his work is the influenza – pandemic.

== Honors and awards ==
Kekulé was awarded the Hans Popper Award for Basic Research of the International Association for the Study of the Liver (1992) and the Karl Heinrich Bauer Memorial Prize for Cancer Research (1990) for his work in the field of cancer production by viruses. He also received the Doctoral Dissertation Prize of the German Society for Hygiene and Microbiology. (1991), the prize awarded by the Verband der Chemischen Industrie (1991) and the Journalism Prize of SmithKline Beecham Foundation (1997). He was a scholarship holder of the German National Academic Foundation as well as Bavarian state winner of the competition Jugend forscht, at that time still under the name Alexander Urchs. Kekulé was a member of the Schutzkommission beim Bundesministerium des Innern and has been a member of the Arzneimittelkommission der deutschen Ärzteschaft as well as the selection committee of the Studienstiftung des deutschen Volkes. From 1990 to 2004 he was a member of the commission Teaching and Further Education of the Society for Virology.

== Journalistic activity ==
Besides his scientific work, Kekulé publishes on social and ethical aspects of the natural sciences. His articles have appeared in the weekly newspaper Die Zeit, the magazine Der Spiegel, the daily newspaper Neue Zürcher Zeitung and the weekly newspaper Jüdische Allgemeine. Since 1999, he has been writing the column "Was Wissen schafft" (What knowledge creates) in the daily newspaper Der Tagesspiegel.

In 2001 Kekulé pleaded for the establishment of a global fund for the fight against AIDS in the Third World and advocates a "human right to natural genetic material".

The Database Scopus calculates (as of April 2020) from 32 scientific publications with a total of 1170 recorded citations a h-index of 14.

== COVID-19 pandemic ==
The Mitteldeutscher Rundfunk produces the Podcast Kekulé's Corona Compass on weekdays.

In the context of the COVID-19 pandemic, Kekulé expressed publicly on several occasions that Germany was not sufficiently prepared for a possible epidemic. While he initially thought that the virus did not pose a major threat, he later called for much stricter measures to combat the epidemic, such as interventions at German airports. With the beginning of the epidemic in Germany, Kekulé emphatically advocated his demand for two-week "corona holidays" for schools and kindergartens, which was implemented from Monday, March 16, 2020. Major events should all be cancelled and domestic travel within Germany should be reduced to a minimum. He also warned against "super horror scenarios" regarding the spread of COVID-19 in Germany.

On April 11, 2020, The Daily Telegraph quoted Kekulé as saying that the German people should "infect the young and isolate those at risk". He said that the lockdown is "in danger of going on too long and causing more damage than the virus". He was interviewed and said that:

It's impossible to wait for a vaccine... If we did that our society and our culture would be ruined.

== Publications ==
- "protection of the population from newly appearing Influenzaviren. " Report of the protective commission, in 2006.
- "highly pathogenic causes and biological agents." MiQ – high-class standards in the microbiological infektiologischen diagnostics (4 volumes), in 2008, ISBN 978-3-437-22627-4, ISBN 978-3-437-22637-3, ISBN 978-3-437-22628-1, ISBN 978-3-437-22638-0.
- "bio-death at 45 minutes? – Facts and fictions to the Iraqi bioweapon programme." In: Bernd W. Kubbig (Ed.): "Source of fire Iraq." Campus, Frankfurt am Main 2003, ISBN 3-593-37284-3, page 44–49.
