= Rolf Issels =

German medical doctor

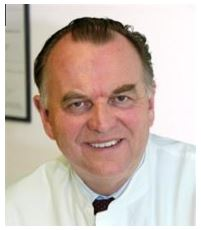
Rolf Issels

Rolf Issels (born 25 April 1948 in Mönchengladbach, Germany) is a medical oncologist and biochemist. He performed the first regional hyperthermia in combination with chemotherapy in 1986.

== Education and career ==
Issels studied human medicine at LMU Munich and biochemistry at the University of Tübingen. He received his doctorate degree in human medicine in 1977. In 1980, he received his diploma in biochemistry.

In 1978, he began working as a research assistant at the Medical Clinic III at the Großhadern Clinic of LMU Munich, with a focus on haematology and oncology.

With a scholarship from the German Cancer Aid (1982–83), Issels began experimental studies on sarcoma cells and heat shock as a Research Fellow of the Harvard Medical School. He worked at the Massachusetts General Hospital in Boston.

In 1990, Issels became a senior physician at LMU's Medical Clinic III. In 1996, he was appointed professor. In 2010, he took over as head of the newly founded Sarcoma Center (SarKUM) at the LMU.

== Achievements ==
On July 10, 1986, Issels performed the world's first regional hyperthermia with systemic chemotherapy without complications on a 36-year-old female patient with extensive pelvic sarcoma at the Großhadern Hospital. From July 1986 to July 1989, a tumour response rate of 37% was achieved in a phase II study in a total of 40 therapy-resistant sarcoma patients, whereby the temperature measured in the tumour significantly distinguished the responders from the non-responders. For the publication of these results in the Journal of Clinical Oncology, Issels was awarded the annual German Cancer Prize of the German Cancer Society in 1991.

The subsequent randomised, multicentre phase III EORTC-ESHO 95 study in Europe of 341 high-risk soft tissue sarcomas showed a significant survival benefit for patients who received a combination of regional hyperthermia with chemotherapy before and after surgery. The results led to the inclusion of regional hyperthermia in the treatment guidelines for sarcomas and to reimbursement of treatment costs by health insurance companies. The analyses of the immune infiltrates in the patients showed a significant increase in tumour-infiltrating immune cells with simultaneous suppression of immunosuppressive factors.

In addition to his clinical research, Issels has been involved in biochemical studies on the induction of heat shock proteins since 1982 and, since 1992, in the immunological significance of stress proteins for the immune response against cancer in a research group funded by the German Research Foundation (DFG).

In 2018, Issels was appointed Senior Consultant by Michael von Bergwelt, Head of the Department of Internal Medicine III.

== Awards ==
- 1991: German Cancer Award of the German Cancer Society
- 2003: ESHO Award (European Society for Hyperthermic Oncology)
- 2010: Science Award of the Working Group of Internal Oncology for the clinical part
- 2014: J. Eugene Robinson Award of the American Society for Thermal Medicine (STM)
- 2019: Elected as a member of the Cell Stress Society International (CSSI)
- 2021: George M. Hahn Award of the American Society for Thermal Medicine (STM)
