= André Lacroix (businessman) =

French businessman (born 1960)

André Lacroix (born 1960) is a French businessman who, from 16 May 2015, is chief executive of the FTSE 100 multinational company Intertek Group plc.

Lacroix began his career as an external auditor with Ernst and Young in 1983. He was president of Burger King International between 1996 and 2003, before becoming chairman and CEO of Euro Disney SCA, the company that owns and operates Disneyland Paris. He held that post until May 2005 and then from January 2006 to March 2015 was the group chief executive of Inchcape plc, a British multinational automotive retail and services company.

Lacroix is a graduate of ESCP Europe, a French-European business school.
