= Michael Haussner =

German lawyer and political civil servant

Michael Haußner (born 16 June 1954 in Augsburg) is a German lawyer and political civil servant. He held the position of Secretary of State at the Thuringia Ministry of Justice.

== Professional life ==
Haußner went to school in Augsburg and Munich and obtained his Abitur at the Maximiliansgymnasium in Munich in 1973. After having done his military service he studied law at LMU Munich between 1975 and 1980. He took the first and second state examination in July 1980 and May 1983 respectively. After first having worked as an assistant at his alma mater, he took a position as an exchange assistant at Fukuoka University, Japan.

In 1984, he was appointed Judge of Probation in Munich. The appointment as Prosecutor followed two years later, in 1986. After having worked as a teacher at the Bavarian vocational university for civil servants at Starnberg (1988–1991), Haußner was appointed judge at the county court in Munich. In 1994, he became a prosecutor at the same court. Two years later, in 1996, he was seconded to the Public Prosecution Office in Erfurt, Thuringia. In 1998, Haußner was seconded a second time, this time for judiciary and European affairs to the Thuringia Ministry of Justice. After returning to his position as a judge at the county court in Munich, he was appointed judge at the provincial high court and court of appeal in Munich in 2002. The appointment as Attorney General of Thuringia followed in 2005.

In 2007, Haußner was appointed Secretary of State at the Thuringia Ministry of Justice. He stood for election at the 2009 Thuringia state elections as a minor competitor for the conservative CDU. After the election the SPD seized the Ministry of Justice. Dietmar Herz replaced Haußner as the Secretary of State.

Since the beginning of 2011, Haußner has worked as consultant to the Croatian Ministry of Justice per pro first the GIZ (German Society for International Cooperation) and later the IRZ (German Foundation for International Legal Cooperation). He is currently continuing to work there.

== Private life ==
Haussner is married and has two children.
