= Intertek =

British multinational assurance, inspection, product testing and certification company

Intertek Group plc
- Type: Public limited company
- Traded as: LSE: ITRK; FTSE 100 Index Component
- Industry: Testing, inspection, certification and assurance
- Founded: 1885; 141 years ago
- Headquarters: London, England, UK
- Key people: Steve Mogford (Chair); André Lacroix (CEO)
- Revenue: ▲£3,431.6 million (2025)
- Operating income: ▲£619.6 million (2025)
- Net income: ▼£363.2 million (2025)
- Number of employees: 45,000 (2026)
- Website: www.intertek.com

Intertek Group plc is a British multinational assurance, inspection, product testing, and certification company headquartered in London, England. It is listed on the London Stock Exchange and is a constituent of the FTSE 100 Index.

== History ==
The origins of Intertek can be traced back to three businesses: a marine surveying business formed by Caleb Brett in 1885, a testing laboratory formed by Milton Hersey in Montreal in 1888, and a lamp testing centre established by the Association of Edison Illuminating Companies in 1896. These businesses were all acquired by the multidisciplinary services firm Inchcape plc during the 1980s and early 1990s.

During November 1996, Inchcape Testing Services was acquired by the private equity firm Charterhouse Capital Partners in exchange for £380 million; it was promptly renamed Intertek. By this point, the company was heavily involved with numerous governments and other authorities around the world. In America alone, agencies of the US government collectively paid Intertek $35.7 million in exchange for roughly 250,000 tests that were performed between 1994 and 1997. During the late 1990s, Intertek was the only American-based registrar for BS 7750.

In September 2000, Intertek's American subsidiary was reported to have allegedly been involved in the falsification of test data that had impacted multiple US government agencies; the U.S. Department of Justice brought criminal charges against 13 former employees of the firm for their role in the scandal. The news led to a planned floatation of the company being postponed. Richard Nelson, Intertek's chairman and chief executive, announced that the labs that carried out the work had been closed down and that the firm had reprocessed the relevant data. Almost two year later, new plans were announced for the company to be floated on the London Stock Exchange; at the time of the announcement, the company had 10,300 employees and operated in 99 countries through 149.

In June 2004, Intertek's ETL SEMKO division acquired the automotive part tester Entela Inc. On 19 September 2007, the firm announced its acquisition of National Software Testing Laboratories; that same year, it also acquired the analytical R&D lab Quantitative Technologies Inc.

In 2010, Intertek acquired Ciba Expert Services’ Environmental, Safety, & Testing and Regulatory businesses, which included Cantox Health Sciences (Cantox) and Ashuren Health Sciences (Ashuren); separately, it also bought Pacifica Marine. One year later, the firm purchased Labs & Testing S.A. (L&T).

During April 2011, the company acquired the technical services specialist Moody International in exchange for £450 million. In the early 2010s, both the energy and agriculture sectors were major sources of growth for the firm; in particular, Intertek benefitted from the enactment of more stringent regulations in the wake of the 2013 horse meat scandal through its involvement in food testing, although this sector only reportedly accounted for 2.5 percent of its total revenue at the time. Accordingly, during early 2013, Intertek recorded record profits accompanied by a 22 per cent dividend hike.

During 2015, in the aftermath of the Volkswagen emissions scandal, the firm experienced an increase in testing work within the automotive sector. Other beneficial trends for Intertek in the mid 2010s included greater public interest in sustainability, and the weakening value of the pound sterling. During the late 2010s, the firm focused upon increasing its operating margins and organic growth.

Under chief executive André Lacroix, the company made a series of acquisitions to broaden its services. In October 2015 it bought Professional Service Industries (PSI), a United States construction-materials testing firm, for US$330 million. In 2016 it acquired the Ottawa-based cybersecurity assurance firm EWA-Canada, and in December 2017 the product-security certification company Acumen Security. In August 2018 it agreed to buy Alchemy Systems, an Austin-based provider of workforce-training software for the food industry, from The Riverside Company for US$480 million. Later deals extended Intertek into renewable energy and environmental testing, including the solar and energy-storage assurance firm Clean Energy Associates in 2022, the Brazilian environmental laboratory Controle Analítico in 2023, and the North American metallurgical-testing business Base Met Labs in 2024.

In May 2021, Intertek acquired SAI Global's Assurance and Standards Business units. Two years later, the firm allegedly dismissed a whole team of ex-SAI Global executives over auditing failures.

The company rejected a bid worth $11 billion from EQT AB in April 2026.

On 18 June 2026 the two companies announced a recommended final cash offer under which EQT, through a newly formed holding company, Isotope Bidco, would acquire Intertek for £60.00 per share in cash, with shareholders also retaining the 107.7-pence final dividend, valuing the company at about £9.5 billion. The price was a premium of about 59 per cent to Intertek's undisturbed share price of £37.70 on 9 April 2026, the last trading day before EQT's first approach. EQT made the offer through its EQT X fund and said it intended to use Intertek to consolidate the fragmented testing, inspection and certification sector. The acquisition, structured as a scheme of arrangement, is expected to complete between the fourth quarter of 2026 and the first quarter of 2027, subject to shareholder and regulatory approvals.

== Operations ==
The company has over 45,000 employees across more than 100 countries and operates a network of more than 1,000 laboratories and offices. Centered around its laboratory testing services, the company provides quality and safety assurance to industries such as construction, healthcare, food and transport. Products tested include batteries, accessories, apparel and chemicals.

Intertek describes its work using the term ATIC (assurance, testing, inspection and certification). Following a 2023 reorganisation the group reports through five divisions: Consumer Products, Corporate Assurance, Health & Safety, Industry & Infrastructure, and World of Energy. The company markets a sustainability proposition it calls Total Sustainability Assurance (TSA).

== Leadership ==
On 16 May 2015, André Lacroix succeeded Wolfhart Hauser as CEO of the company.

== See also ==
- ETL SEMKO
