= Inga Koerte =

German neuroscientist

Inga Katharina Koerte is a German neuroscientist. She currently holds a dual affiliation as Professor of Biological Research in Child and Adolescent Psychiatry at Ludwig-Maximilians-Universität München (LMU Munich), Munich, Germany and as lecturer in psychiatry at Harvard Medical School (HMS), Boston, USA. Since 2018 she is associate faculty member of the Graduate School of Systemic Neuroscience (GSN) in Munich. Her research focusses on the effects of brain trauma on the brain's structure and function, as well as the development of diagnostic markers that can be used for both therapeutic, and preventative interventions.

== Life ==
=== Education ===
In 2006, Koerte received both her M.D. and her doctorate title (Dr. med.) from LMU Munich. Afterwards she pursued post-doctoral fellowships at the Paediatric Neurophysiology at LMU Munich as well as the Psychiatry Neuroimaging Laboratory (PNL) of the Harvard Medical School, Boston. In 2013 she achieved her habilitation in experimental radiology in Munich under Prof. M. Reiser.

== Career ==
=== Research ===
Koerte is well known for her research in the areas of traumatic brain injury, repetitive head impacts, neurodevelopment, and cutting-edge neuroradiology. She was the first to show alterations in the brain's microstructure following repetitive subconcussive head impacts in young athletes without a history of concussion, as well as structural changes in ice hockey players over the course of a play season. Together with her team, she detected signs of accelerated aging and neuroinflammation associated with exposure to repetitive brain trauma, identified risk factors, and biomarkers for neurodegeneration following brain trauma such as chronic traumatic encephalopathy (CTE). In 2012, her group was the first to detect microstructural brain alterations associated with heading the ball in soccer. Dr. Koerte is head of the laboratory cBRAIN (Child Brain Research and Imaging in Neuroscience).

=== Awards and honors ===
- 2021: Princess Therese von Bayern Award, Germany
- 04/2012: Else Kröner Memorial Award, Else Kröner-Fresenius Foundation, Germany
- 10/2011: Marc Dünzl Young Investigator Award, Deutsche Gesellschaft für Neuroradiologie, Germany

=== Current Positions ===
- 03/2019 - 02/2024: Leader of a Starting Grant of the European Research Council for analysing individual neurosteroid response after mild traumatic brain injuriy (NEUROPRECISE).
- 01/2017- 06/2020: Leader of a European multinational consortium (ERA-NET) of a multi-center (6 sites across Europe and 3 consultants from USA) study on traumatic brain injury in youth athletes (REPIMPACT), Leader of the German research team.
- 09/2017 - Co-Leader of an international, multi-centre initiative on large-scale analyses of neuroimaging data in sports-related concussion and paediatric TBI (ENIGMA).
- 07/2017 - Leader of a 5-year multidisciplinary, prospective cohort study on sex difference in sports-related concussion funded by the NIH, USA.

== Selected publications ==
Koerte IK, Ertl-Wagner B, Reiser M, Zafonte R, Shenton ME. White Matter Integrity in the Brains of Professional Soccer Players Without Symptomatic Concussion. JAMA. 2012 Nov 14; 308(18): 1859–61. doi: 10.1001/jama.2012.13735. PMID 23150002.

Sollmann N, Echlin PS, Schultz V, Viher PV, Lyall AE, Tripodis Y, Kaufmann D, Hartl E, Kinzel P, Forwell LA, Johnson AM, Skopelja EN, Lepage C, Bouix S, Pasternak O, Lin AP, Shenton ME, Koerte IK. Sex differences in white matter alterations following repetitive subconcussive head impacts in collegiate ice hockey players. Neuroimage Clin. 2017 Nov 21;17:642-649. PMID 29204342.

Koerte IK, Kaufmann D, Hartl E, Bouix S, Pasternak O, Kubicki M, Forwell LA, Johnson AM, Echlin PS, Shenton ME. A Prospective Study of Physician-Observed Concussion During a Varsity University Hockey Season: Part 3 of 4: White Matter Integrity in Ice Hockey Players. Neurosurg Focus. 2012 Dec; 33(6): E3. doi: 10.3171/2012.10.FOCUS12303. PMID 23199426.

Koerte IK*, Lin AP*, Muehlmann, M, Merugumala S, Liao HJ, Starr T, Kaufmann D, Mayinger M, Steffinger D, Fisch B, Karch S, Heinen F, Ertl-Wagner B, Reiser M, Stern RA, Zafonte R, Shenton ME. Altered Neurochemistry in Former Professional Soccer Players Without a History of Concussion. J Neurotrauma. 2015 Sept 1; 32(17): 1287–93. doi: 10.1089/neu.2014.3715. PMID 25843317 (* shared first authorship).

Guenette JP, Shenton ME, Koerte IK. Imaging of Concussion in Young Athletes. Neuroimaging Clin N Am. 2018 Feb;28(1):43-53. doi: 10.1016/j.nic.2017.09.004. Review. PMID 29157852.
