= Wolfhart Hauser =

- Born: Wolfhart Gunnar Hauser; 5 December 1949 (age 76); Munich, Germany
- Education: LMU Munich; Technical University of Munich
- Occupation: Businessman
- Years active: 1975–present

Wolfhart Gunnar Hauser (born 5 December 1949) is a German businessman, a former executive chairman of FirstGroup, and a former chief executive of Intertek, a British multinational inspection, product testing and certification company, from 2005 to 2015.

Hauser has a master's degree in medicine from LMU Munich and a doctorate from Technical University of Munich.

Hauser wrote his dissertation on the prevention of ski injuries, and went on to develop a ski binding that was certified by international quality organisations - his ski binding remains an ISO standard. Hauser was the chief executive of Intertek from March 2005 to 16 May 2015, and a non-executive director at Logica since 1 January 2007.

In July 2015, Hauser became the chairman of FirstGroup. In July 2019, Hauser did not stand for reelection at the AGM and stepped down from the board.
