= Ludwig Bachhofer =

German-American art historian

Ludwig Bachhofer (June 30, 1894 – March 1976) was a German art historian and professor at the Ludwig-Maximilians-Universität München and the University of Chicago.

== Life ==
Bachhofer began his studies in 1916 at the Ludwig-Maximilians-Universität München, but had to interrupt this due to the First World War. In 1918, he resumed his studies and received his doctorate in 1921 with a dissertation on the art of Japanese woodcut masters.

Between 1921 and 1922, Bachhofer completed a scientific training at the Museum of Ethnology in Munich under Lucian Scherman. In 1926, he helped to establish the Department of Japanese Art of the Ethnological Museum in Munich. In 1926, he was habilitated at the Ludwig-Maximilians-Universität München in art history and Asian archeology and worked there as a private lecturer. He held lectures on Chinese, Japanese and Indian art history.

In July 1933, he was appointed associate professor, but the responsible ministry disagreed with the nomination because of the "non-Aryan origin" of Bachhofer's wife. Since Bachhofer refused a divorce from his wife of Jewish origin and he was threatened with dismissal, the family immigrated in 1934 to the United States.

From 1935 on, Bachhofer worked as a professor of East Asian art history at the University of Chicago, and from 1941 as a full professor. From 1941 to 1945, he was also co-editor of the Art Bulletin. In 1965, he retired.

== Research ==
Bachhofer's research interests included East Asian art, with a focus on the history of art in Central Asia and its connection with India, Iran and China. In Germany, he was one of the most important experts of the new discipline of Asian art history.^{[1]} His work on the early Indian sculpture has long been considered a standard work. ^{[1]}

== Works ==
- Chinese art. Wroclaw 1923
- The early Indian sculpture. 2 volumes, Munich / Florence 1929
- A Short History of Chinese Art. Pantheon, New York 1946

== Literature ==
- Harrie Vanderstappen: "Ludwig Bachhofer (1894–1976)". In: Hartmut Walravens: Bibliographies on the East Asian art history of Germany. 1983
