= Marko Sarstedt =

German academic and a marketing researcher

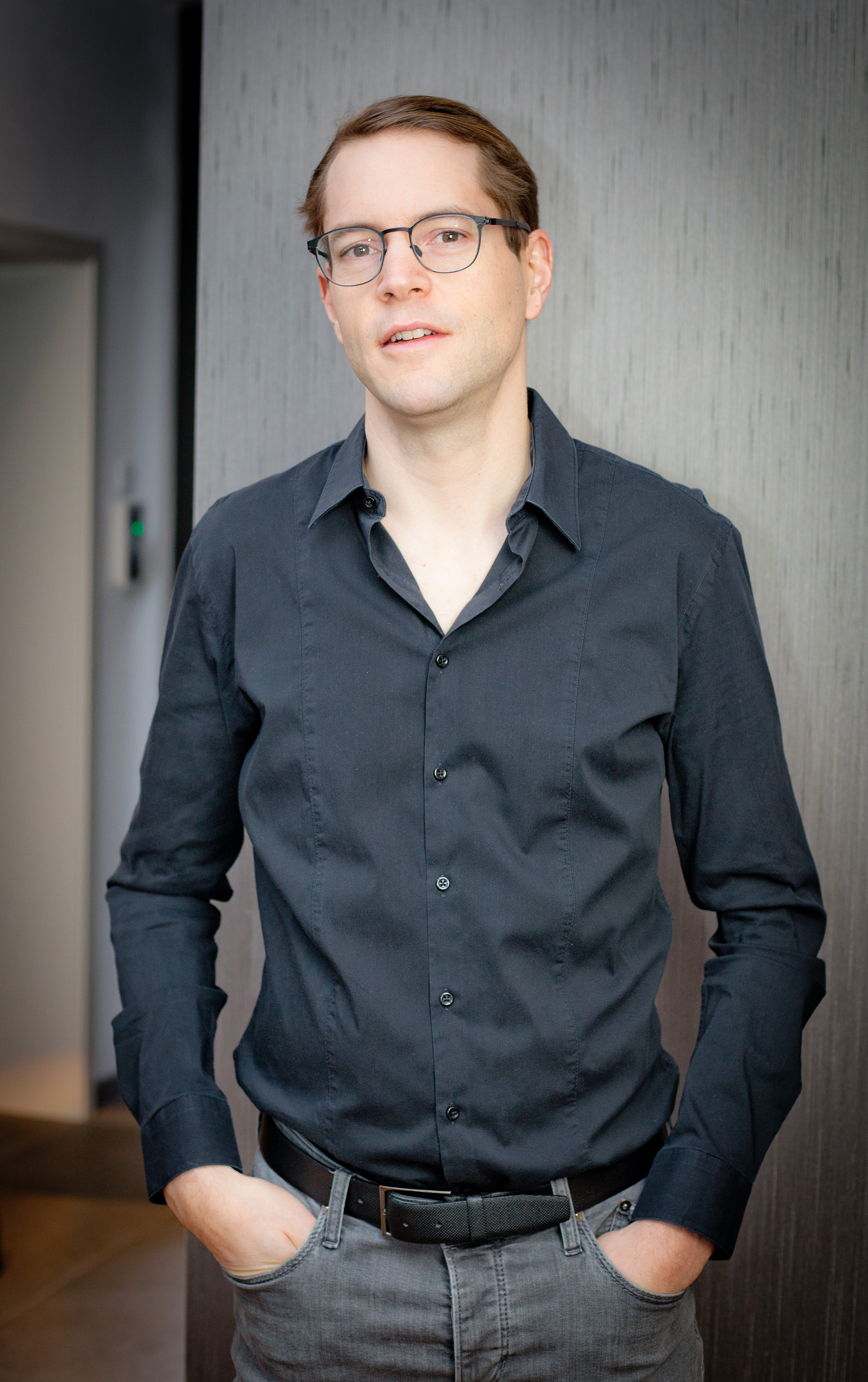
- Born: Gummersbach, Germany
- Occupations: Academic and marketing researcher
- Awards: William R. Darden Award, Academy of Marketing Science; Doctor Honoris Causa, Babeș-Bolyai University

Academic background
- Education: Diplom-Kaufmann; Master degree, Business Research; Doctor of Philosophy, Business Administration; Habilitation, Business Administration
- Alma mater: LMU Munich
- Thesis: Selected contributions to market-based management

Academic work
- Institutions: Otto von Guericke University Magdeburg; Monash University Malaysia

Marko Sarstedt is a German academic and a marketing researcher. He is a Full Professor at LMU Munich and Adjunct Research Professor at Babeș-Bolyai-University.

Sarstedt is the recipient of five Emerald Citations of Excellence awards and three Emerald Literati Outstanding Paper awards for his papers. He is a member of the Clarivate Analytics' Highly Cited Researcher List. Since 2019, he has been listed among the most cited researchers across all scientific disciplines and is ranked by The Frankfurter Allgemeine Zeitung as the second most influential business researcher in Germany in the research category. Sarstedt is the three-time recipient of the William R. Darden Award of the Academy of Marketing Science. He serves as Area Editor of Behaviormetrika and of Journal of Business Economics. He is the most cited author of some business journals such as Long Range Planning, Journal of the Academy of Marketing Science, European Business Review, Journal of Marketing Theory and Practice.

== Education ==
Sarstedt studied at LMU Munich where he completed his Diplom-Kaufmann degree, the German equivalent of Master of Science, in 2005. In 2007, he completed his Master of Business Research degree at this institution. He completed his Doctoral degree in Business Administration with summa cum laude at LMU Munich in 2008. Sarstedt received his Habilitation degree from the same university in 2012.

== Career ==
He was promoted to assistant professor in 2010 and taught for two years at LMU Munich before joining Otto von Guericke University Magdeburg in 2012 as a chaired professor of marketing. In 2021, Sarstedt was appointed full professor of marketing at LMU Munich. He served as adjunct professor at Newcastle University, Australia between 2011 and 2018, and at Monash University Malaysia between 2018 and 2020. In 2020, he was appointed adjunct research professor at Babeș-Bolyai University.

In 2019, he became a board member for research and innovation at Deutscher Marketing Verband.

On March 31, 2022, Babeș-Bolyai University awarded him the title Doctor Honoris Causa, the highest university distinction, for his remarkable contribution to enhancing the quality of academic research in business and economics, his methodological innovations in data analysis employing structural equations in the social sciences field, and his contribution to the development of the university's academic community, research activity and reputation.

From 2024 to 2026, Sarstedt served as President of the Academy of Marketing Science.

== Research ==
Sarstedt is a leading scholar on consumer behavior, research methodology, and psychometrics. As of 2024, his publications have been cited over 260,000 times. His research has been published in Nature Human Behaviour, Journal of the Academy of Marketing Science, International Journal of Research in Marketing, Journal of World Business, Multivariate Behavioral Research, Organizational Research Methods, and Psychometrika, among others. Sarstedt made several contributions on model estimation and specification, model evaluation, latent class analysis, measurement invariance assessment, and model comparisons in partial least squares structural equation modeling.

Sarstedt is best known for his work on partial least squares structural equation modeling, a regression-based technique for estimating causal models, which has gained wide dissemination in the social sciences. He co-authored two widely adopted books on the method, A primer on partial least squares structural equation modeling (PLS-SEM), which has been translated into Arabic, Chinese, German, Italian, Korean, Persian, Spanish, and Malay, and Advanced issues in partial least squares structural equation modeling (PLS-SEM), which has been translated into Korean, Persian, Spanish, and Vietnamese. The former book was reviewed by Adrian Leguina as "a valuable reference to acquire basic grasps on PLS-SEM". He also stated that the book will become "a basic reference for students, teachers, researchers, and practitioners."

Sarstedt's research extends to psychometrics, particularly the use of single-item measures and the validity of measurement in the social sciences. In 2019 and 2020, he published papers in Multivariate Behavioral Research, Nature Human Behaviour, and Psychometrika in which he and his co-authors transferred the concept of measurement uncertainty to psychometrics.

Since his professorship at the Otto-von-Guericke University Magdeburg, Sarstedt gained interest in consumer behavior topics, particularly context effects. He has published conceptual and empirical papers on the generalizability and of the compromise and attraction effects. As part of this research, Sarstedt and his co-authors evaluated the impact of serotonin deficiency on the compromise effect, showing that the effect is the result of deliberate and demanding thought processes rather than intuitive decision making.

Since 2019, Sarstedt has also worked on sensory marketing topics. His research in this field deals with the impact of ambient scent on consumer behavior and the role of different environments in product acceptance tests.

Since 2025, Sarstedt has published papers on open science practices in International Journal of Market Research and Schmalenbach Journal of Business Research. He also co-authored the book Expedition Open Science Land. A Travel Guide for Business Research, edited by the German National Library of Economics.

== Awards and honors ==
- 2009, 2019, 2023 - William R. Darden Award, Academy of Marketing Science
- 2015 - Taylor & Francis Citation Award
- 2015, 2017 - Emerald Citations of Excellence Awards
- 2015, 2017, 2019, 2020 - Emerald Literati Outstanding Paper Awards
- 2018 - Research excellence award, Otto-von-Guericke-University
- 2018 - 2020 - Member of the Clarivate Analytics' Highly Cited Researcher List.
- 2019 - Best textbook award, Verband der Hochschullehrer für Betriebswirtschaft for Advanced Issues in Partial Least Squares Structural Equation Modeling
- 2020 - Ranked 2nd among the most influential researchers in business and economy in Austria, Germany, and Switzerland
- 2022 - Awarded the title Doctor Honoris Causa by Babeș-Bolyai University
- 2024 - The Academy of Marketing Science-Parasuraman Best JAMS Paper Award for Long-term Impact

== Bibliography ==
=== Selected books ===
- A primer on partial least squares structural equation modeling (PLS-SEM) 4th Edition (2027) ISBN 978-1071998878
- Advanced issues in partial least squares structural equation modeling 2nd Edition (2024) ISBN 978-1071862506
- IBM SPSS Syntax: Eine anwendungsorientierte Einführung (German Edition) 3rd Edition (2018) ISBN 978-3800657612
- Market research: The process, data, and methods using Stata (2018) ISBN 978-9811052170
- A concise guide to market research: The process, data, and methods using IBM SPSS Statistics (3rd Edition). (2019) ISBN 978-3662567067

=== Selected articles ===
- Deer, L., Adler, S. J., Datta, H., Mizik, N., & Sarstedt, M. (2025). Toward Open Science in Marketing Research. International Journal of Research in Marketing, 42(1), 212-233.
- Sarstedt, M., Adler, S. J., Ringle, C. M., Cho, G., Diamantopoulos, A., Hwang, H., & Liengaard, B. D. (2024). Same model, same data, but different outcomes: Evaluating the impact of method choice in structural equation modeling. Journal of Product Innovation Management, 41(6), 1100-1117.
- Sarstedt, M., Hair, J. F., Pick, M., Liengaard, B. D., Radomir, L., & Ringle, C. M. (2022). Progress in partial least squares structural equation modeling use in marketing in the last decade. Psychology & Marketing, 39(5), 1035-1064.
- Rigdon, E. E., Sarstedt, M., & Becker, J.-M. (2020). Quantify uncertainty in behavioral research. Nature Human Behaviour, 4, 329–331.
- Girard, A., Lichters, M., Sarstedt, M., & Biswas, D. (2019). Short- and long-term effects of nonconsciously processed ambient scents in a servicescape: Findings from two field experiments. Journal of Service Research, 22(4), 440–455.
- Rigdon, E. E., Becker, J.-M., & Sarstedt, M. (2019). Factor indeterminacy as metrological uncertainty: implications for advancing psychological measurement. Multivariate Behavioral Research, 54(3), 429–443.
- Lichters, M., Brunnlieb, C., Nave, G., Sarstedt, M., & Vogt, B. (2016). The influence of serotonin deficiency on choice deferral and the compromise effect. Journal of Marketing Research, 53(2), 183–198.
- Henseler, J., Ringle, C. M., & Sarstedt, M. (2015). A new criterion for assessing discriminant validity in variance-based structural equation modeling. Journal of the Academy of Marketing Science, 43(1), 115–135.
- Hair, J. F., Sarstedt, M., Ringle, C. M., & Mena, J. A. (2012). An assessment of the use of partial least squares structural equation modeling in marketing research. Journal of the Academy of Marketing Science, 40(3), 414–433.
- Hair, J. F., Ringle, C. M., & Sarstedt, M. (2011). PLS-SEM – Indeed, a silver bullet. Journal of Marketing Theory & Practice, 19(2), 139–151.
