= Ernst Munzinger =

German businessman and military officer

- Born: 6 July 1887; Riga, Livonia, Russia (now Riga, Latvia)
- Died: 23 April 1945 (aged 57); Berlin, Germany
- Military career
- Allegiance: Germany
- Branch: German Army; Abwehr
- Service years: 1914–1918; 1939–1944
- Rank: Lieutenant colonel
- Conflicts: World War I; World War II

Ernst Gustav Adolf Munzinger (6 July 1887 – 23 April 1945) was a German businessman and lieutenant colonel in Army intelligence. After World War I, Munzinger became a supporter of the growing National Socialist movement and headed the NSDAP/AO chapter in his home country, Latvia. In 1933, the Latvian government expelled his family and he moved to Berlin.

At the start of World War II, Munzinger was drafted into counterintelligence under Admiral Wilhelm Canaris, where he came into contact with the growing anti-Nazi group around Hans Oster and Hans von Dohnanyi. After the unsuccessful assassination attempt of 20 July 1944, he was arrested by the Gestapo and held in Lehrter Straße prison, Berlin. On the night of April 22–23, 1945, just a few hours before his scheduled release, a special detachment from the Reich Security Main Office murdered him and other prisoners at nearby factory grounds.

== Early life and education ==
Munzinger, son of a brewer, on leaving school wanted to be a journalist. He emigrated in accordance with the wishes of his father, in 1883 from Zweibrücken (Germany) to Riga (Latvia). He began studying law at the Ludwig-Maximilians-Universität München. In 1910, he became a member of the Corps Isaria. He broke off his studies, enlisted in the Bavarian Army and served with the Royal Bavarian Infantry Regiment “Prince William of Hohenzollern,” No. 22 in Zweibrücken.

After the outbreak of the First World War, Munzinger's family was expelled from the Russian Empire and moved to Berlin. Munzinger was initially on the Western Front and later an intelligence officer on the Eastern Front. Munzinger reached the rank of captain and was awarded two Iron Crosses.

== Career ==
After the war, he went back to Riga together with his father. Munzinger married in 1920. The marriage produced a son and a daughter. Munzinger built a chemical factory in Riga after the completion of commercial training. After the takeover by the Nazis in the German Empire, Munzinger, who was the head of the Latvian chapter of the NSDAP/AO, was expelled since openly sympathized with Nazism. Munzinger moved with his family in 1933 to Berlin, where he led with his brother-in-law, the Department of Clothing and Textiles. After Kristallnacht, Munzinger averted from National Socialism because of the riots against the Jews.

During the Second World War, Munzinger was at the Supreme Command of the Wehrmacht (OKW) and worked as an intelligence officer in the Abwehr under Wilhelm Canaris. Munzinger came later in contact with the resistance group led by Hans von Dohnanyi and Hans Oster. He was promoted to the rank of lieutenant colonel in the spring of 1944, and ended his service in the Wehrmacht, returning to civilian life. Munzinger was already at that time informed about the planned assassination of 20 July 1944, but his role in the preparations is unknown.

== Death ==
After the failure of the assassination attempt of 20 July 1944, Munzinger was arrested by members of the SS in Salzburg and sent to the Lehrterstrasse prison in Berlin. During the Battle of Berlin, Munzinger was shot together with 14 other Resistance fighters during the night of April 1945 by Gestapo members at a nearby factory premises in the Invalidenstrasse. His body was buried in a mass grave in Alt-Moabit, but later transferred to the St. Paul's Cemetery in Berlin-Plötzensee.

== Personal life ==
On 12 September 1920, Munzinger married Senta Blenck in Riga, Latvia.
