= Stefan Dassler =

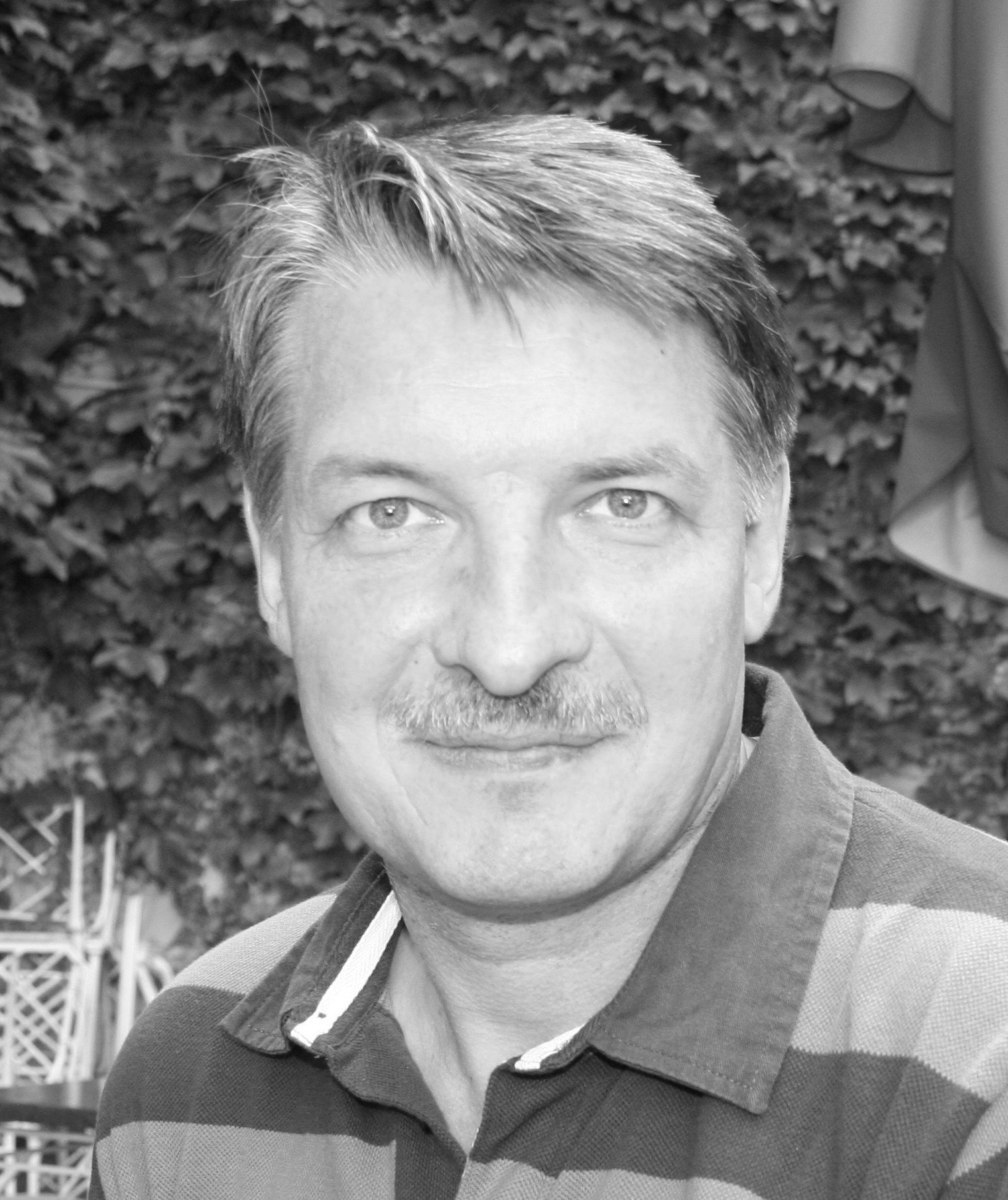
Stefan Dassler 2008

Stefan Dassler (25 October 1962 – 30 August 2023) was a German non-fiction author and lecturer for business studies.

Dassler was born and grew up in Bamberg and graduated at Dientzenhofer-Gymnasium in Bamberg in 1982. After his military service he studied Economics at the University of Bamberg, then moved to LMU Munich in 1984, where he studied business education with a focus on organizational psychology. He completed his studies in 1991 as Diplom-Handelslehrer (graduate business teacher). From 1991 to 1993, he studied philosophy.

From 1993 to 1995, he worked in a financial planning company in Bamberg, from 1995 to 1996 in the Graf-Stauffenberg-secondary school. Since 1996, he has been working as a teacher in various private schools in Bamberg.

After a first book published in 1996, Dassler has been working regularly since 2003 as a writer of non-fiction books and magazine articles dealing with issues such as business, education and information technology.

Dassler died on August 30, 2023, in Bamberg.

== Works ==
- Sozialkompetenz-Training in der betrieblichen Ausbildung, GRIN Verlag, München 1996, ISBN 3-638-70182-4
- Onlinenachhilfe – Nachhilfeunterricht via Internet, Wissenschaftlicher Verlag Berlin 2004, ISBN 3-86573-039-6
- Schülernachhilfe. Ein Leitfaden für Lehrer und Studenten, Wissenschaftlicher Verlag Berlin 2005, ISBN 3-86573-060-4
- Erfolgreiche Existenzgründung – mit besonderer Berücksichtigung der Ich AG, Mole Verlag, Hamburg 2005, ISBN 3-9809686-0-X
- Berufswahl und Ausbildungsstellensuche, Wissenschaftlicher Verlag Berlin, 2005, ISBN 3-86573-126-0
- Faszination Computer für Senioren, Wissenschaftlicher Verlag Berlin 2006, ISBN 3-86573-167-8
- Nachhaltigkeit als Bestandteil der Berufsausbildung, Wissenschaftlicher Verlag Berlin 2006, ISBN 3-86573-201-1
- Datenschutz in der modernen Informationsgesellschaft, Wissenschaftlicher Verlag Berlin 2007, ISBN 978-3-86573-279-8
- Bildungsfragen heute. Lernförderung, Berufsausbildung, Fortbildung, Wissenschaftlicher Verlag Berlin 2007, ISBN 978-3-86573-313-9
- Existenzgründung konkret. Ratgeber für angehende Unternehmer, CT Salzwasser-Verlag, Bremen 2009, ISBN 978-3-86741-149-3
- Schlüsselqualifikationen für Auszubildende. Übungen und Trainingsbeispiele, Igel Verlag, Hamburg 2009, ISBN 978-3-86815-141-1
- Sozialkunde FOS/BOS. Band 3: Gesellschaftliche Strukturen und Prozesse als Grundlage der Politik, Bildungsverlag EINS, Troisdorf 2009, ISBN 978-3-427-08007-7
