= Verband der Chemischen Industrie =

Association of the chemical industry in Germany

Official logo.

Verband der Chemischen Industrie (Chemical Industry Association) is the trade organisation and lobby group for the German chemical industry, headquartered in Frankfurt. It was founded in 1950 as a successor to the "Wirtschaftsgruppe chemische Industrie" (est. 1934), itself the national socialist successor to "Verein zur Wahrung der Interessen der Chemischen Industrie Deutschlands" (association for the protection of the interests of the chemical industry in Germany) , founded in 1877. It represents the politico-economic interests of 1600 German chemical companies and German subsidiaries.
