= Emmanouil Repoulis =

Greek politician

Emmanouil Repoulis Εμμανουήλ Ρέπουλης
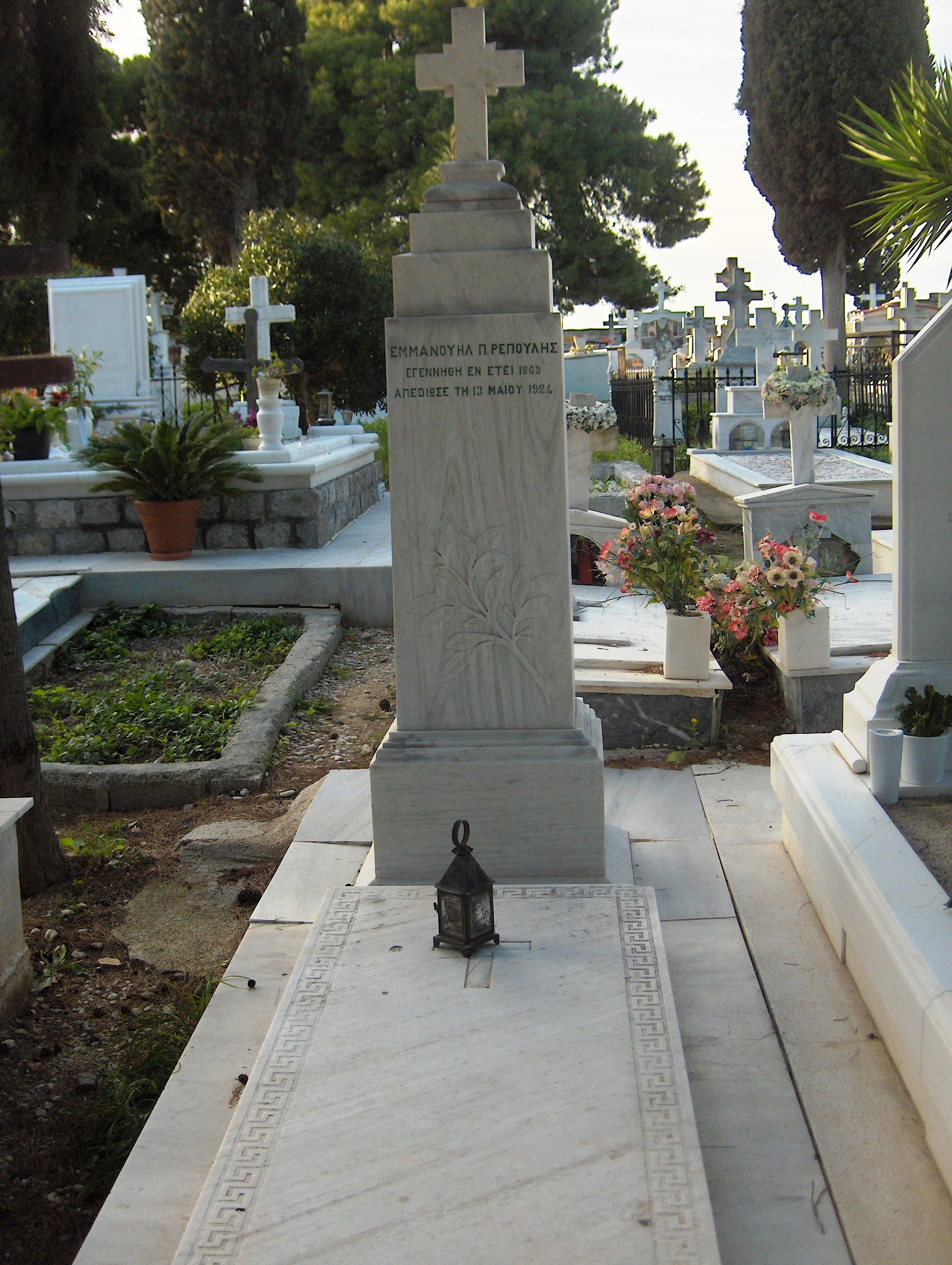
- Grave of Repoulis

Deputy Prime Minister of Greece Minister of Finance Minister for the Interior

Personal details
- Born: 1863 Kranidi, Greece
- Died: 24 May 1924 (aged 60–61) Kranidi, Greece

Emmanouil Repoulis (Greek: Εμμανουήλ Ρέπουλης, 1863 – 24 May 1924) was a Greek journalist and Member of Parliament. He was elected three times: 1899, 1905 (both with the party of Georgios Theotokis ), 1923 (with the Liberal Party) and was one of the deputies of the so-called 'Japanese Group' under Stefanos Dragoumis . He became deputy leader of the Liberal Party. Appointed Secretary General of the Ministry of Finance, Gevernor-General of Macedonia, Deputy Prime Minister, Minister for the Interior and Minister of Finance.

== Early life ==
Of Arvanite origin, and Albanian-speaking at home Emmanouil Repoulis was born in 1863 in Kranidi, Argolis. His family, although not particularly well-to-do, belonged to the most prestigious in the area. His father was Pantelis Repoulis (or Liepouris), a sailor, and his mother was Paraskevi, née Lambrou. He was their third child, and he had four brothers and two sisters.

He then continued his high school studies in Nafplion and Athens. After attending primary and secondary education, he enrolled in the Law School of the University of Athens and engaged in journalism.

He worked as a proofreader, since 1889, in the newspaper Kathimerini. After a year, he became the editor-in-chief of the other well-known newspaper, Akropolis and together with Vlasis Gavriilidis they broadened their horizons to the industrial and commercial issues of the country.

== Work ==
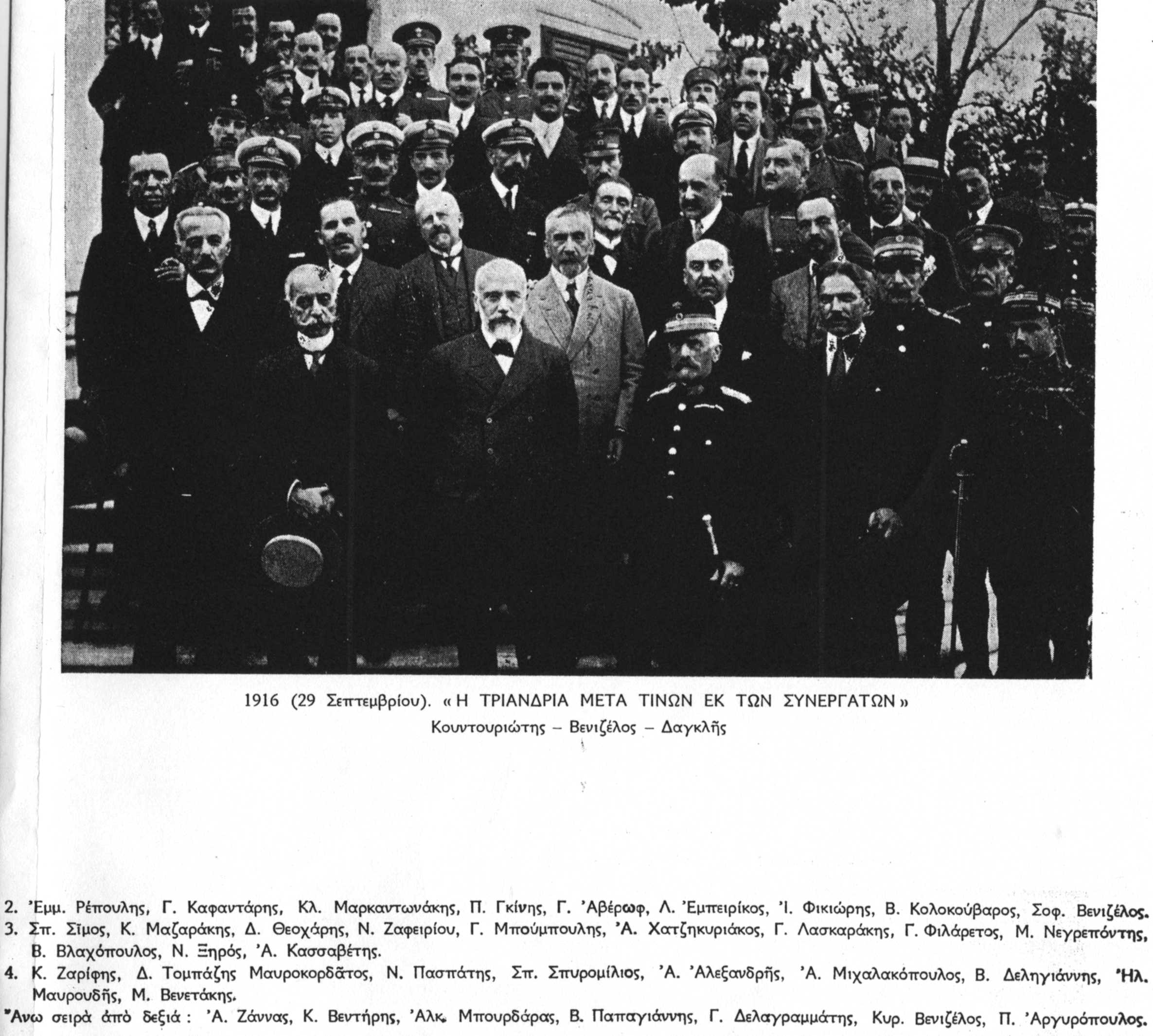
Emmanouil Repoulis in the Provisional Government of National Defence (2nd row, far left)

Repoulis was the first journalist who criticised through his articles the transactional politics of the day, the 'Old-Party System', the violence of the gendarmes, the militarism, the deviations of the pro-royal officers and in general the problems of the time. Later he also collaborated with the newspapers Estia, Neon Asty and Skrip. He also wrote articles in many magazines, such as Ellada by S. Potamianos. In 1899, he was elected a member of the Greek Parliament for Ermionida.

The prime minister at the time, Georgios Theotokis, assigned him the presentation of the state budget. Repoulis proposed innovative proposals. After his electoral failure in Ermionida in 1903, he was appointed Secretary General of the Ministry of Finance. However, he disagreed with the constant interventions in his work and resigned after a short period of time. In 1905, he was again elected a member of parliament, but was almost immediately expelled from the party of Theotokis and joined the so-called 'Japanese Group', which had a reforming program. The reformers, however, do not manage to prevail, despite their militant efforts, and disbanded their group in frustration. Repoulis alone, together with one or two of his other companions, continued to criticise and was active in the movement that led to the Revolution of 1909 .

When he approached Eleftherios Venizelos in 1910, he agreed with his visions for Greece and lent him his support. He became deputy leader of Venizelos' Liberal Party. After the Balkan Wars, while he held the post Minister of the Interior, he was also appointed as Governor-General of Macedonia. As Minister of the Interior, he introduced the law "On Municipalities and Communities". In 1915 he took over the Ministry of Finance, and from 1917 to 1920, he returned to the Ministry of the Interior.

After the assassination attempt against Eleftherios Venizelos on 30 July 1920, riots broke out in Athens and the assassination of prominent anti-Venizelist actors was being plotted. Repoulis, then deputy prime minister, ordered the arrest and imprisonment of all those threatened, while assigning their protection to a strong guard. When the united anti-Venizelist opposition won the November 1920 elections, Repoulis' moderation was blamed by some for the defeat of the Liberals. On 5 November 1920, he left with Venizelos (both self-exiled) for Paris.

== Death ==
In 1923 he was again elected as a Member of Parliament, but this time did not attend Parliament for health reasons. Emmanuel Repoulis died on 24 May 1924, in his hometown of Kranidi, from heart disease. His contribution to the reforming work of Venizelos was decisive. All bills that became laws of the state, have his own seal. The leader of the Liberals himself designated him as his successor in the leadership of the party.

== Bibliography ==
- Εμμανουήλ Ρέπουλης, «Κείμενα – Επιστολές – Άρθρα – Ομιλίες », Εκδόσεις Δήμου Κρανιδίου, 2001
