= Japanese Group =

Unofficial name of political group in Hellenic Parliament

The Japanese Group (Greek: Ὀμάς Ἰαπώνων) was an unofficial name for a political grouping in the Hellenic Parliament in 1906–08.

== Name ==
Although the group had been created in June 1906 after the parliamentary elections of that year, their popular name was given to them by the journalist Vlasis Gavriilidis, in an article in the Akropolis newspaper on 10/23 February 1907, where he likened their combativeness with the ferocity displayed by the Japanese soldiers during the recent Russo-Japanese War.

== Members ==
The group's members were:

- Stefanos Dragoumis, MP for Atticoboeotia, from the party of Charilaos Trikoupis.
- Dimitrios Gounaris, independent MP for Patras, hailing from the party of Georgios Theotokis.
- Petros Protopapadakis, MP for the Cyclades, from the party of Theodoros Deligiannis.
- Charalambos Vozikis, independent MP for Kynouria, hailing from the parties of Deligiannis and Alexandros Zaimis
- Apostolos Alexandris, independent MP for Karditsa Prefecture, elected for the first time in 1906.
- Emmanouil Repoulis, MP for Ermionida, from the party of Deligiannis
- Andreas Panagiotopoulos, MP for Aigialeia

The elderly Dragoumis was the group's titular leader, but the real driving force was Gounaris, a young lawyer, who had been influenced by his experiences during his studies in France and Germany, particularly the Bismarckian social legislation. Protopapadakis was an engineer, and remained Gounaris' closest collaborator for the rest of their careers, while Vozikis had achieved the remarkable feat of being elected to Parliament at the age of only 27.

The group comprised members from various parties and political orientations. This prevented their coalescence into a distinct political party, but the Japanese themselves never appear to have attempted such a transformation, i.e., opening the group to become a true mass party. Gounaris' own reluctance to step into the fore played the main role in this.

== Aims ==
The main aim of the "Japanese" was the political crisis of Greece following the state bankruptcy of 1893, the defeat in the Greco-Turkish War of 1897, and the imposition of the International Financial Control in its aftermath. The "Japanese" criticized the political establishment, and the fruitless alternation of parties in power, and proposed radical modernization policies, as well as maintaining an anti-elitist and anti-corruption rhetoric, aiming to uphold moral values.

== Dissolution ==
The group was dissolved when Prime Minister Georgios Theotokis offered cabinet positions to Gounaris, Protopapadakis, and Repoulis in June 1908, which the first two accepted. Gounaris was sworn in as Minister for Finance, but during the discussion for the budget he was so severely criticized by his former collaborators that he resigned. Despite its failure, the "Japanese Group" nevertheless served as a harbinger of political reform, which came following the Goudi Pronunciamiento in 1909, and the rise of Eleftherios Venizelos to power.

== Sources ==
- Tasos Vournas, Ιστορία της νεώτερης και σύγχρονης Ελλάδας, Papadima Editions, Athens 1997, Volume I
- Llewellyn Smith, Michael (1998). Ionian Vision: Greece in Asia Minor, 1919–1922. Ann Arbor: University of Michigan Press. ISBN 1-85065-368-2.
