= Mases =

Coordinates: 37°25′04″N 23°08′32″E

Mases (Ancient Greek: Μάσης, ἡ Μάσητος) was a city in the district Hermionis, on the Argolic peninsula, in ancient Argolis. It is mentioned by Homer as part of Diomedes's kingdom in the Catalogue of Ships in the Iliad, along with Aegina. In the time of Pausanias, it was used as a harbour by Hermione.

Its site is tentatively located near the modern Koilada, northeast of Kranidi.
