= Porto Cheli =

Porto Cheli Πόρτο Χέλι
- Settlement
- Location within Greece
- Coordinates: 37°19.6′N 23°8.6′E
- Country: Greece
- Administrative region: Peloponnese
- Regional unit: Argolis
- Municipality: Ermionida
- Municipal unit: Kranidi
- Elevation: 5 m (16 ft)

Population (2021)
  - Community: 2,603
- Time zone: UTC+2 (EET)
  - Summer (DST): UTC+3 (EEST)
- Postal code: 21300
- Area code: 27540
- Vehicle registration: AP

Porto Cheli (Greek: Πόρτο Χέλι, also Portocheli) is a summer resort town in the municipality of Ermionida in the southeastern part of Argolis, Greece. It is situated on a bay of the Argolic Gulf, 7 km south of Kranidi and 40 km southeast of Nafplio. The island of Spetses is located 6 km south of Porto Heli. There are ferry connections from Porto Heli to the islands of Spetses, Hydra and Poros, and to Ermioni and Piraeus. There was a small private airport, Porto Cheli Airport, south of the town, but it's closed since 2004 and now the land was sold.

The ancient city of Halieis (named Halike by Pausanias), excavated by Michael H. Jameson, is situated near Porto Heli.

The former King Constantine II of Greece lived with his wife, Queen Anne-Marie of Greece, in Porto Cheli. They owned a villa in Porto Heli, sold in 2022 and relocated to Athens.

The yacht marina within the bay has become a popular wintering port for pleasure vessels.

== Historical population ==
Year	Population
1981	904
1991	1,234
2001	1,913
2011	2,133
2021	2,603

== See also ==
- List of settlements in Argolis
