= PKH =

PKH may refer to:

- Porto Cheli Airport, the IATA code PKH
- pkh, the ISO 639-3 code for Pangkhu language
- P.K.H. or Pingat Keberanian Handal, a medal given by Sultan of Terengganu
