= Halice =

Halice may refer to:

- Halych, a historic city in Ukraine
- Halieis, a town of ancient Argolis, Greece
