= Gospel riots =

Christian riots in Greece in 1901

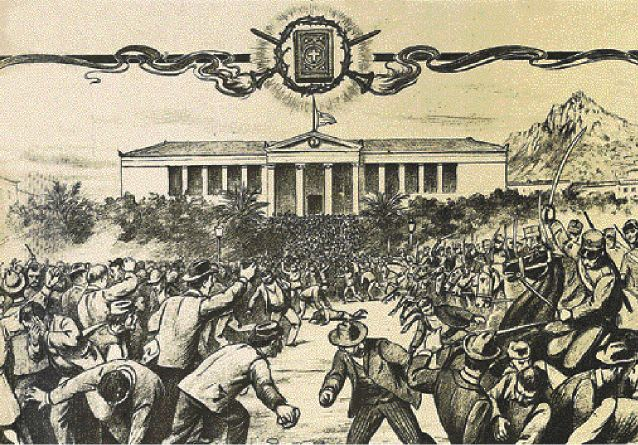
Clashes outside the University on Black Thursday

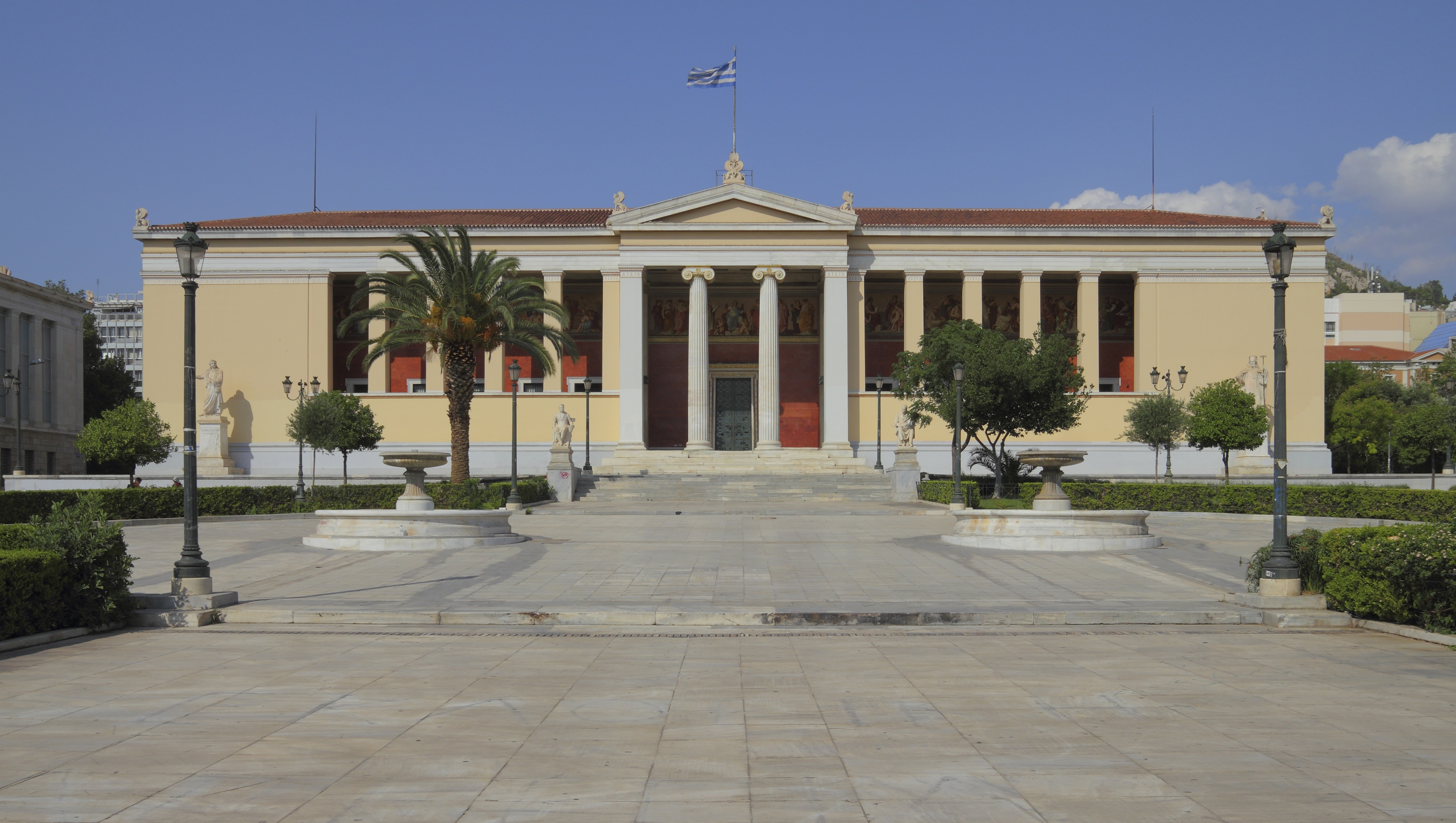
The same scene in 2013

The Gospel riots (Greek: Ευαγγελικά, Evangelika), which took place on the streets of Athens in November 1901, were primarily a protest against the publication in the newspaper Akropolis of a translation into modern spoken Greek of the Gospel of Matthew, although other motives also played a part. The disorder reached a climax on 8 November, "Black Thursday", when eight demonstrators were killed. (Note: The date is 8 November O.S. (Old Style). In 1901 Greece was still using the old-style Julian calendar, which in that year was 13 days behind the new-style Gregorian calendar used in Western Europe; so Black Thursday, 8 November O.S. was 21 November in the Gregorian dating used by the contemporary English-language press and diplomatic dispatches.)

In the aftermath of the violence, the Greek Orthodox Church reacted by banning any translation of the Bible into any form of modern demotic Greek, and by forbidding the employment of demoticist teachers, not just in Greece but anywhere in the Ottoman Empire.

The riots marked a turning-point in the history of the Greek language question, and the beginning of a long period of bitter antagonism between the Orthodox Church and the demoticist movement.

== Linguistic background: the rise of demoticism ==
=== Introduction of katharevousa ===
By 1901, the long debate known as the Greek language question had been underway for 135 years. Initial hopes that Ancient Greek itself could be revived as the language of the newly liberated Greek nation had proved illusory; modern spoken or "demotic" Greek had evolved far from its ancient roots, and the two languages were now mutually incomprehensible.

As a compromise, a grammatically simplified version of Ancient Greek known as katharevousa glossa ("language that tends towards purity") had been adopted as the written language of the new state in 1830. This meant that the spoken and written languages were now intentionally different. It was hoped that written katharevousa would provide a model for imitation, and that spoken Greek would naturally "purify" itself by becoming more like this written form, and therefore more like Ancient Greek, within a matter of decades. To provide additional motivation, the current spoken or demotic Greek was widely condemned as "base" and "vulgar", the damaged product of centuries of linguistic corruption by subjection to Ottoman "Oriental despotism".

After 50 years, spoken demotic still showed no sign of becoming "purified" into something more like Ancient Greek. On the other hand, katharevousa was proving unsatisfactory in use as a general-purpose written language. Scholars could not agree on its grammatical rules; and as a purely written language with no native speakers, it could not evolve a natural grammar of its own. Its Ancient Greek vocabulary could not be used to write about the objects and events of ordinary life without sounding stilted and unnatural.

=== Ancient Greek in schools ===
The problem was compounded by the educational system. Until 1881 only Ancient Greek—not even katharevousa—was taught in Greek primary schools, continuing the tradition of the Greek Orthodox Church, which had exercised an effective monopoly over education for centuries. (The church had always taught the ancient koine Greek of the gospels and the Divine Liturgy.) Children thus had to learn to read and write in a language they did not speak, or even hear outside church. This had been acceptable in previous centuries, when the schools had concentrated on training future priests; but it could not provide universal popular literacy.

=== Demotic renaissance ===
By 1880, many were beginning to feel that katharevousa had outlived its usefulness. Kostis Palamas led the New Athenian School in a renaissance of demotic poetry; Roïdis pinpointed the deficiencies of katharevousa, and coined the word diglossia to describe the unhealthy split between the spoken and written languages; and finally, in 1888, Ioannis Psycharis published My Journey, which transformed the language debate.

=== Psycharis and My Journey ===
Psycharis proposed the immediate abandonment of katharevousa and the adoption of demotic for all written purposes. He did not reject the relationship with Ancient Greek; on the contrary, as an evolutionary linguist, he argued that spoken demotic really was Ancient Greek, merely two thousand years further along in its evolutionary history. As a Neogrammarian, he believed that the essence of language was passed on by speech rather than writing, and he regarded katharevousa as an artificial construct rather than a true language.

Many agreed with him up to this point. But Psycharis went further: if demotic were to be used as the written language of a modern state, it would need a larger technical vocabulary. Educated everyday speech in the 1880s simply borrowed such terms from written katharevousa (for example: the word ἐξέλιξις, "evolution", was altered to ἐξέλιξη to conform to the morphology of spoken demotic).

Psycharis rejected all such borrowings. Instead, he coined the word ξετυλιξιά, which he claimed was the word spoken Greek would have evolved for the concept of evolution if it had been free of the corrupting influence of katharevousa. He created many such words on the same principle; his declared aim was to set up a revitalized, scientifically derived demotic as a new written standard based entirely on the spoken language, isolated from katharevousa and independent of it.

Some found the new coinages ugly and unnatural: "Psycharis' versions sounded like mispronunciations of learned words by uneducated people, who would be unlikely to be familiar with many of these words in the first place." Others were inspired by Psycharis' vision and became enthusiastic supporters of his version of demotic. Notable among these was Alexandros Pallis, whose translation was to play a leading part in the events surrounding the Gospel Riots.

Psycharis is widely credited with turning demoticism from an idea into a movement, which steadily gained strength during the 1890s. Although he met some opposition, it was at first mainly good-humoured, constructive, and centred on linguistic and cultural issues.

=== Linguistic situation in 1896 ===
By 1896, the situation might be summarized as follows: Ancient Greek was established firmly in the Church, in secondary schools, and also in primary schools (with some katharevousa there since 1881). Katharevousa was still used for every kind of administration and for non-fiction literature, but in prose fiction, it was just beginning to give way to demotic. In poetry, demotic had taken the lead.

The supporters of katharevousa were on the defensive, but the demoticist movement was split between the "extreme" demoticists spearheaded by Psycharis and Pallis, and the "moderate" demoticists who were less doctrinaire, and much more tolerant of borrowing from katharevousa (these moderates would finally win the language debate, 80 years later).

== Religious background: previous gospel translations ==
The Eastern Orthodox Church had never had theological objections, in principle, to translation of the Ancient Koine Greek gospels into a more modern form of Greek closer to the spoken language. "The first translation appeared in the 11th century and until the beginning of the 19th century as many as twenty-five had been published. Some of these translations were officially solicited by the Patriarchate at Constantinople, while others were the work of prominent theologians and monks. The main characteristic of these translations, solicited or not, was that those who undertook them were members of the Eastern Orthodox Church. Hence, they did not pose a direct threat to the authority of the church but merely a challenge, aiming at making it more open-minded and receptive to the changing times." (Note: One of the most notable of these pre-1790 translations was by Maximos of Gallipoli, published in 1638. The story of the production, and almost immediate suppression, of this translation exemplifies the political cross-currents that have all too often bedevilled translators of the Bible into Greek.)

This situation, however, began to change in the years following 1790, with the expansion in number and reach of the Protestant missionary societies. These societies opened missions all over Greece, the Levant, and the Near East, bringing with them (especially after 1830) new translations into the local vernacular languages.

The Eastern Orthodox Church regarded these Protestant-sponsored translations as attempts at proselytism (i.e., from one Christian denomination to another Christian denomination), and therefore as a direct threat to its religious authority. Accordingly, in 1836 and 1839 two encyclicals were issued by the Ecumenical Patriarchate of Constantinople (and approved by the newly independent Autocephalous Church of Greece) commanding that all translations undertaken by "enemies of our faith" should be confiscated and destroyed. At the same time, all previous translations, even if undertaken by "our co-religionists", were condemned.

These measures were successful in curbing the activities of the Protestant missions. However, the fact still remained that most Greeks could not understand the Gospels in their Ancient Greek form, a problem that had been publicly recognised by some senior figures in the Orthodox Church at least since Theotokis had published his Kyriakodromion in prototype katharevousa in 1796. Accordingly, some scholars within the Orthodox establishment continued to work on translations even after the Patriarchal encyclicals.

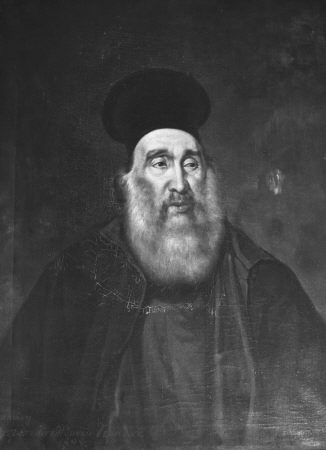
Neofytos Vamvas

The most notable of these was Neofytos Vamvas, head of the School of Philosophy, and later Dean, of the University of Athens. Vamvas had been a close friend and follower of Korais in Paris, and over the years 1831–1850, he led a small team of scholars in producing a translation of the Old and New Testaments into the "Pan-Hellenic" katharevousa of the time – not the spoken language, but close enough to it, it was hoped, to influence everyday speech and make it a little more like Ancient Greek. (Note: In 1835 Vamvas had published a Grammar of Ancient and Modern Hellenic Language for Beginners, which has been called "the katharevousa grammar that Korais never wrote". He may be considered one of the leaders of the katharevousa movement.)

However, despite the thoroughly patriotic Pan-Hellenic ideals behind the undertaking, the appearance of this translation in 1850 sparked bitter controversy—not least because, in the absence of local Greek backing for such a "radical" project, it had been sponsored by the British and Foreign Bible Society. In the end, it was not approved for public use until 1924; but its very existence, and the high repute of its creators, kept alive the prospect of a "respectable" katharevousa translation of the Gospels.

By the late 1890s katharevousa had completely lost the connotations of enlightenment republicanism it had carried in the days of Korais and Vamvas. By contrast with the more 'hairy' forms of demotic now in circulation, it seemed the soul of respectability and orthodoxy; and when the religious Anaplasis association requested approval for a translation of the Gospel of Matthew into "simple katharevousa", this was granted by the Ecumenical Patriarchate of Constantinople in 1896, and by the Holy Synod of the Church of Greece in 1897. The translation was published in 1900.

After this decision it could plausibly be argued that the overall ban on translations announced in the encyclicals of 1836 and 1839 was no longer in force.

== Queen Olga's translation of the Gospels ==
=== Origin of the translation ===
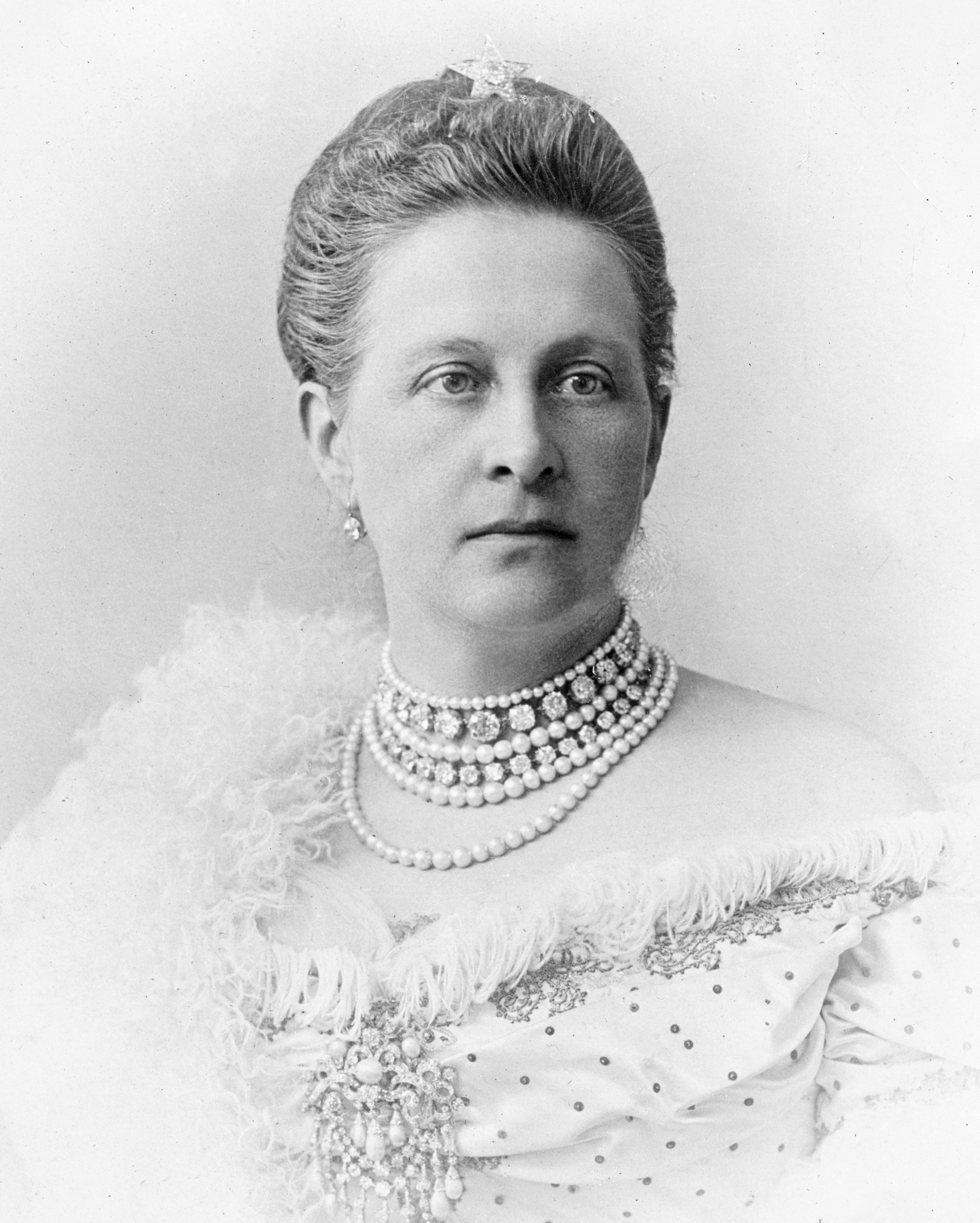
Queen Olga

Olga Constantinovna had served as Queen consort of the Hellenes since her marriage in 1867 to King George I of Greece. Only 16 when she first arrived in Greece after the wedding, she had won the respect of her adopted country by learning Greek within a year and engaging in a wide-ranging programme of charitable and educational work, which did much to maintain the prestige and popularity of the Greek monarchy.

However, as the decades passed and the 'Bulgarian threat' loomed larger in the north, her close family ties to the Romanov dynasty of Russia (Note: Through her father Grand Duke Konstantin, Olga was granddaughter to Tsar Nicholas I, niece to Tsar Alexander II and first cousin to Tsar Alexander III.) began to make her an object of suspicion to those who saw, or claimed to see, Pan-Slavic conspiracies behind every setback. After the trauma of Black '97, these rumours of conspiracy became much more widespread, and therefore more useful to political opponents of the monarchy.

Queen Olga undertook her translation of the Gospels from the best of motives. In the aftermath of Black '97, she had spent much time in the military hospitals, at the bedsides of the wounded soldiers of the defeated army. However, when she tried to raise their spirits by reading the Gospels to them, she discovered that few could understand the Ancient Greek words; they called it "deep Greek for the learned".

The Queen was used to taking the initiative in charitable and educational work and decided at once that the Gospels must be translated into "the language of the people, the language that we all speak". She commissioned Ioulia Somaki, her private secretary, to do the actual translation, and the manuscript was complete by December 1898. (Note: Somaki later (Mackridge suggests around 1938) published a memoir of these events under her married name Ioulia Karolou.)

=== Pre-publication consultation ===
The Queen now assembled a small advisory committee to edit Somaki's manuscript, consisting of Professors Pantazidis and Papadopoulos of the University of Athens, and Prokopios II, Metropolitan of Athens and president of the Holy Synod.

She also sent the manuscript to the Synod itself with a request for formal approval. After long delays and several exchanges of letters, the Synod decided not to give this approval, and instructed Prokopios to explain to the Queen why it "could not do anything else in regard to the matter".

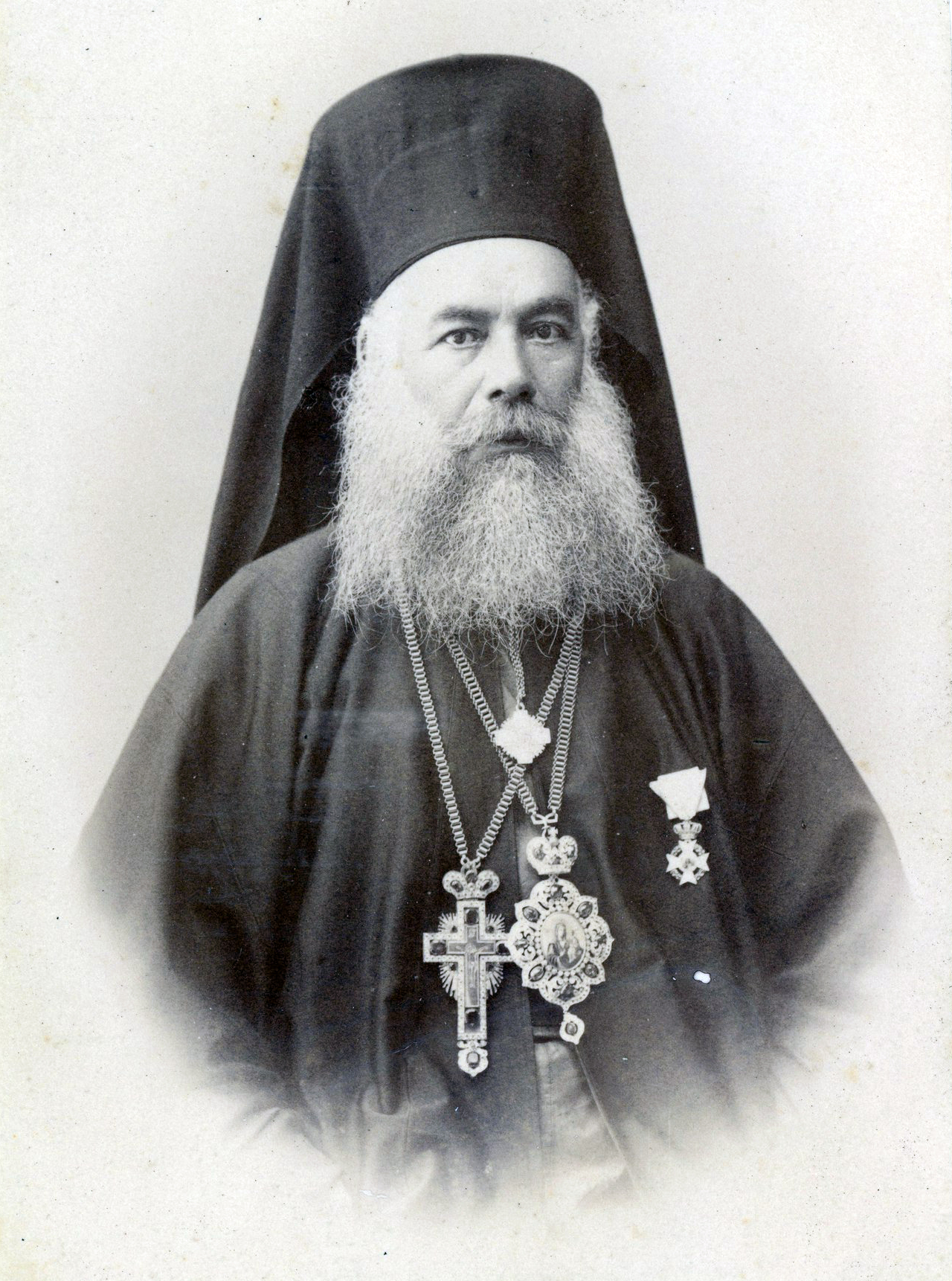
Prokopios II, Metropolitan of Athens, in 1901

However, Prokopios failed to dissuade the Queen, and indeed eventually gave her unofficial permission to proceed. Prokopios' motives in this affair have been the subject of much speculation. An eminent religious scholar and administrator, he was also the personal tutor of the royal couple's children, and in 1896 had been appointed, not elected, as Metropolitan of Athens on the insistence of the Queen, an appointment which "had raised more than a few eyebrows among high-ranking clergymen". Whatever the reasons, it seems that he found it impossible to say a definite no to the Queen.

The reasons why the Synod approved the Anaplasis translation, but not the Queen's, are also unknown; the archives are not available. It was probably not a katharevousa-versus-demotic linguistic issue, since the actual demotic language of Somaki's manuscript received hardly any criticism, or indeed mention, from even the most outspoken opponents of the translation. It seems likely that the decision stemmed from suspicion of the Queen (as a possible agent of the Pan-Slavic 'foreign finger') and of Prokopios (as a possible agent of the Queen).

The Queen also sent copies of the manuscript to a number of university professors, mainly theologians, with requests for comment. She received a wide variety of replies, ranging from dismissive to encouraging, and the ensuing debate began to attract public interest. (Note: Opinions differed even within the School of Theology at the University. Professor Zikos Rosis maintained that a mere translation would be useless, even misleading, without an exposition of the deeper meaning of the text; while Professor D. Kiriakos offered sincere congratulations on her "correct and most useful idea".)

Finally, the Queen consulted the government. "Hoping to acquire the government's sanction for the circulation and distribution of Somaki's translation in primary schools, Her Majesty approached the Minister of Religious and Public Instruction, Antonios Momferatos. Momferatos argued that before such a step was taken, the translation would have to be approved by the Holy Synod of the Church of Greece. He did, however, suggest to the Queen that should the Synod refuse to give its approval, the government would probably not prohibit the publication of an unofficial version of the translated Gospels."

On this basis—no official religious or political approval, but also no explicit prohibition—the Queen decided to proceed with publication in early 1901.

=== Pre-publication opposition ===
The Queen's wide-ranging consultations made the project common knowledge well before the publication date, and a heated debate ensued in the Athenian newspapers of 1899. Some supported her, but a vociferous majority were opposed, explicitly linking her translation with the Bulgarian threat in the North:

When at the capital of Hellenism, the original Greek language in which the Gospels are written is declared incomprehensible, how can not the same claim be made by the Bulgarian-speaking Greeks?

— Embros, 4 October 1899

This assertion that the "Bulgarian-speaking Greeks" they were already using a Bulgarian translation, and had been ever since the establishment of the Bulgarian Exarchate in 1870.

But few cared about such details. The point was that the Queen had touched a nerve when she "declared" so publicly that ordinary Greeks found Ancient Greek "incomprehensible". "The translation of the Bible into Modern Greek implied that the modern language was sufficiently different from the ancient language that uneducated people could not read Holy Writ. This was an implication that conservative nationalists strenuously opposed."

Since the foundation of the modern Greek state in 1830 the government had maintained the position that Ancient Greek, in its simplified katharevousa form, was the language of the nation. The language taught (very ineffectively) in schools was full, un-simplified Ancient Greek (although the pupils were not told that they were learning an ancient language; they were told they were simply learning to read and write). Almost all published writing was in katharevousa, using vocabulary from Ancient Greek, and looking very much like it on the page. Judging solely from written materials, then, it might indeed appear that modern Greece used the same language as the old Byzantine Empire, and was therefore the true heir to its glory and its former territories.

The uncomfortable gap between this constructed image and the substantially different demotic language used in everyday speech and thought by modern Greeks lay at the heart of the Greek language question. Even after the image began to crumble in the 1880s, many found it hard to let it go. There was an irrational, but lingering and very deep-rooted feeling that if the nation loosened its hold on Ancient Greek even a little, it would risk losing its claim on the ancient Byzantine territories forever; and this is what led the conservative nationalists to deny so strenuously the very existence of a gap between the ancient and modern languages.

The demoticists, who held the common-sense view that better rifles and a reformed army would be of more use in the coming Macedonian Struggle than a proficiency in Ancient Greek, were still very much a political minority in 1899.

Other opponents had different motives. In the early decades of the 20th century a general anti-monarchist sentiment was widespread in Greece, rising and falling with political events. (Note: Later, between 1924 and 1935, Greece would be a republic for a time.) Immediately after Black '97, "A wave of anti-dynastic feeling, not based on any ideological conviction, swept the country culminating in an unsuccessful attempt on the king's life on 14 February 1898." King George responded by touring the country to rally support; the Queen insisted on continuing her engagements without a military guard; and openly anti-monarchist activity died down again.

But the translation offered an opportunity to attack the monarchy indirectly, without explicitly naming the King or the Queen. In some cases party politics were involved. "It is no great coincidence that the individual who expressed in the severest tones his disapproval of the translation was Nikolaos D. Levidis, one of the most vociferous leaders of the Opposition. Therefore, political demagogy and its probable electoral gains should be considered instrumental in motivating individuals in their opposition to Olga's translation."

There may also have been an element of anti-feminism. "The fact that this translation was the work of two women may have been one of the factors that contributed to the furore that greeted its publication."

It is remarkable, in view of the storm of condemnation that later descended on Pallis' translation, that the one thing hardly criticised by anyone was the actual language of Somaki's translation, "a rather conservative variety of Modern Greek", with none of the innovations favoured by Psycharis' 'hairy' wing of the demotic movement. "It is characteristic that the work, with minor exceptions, was not attacked for any literary or linguistic inadequacies, nor did the main Purists take active part in the debate."

=== Publication in February 1901 ===
Publication of the initial print run of 1000 copies, at the beginning of February 1901, came as something of an anticlimax. The translation was presented as a study aid "for exclusive family use" at home; at the insistence of Prokopios it had been printed as a parallel text, with the koine original and the demotic translation on facing pages. According to the one-page preface, probably written by the Queen herself, the work was intended to reach out to those who could not understand the original, and help them not to lose faith. The preface also reminded readers that the Ecumenical Patriarchate in Constantinople had already given its approval to the Anaplasis translation.

The book was priced at one drachma (equivalent to ₯2,310 in 2025, or about €3), far below the cost of production, and immediately began to sell steadily. There were no public protests or demonstrations. It was noticeable that "... opposition preceded instead of following the publication of the translation. Once the work came out all talk about it receded ... one can only speculate about the reasons for this sudden silence ..." Evidently, it was the declaration of the need for the translation that had been the provocative act, rather than the translation itself.

By the end of March the book had sold so well that the Queen began to think of bringing out a new edition; and for the next five months, Queen Olga's translation dropped out of the news.

== Alexandros Pallis' translation of the Gospels ==
=== Origin of the translation ===
Alexandros Pallis was a member of Psycharis' inner circle, and an enthusiastic user and promoter of his new 'scientifically derived demotic'. This put Pallis firmly on the 'hairy' wing of the demoticist movement. The term malliaroi ('hairies') had come into use in late 1898, as a jocular term for demoticists, particularly the extreme demoticists on Psycharis' wing of the movement, because of their (alleged) habit of wearing their hair long. The word remained in use for the next century, with writers and their works being assessed according to their degree of 'hairiness'. Before Black '97, the same scale had been described more politely as 'Hellenic' at the traditional end and 'Romaic' at the other; but now the language debate had become less abstract and more personal. (Note: According to Grigorios Xenopoulos, the term first appeared in print in Estia on 26 November 1898, after being used in an Athens café by the Cretan writer Ioannis Kondylakis. A decade later, the usage was already established enough to be used in an encyclical issued by Patriarch Ioakeim and the Holy Synod of the Ecumenical Patriarchate on 16 March 1911, demanding "protection from any malliaros or vulgar influence".)

Pallis was a merchant and businessman, working for the Ralli Brothers in Manchester, Liverpool and Bombay; his career in the company was long and successful, and he eventually became a partner and director. He used some of his considerable wealth to fund various demotic literary activities, publishing work by several demotic prose writers, and in particular helping to finance the newspaper Akropolis, which had been printing pieces in demotic since its founding in 1883. It was Akropolis which in late 1901 would publish his Gospel translation.

Pallis had also published his own work, starting in 1892 with the first part of his translation of the Iliad; this was more uncompromisingly demotic than Polylas' earlier (1875–1881) version of the Odyssey, and already showed the influence of My Journey, published only four years before. Pallis was making a particular linguistic point with his choice of material to translate: "Another purpose of his translations was to show that demotic was capable of embodying the spirit of the founding texts (and the highest peaks) of pagan and Christian Greek literature, namely the Homeric epics and the four Gospels."

As a devout Christian, he also had a moral and religious motive. Pallis spent most of his life working in the British Empire, becoming a British citizen in 1897, and came to share its general belief that all nations and peoples should have access to the Gospels in their own spoken languages.

Finally he had a political, demoticist motive: "Most of all, his translation of the Gospels aimed to foster national, moral and political regeneration after the 1897 defeat, both by enhancing the prestige of the colloquial modern language and by democratizing and modernizing national culture and opening it up to the broad masses of the population."

Motivated as he was, Pallis saw little need for extensive consultations like those of the Queen. He naturally discussed the matter with Psycharis, who advised caution. "Psycharis was sensible enough to leave religion alone, and he had advised Pallis to do the same, arguing that it was provocative enough for the demoticists to be challenging the secular authority of katharevousa without challenging the Orthodox Church as well." This cautious approach was typical of the demoticist movement of the time: "Also, although this was not stated explicitly, it was essentially a secular movement." Up to this point, the demoticist movement and the Church had left each other alone; neither one had challenged the other. Pallis, however, was not dissuaded.

It is notable that neither of the demotic Gospel translators of 1901 was a mainstream demoticist. The Queen was a traditional royalist (Note: On parliamentary government, she is reported to have said "Je préfère être gouvernée par un lion bien né que par quatre-cent rats ..." (I prefer to be governed by a well born lion rather than by four hundred rats ...)) and Pallis was apparently alone among demoticists in wishing to challenge the Church.

Strongly motivated, and perhaps encouraged by the fact that the Queen's translation had been selling quietly but well since February, Pallis contacted his friend Vlasis Gavriilidis, the owner and editor of Akropolis, and arranged for serialised publication of the Gospel of Matthew starting in September.

=== Publication begins in Akropolis: 9 September 1901 ===
Akropolis, a daily broadsheet newspaper based in Athens, was essentially the creation of one man, Vlasis Gavriilidis, who founded it in 1883 and played a major part in running it until his death in 1920. By 1901 it had established a solid reputation as the most progressive of Greece's newspapers and one "of the few which cultivates a taste for general, non-political articles".

On Sunday 9 September 1901 (Old Style), the front page carried the first instalment of Pallis' translation of the Gospel of Matthew, under a full-width headline reading "ΤΟ ΕΥΑΓΓΕΛΙΟΝ ΕΙΣ ΤΗΝ ΓΛΩΣΣΑΝ ΤΟΥ ΛΑΟΥ", or "THE GOSPEL IN THE LANGUAGE OF THE PEOPLE".

Front page of Akropolis, 9 Sept 1901 OS

The translation itself occupied the right-most column, under a sub-heading quoting (in Greek) St Paul's words: "So likewise ye, except ye utter by the tongue words easy to understand, how shall it be known what is spoken?" (1 Corinthians 14.9)

The long editorial, starting in the left-most column, was written by Gavriilidis himself and is headed "Akropolis is continuing the work of the Queen". However, it placed Pallis' version in a very different social setting from that of the Queen.

In Mackridge's words, this "provocative editorial ... placed Pallis' initiative within the context of the effort in Europe, initiated by the French Revolution, to 'raise the lower classes'. The editorial claimed that all the social reforms that had taken place during the previous century had been inspired by the Bible. It continued,

Who amongst the peasants and the workers, who even among the merchants and the clerks and all those who have not completed secondary education can understand the language of the Gospels? No one.

"What was perhaps even more provocative was that Gavriilidis explicitly dissociated the Bible from filopatria [love of one's country] and misleadingly associated Pallis' translation with that of Queen Olga. He ended by claiming:

Rarely, perhaps for the first time, has the vernacular language taken on such a godlike gentleness and sweetness and harmoniousness as in the language of Mr Pallis. It is as though one is listening to the tinkling of the bells of a distant flock, such as those that first greeted the Birth of Christ.

=== Opposition ===
The new translation met immediate opposition that only gathered strength as the weeks passed. "Pallis' translation was vehemently attacked by most sections of the Athenian press, by the Ecumenical Patriarchate, by the Theological School of the University of Athens, by the parties of the Opposition, by leading Purists, by countless other institutions, societies and individuals alike, and eventually by the Holy Synod of Greece. The translation was considered anti-religious, anti-national, full of vulgar words, degrading the true spirit and meaning of the Gospel. The accusations levelled against Pallis himself were equally devastating. He was called a traitor; one who had no patrida [homeland]; an agent of Pan-Slavism; a foolish and despicable merchant of ivory and indigo; a sleazy person who alongside the malliari ['hairies'] was attempting to dislodge katharevousa as the official language of the state; an evil little creature who ought to be excommunicated."

==== Suspicions of Pan-Slavism ====
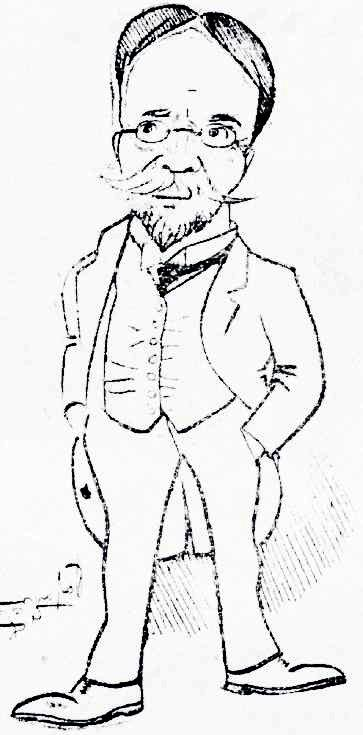
Vlasis Gavriilidis in 1898, from Estia

It is not known why Gavriilidis made such a point of announcing that Akropolis was "continuing the work of the Queen". Possibly he hoped to share the immunity from criticism that she had apparently been enjoying since February. If so, he took a great risk in associating himself with the Queen and her supposedly Pan-Slavist family connections; it seems that many took – or pretended to take – his introductory editorial as a declaration of intent to "continue the Queen's work" of Pan-Slavic subversion. All the old opponents of the Queen's translation immediately sprang to the attack again with redoubled energy, since Pallis and Gavriilidis had struck the same nerve as the Queen: the gap between the spoken and written languages. The format of the Queen's book had only implied that some of the least educated might need a little help with written Ancient Greek; now Gavriilidis had announced on a front page that a majority of the population could not understand it at all. The fact that this was true did nothing to diminish the reawakened fury of the conservative nationalists.

Gavriilidis, however, continued to insist on the link with the Queen. "Throughout the whole of October, in the columns of Akropolis, he continued emphatically to link Pallis' translation with that of Queen Olga, pointing out that the former was merely the continuation of the latter. In fact, he phrased his articles in a way that implied that the Queen herself was actually behind Pallis' translation."

This only served to confirm the popular suspicion that Pallis' translation was the next step in some Pan-Slavic master-plan. By November the two very different translations had become inextricably linked in the public mind; they would now stand or fall together.

==== Suspicions of foreign Protestant influence ====
Pallis' translation, however, while still subject to all the old criticisms that had been directed at the Queen's work, also attracted new kinds of political, linguistic and personal attack. His long residence in the British Empire aroused suspicions of British influence, and his adopted British nationality laid him open to the accusation of being a traitor, "one who had no patrida". British influence in itself would not have been too threatening, since Britain had always been a reliable supporter of the young Greek state; but the British were predominantly Protestant, and the thought of a Protestant 'foreign finger' awoke memories of the 1830s threat from the missionary societies that had brought about the ban on Bible translations in the first place. Although Pallis was an Orthodox believer, he had certainly "developed anti-clerical leanings and had come to believe that the sacred texts of Christianity should be available to all people in their own language for their own private study." To the Orthodox Church, these seemed suspiciously similar to Protestant views, coming as they did from a British citizen.

==== Linguistic criticism ====
The actual language of the translation also provoked widespread criticism. It was not just demotic, but Psycharis' 'scientifically derived' demotic; and Pallis did not seem to realise that many of Psycharis' innovations, while perhaps charming and natural in the chatty reminiscences of My Journey, might seem out of place and even offensive in the context of a holy book. Psycharis' rigid linguistic rules did not allow for a change of register to a more elevated style. In fact, any such change was deprecated as contamination from katharevousa. (Note: "... Psycharis' demotic was like an ausbau language in the sense that he systematically set about making it as different as possible from katharevousa, which was the Other that helped his demotic to define itself." In 1903 Palamas would describe it, with approval, as "the exclusively and chemically pure demotic grammar which the author of My Journey means to impose".) "Many readers were shocked by the sheer novelty of seeing a familiar text in the unfamiliar guise of a highly colloquial and sometimes idiosyncratic variety of their language. Protestors objected, for example, to the rendering of 'Mount of Olives' by the folksy-sounding 'Ελαιοβούνι' instead of the original 'Ορος των Ελαιών'."

As the weeks passed and the dispute became more heated, some opponents began to invent further 'examples'. For Luke 23.4, "Remember me, Lord, when thou comest into thy kingdom", the Ancient Greek is 'Μνήσθητί μου, Κύριε, όταν έλθης εν τη βασιλεία σου'. A rumour began to circulate that Pallis had translated this as 'Θυμήσου με, αφεντικό, όταν έρθεις στα πράματα', which might be rendered as "Remember me, boss, when you get in". This was completely false. The rumour, however, spread faster than the truth. (Note: In fact Pallis would not publish his version of Luke until the next year, and his actual translation was 'Ιησού, θυμήσου με όταν πας στη βασιλεία σου'.)

As demonstrations began in the streets and opinion became more polarised, some conservatives began to take up extreme positions. "In the Greek Parliament a former minister of Religious Affairs and Education, Konstantinos Papamichalopoulos, likened the demonstrations to the national insurrection of 1821: the demonstrators, he asserted, driven by 'divine inspiration', had risen up in defence of the 'divine language', which was no less sacred than religion itself." (Note: Papamichalopoulos expressed this view on other occasions too. "Unlike the case of Hebrew and Arabic, there is no official dogma in the Orthodox Church stating that the Greek language is sacred. Nevertheless, some extreme nationalist Greeks have argued that God chose the Greek language to record and disseminate His message, and even that Divine Providence had ensured that in pre-Christian times Greek had developed into a medium capable of expressing the Word of God. For such people Greek is the sacred language of a chosen people. This was claimed by a member of the Greek parliament, Konstantinos Papamichalopoulos, during a debate on the language of school readers in 1907.")

This position – that the whole of the Ancient Greek language was uniquely sacred, and specially designed by the Christian God – was quite new. The Ancient Greek revival movement of the early 1800s had viewed it in a much more humanist spirit, as the language of Greek civilisation as a whole. In 1853 Soutsos, one of the most enthusiastic revivalists, had declared "that the hearts and minds of the modern Greeks will be elevated by writing Ancient Greek, and that they will thereby learn Truth and Freedom". There had been no mention of God.

It is notable that the most extravagant claims for the divine quality of Ancient Greek came just as it was losing its privileged position in society.

== See also ==
- Oresteia riots: a similar event in 1903, due to reactions of katharevousa supporters against a translation into dimotiki of the Oresteia trilogy.
