= Oresteia riots =

1903 riot in Greece

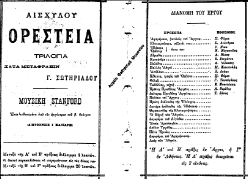
Τhe program of the play

The Oresteia riots (Greek: Ορεστειακά, Orestiaka) were a series of riots against the translation of the ancient tragedy Oresteia into Demotic Greek. The riots broke out in November 1903 and resulted in two deaths.

== Background ==
The Greek language question -the dispute on whether katharevousa or Demotic Greek should be used as the language of the state and of the people- was a controversial topic at the time. The theoretical clashes between the two factions had already resulted in the Gospel riots in 1901 after a translation of the Gospel of Matthew into a "radical" version of Demotic Greek and a reaction by supporters of katharevousa.

== The events ==
The triggering of the riots was the translation and premiere in the theater of the ancient Greek trilogy Oresteia by Georgios Sotiriadis. The play caused a reaction by fanatic supporters of a more ancient-like katharevousa version of the Greek language. Georgios Mistriotis, a professor of linguistics in the University of Athens, was the main inciter of the riots encouraging students and pro-katharevousa newspapers to participate in rallies against the play.

The government of Dimitrios Rallis did not accept the demand to ban the play and riots occurred outside of the University of Athens. On November 16, the army interfered shooting against the rioters, resulting in two deaths and 7 injured. This was the last day of the riots which were subsequently ended, with their main orchestrator returning to his duties as a university professor towards the end of the January 1904.
