= Neophytos Vamvas =

Greek cleric and philologist (1770–1856)

His Beatitude Neophytos Vamvas
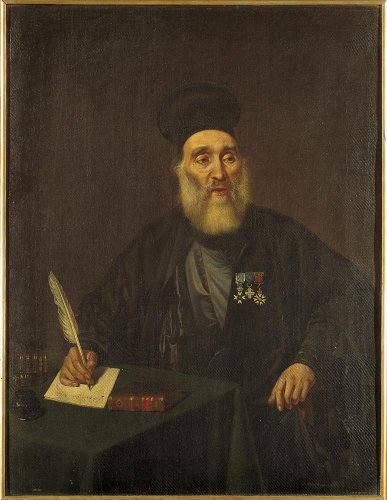

Dean of the School of Philosophy (University of Athens)
- In office 1837–1838
- Preceded by: Established
- Succeeded by: Kyriakos Domnandos
- In office 1841–1844
- Preceded by: Kyriakos Domnandos
- Succeeded by: Philip Ioannou

Personal details
- Born: 1770 Chios, Ottoman Empire (now Greece)
- Died: 9 January 1856 (aged 85–86) Athens, Greece
- Profession: Priest, Professor, Dean
- Known for: Modern Greek translation of the Bible
- Scientific career
- Education: École Polytechnique
- Fields: Chemistry; Mathematics
- Workplaces: University of Athens
- Notable students: Stamatios D. Krinos; Konstantinos Negris

Neophytos Vamvas (Greek: Νεόφυτος Βάμβας; 1770–9 January 1856) was a priest, philosopher, philologist, author, professor, and dean. He was the first dean of the philosophical school at the University of Athens. He is known for being part of the Neophytos incident. The incident was similar to the Methodios Affair, an incident that occurred one hundred years prior. He was one of the most influential figures of modern Greek education. He was considered the teacher of the nation.

Vamvas was born on the island of Chios in 1770. His secular name was Nikolaos. He was ordained a deacon at age 20 and in 1804 went to study in France, where he met Adamantios Korais.

On his return to Greece, he taught in Chios, at the Ionian Academy of Corfu, at the first High School (Gymnasium) of Syros and later in the newly founded University of Athens.

His main contribution to Greek literature is his translation of the Bible into modern Greek (New Testament published in 1833, Old Testament published in 1850), an endeavour that was opposed at that time by ultraconservative circles within the Church of Greece (cf. Greek language question). The controversy led to the Neophytos Incident, an issue similar to the Methodios Affair. The Ecumenical Patriarchate in Constantinople issued an encyclical condemning the translation. It was "based on the Textus Receptus and was written in a form of Katharevousa that was extremely close to the original "Koine" Greek, being more like a paraphrase than a translation. Publishing the Vamvas Bible was forbidden. His version was finally allowed in 1924 and is now in widespread use, being the official version of the Bible used by Greek Evangelical Churches. His translation is based on the Masoretic text, meaning it uses the 39-book canon for the Old Testament.

He died in Athens on 9 January 1856.

== History ==
He was born on the island of Chios. His parents' names were Isidoros and Stamatia. His parents were poor. He began his studies in Chios. He was very intelligent. He learned the acceptable sciences of the time. He studied physics, astronomy, and mathematics. He became an expert in the Greek language. He was ordained a priest in 1791. He continued his studies on the island of Sifnos in 1793. He studied at the flourishing school of Misail Patmios. He was 17 years old. He continued his studies on the island of Patmos with Daniel Kerameas. He wanted to continue his studies in Pisa, Italy, because he wanted to expand his knowledge base. He returned to Chios and studied with Dorotheos Proios, who was an expert in mathematics. By the year 1796, he had followed Proios to Constantinople. He also traveled to Bucharest and other parts of the Ottoman world. When he returned to Constantinople, he became the teacher of the family of George Mavrokordatos and Konstantinos Hatzeris. Hatzeris was an interpreter for the Ottoman Fleet. Vamvas followed Proios and Hatzeris to Wallachia. By 1804, Hatzeris was beheaded, and Vamvas returned to Constantinople. Vamvas began to teach the Phanariot families. Some of his students included Ephrosyne Mavrokordatos and Constantinos Soutsos. He participated in the compilation of an important Greek dictionary referred to as Kivotos (Κιβωτού). The director of the project was Proios. Around this period he joined the museum of the Magali Scoli tou Genous⁣⁣. In 1804, he took over as Headmaster of the Magali Scoli tou Genous.

Four years later, in 1808, he traveled to Paris and met the eminent Adamantios Korais⁣⁣. He helped Vamvas in his advanced studies. He maintained a close relationship with Korais. While Vamvas was in Paris, he attended classes in Chemistry with Louis Jacques Thénard⁣⁣. He translated his book Treatise of Elementary Chemistry into the Greek language. He also studied the works of Philipp Karl Buttmann and François Thurot⁣⁣. In Paris, he taught Greek and traded carpets to make a living. He joined the Filiki Eteria⁣⁣. He returned to Chios in 1815. He took over the direction of the high school. During this period he met Konstantinos Negris. He was his teacher. In April 1821, he traveled to Hydra to recruit the Kountouriotis brothers to liberate the island of Chios. While he was in Hydra, he followed Demetrios Ypsilantis and became his secretary. He followed him around while he fought in battles. Vamvas inspired the rebels to fight with motivational speeches. After seeing the devastation of his home island after the Chios massacre, he dedicated himself to education. He settled on the Ionian Island of Corfu in 1828. He taught at the Ionian Academy. The islands were under English mandate.

Around 1833, Vamvas traveled to the island of ⁣⁣Syros⁣⁣ and became the director of the school. He taught philosophy, philology, mathematics, chemistry, and physics. There he met Stamatios D. Krinos⁣⁣. He published several books and translated the Old Testament into the modern language. By the year 1836, he settled in ⁣⁣Piraeus⁣⁣. One year later, at the recommendation of the modern Greek leadership, namely because of his friendship with Adamantios Korais and Demetrios Ypsilantis, he was selected to become professor of philosophy at the University of Athens. He did not join the theological school because he was considered a radical. He became the dean of the Philosophy School. He was also ordained an archimandrite. He remained a professor at the university until 1854.

== Neophytos incident ==
The Neophytos incident was similar in nature to the Methodios Affair. Vamvas translated the Bible into the modern Greek language. Methodios Anthrakites was charged with a similar offense. Methodios supported the use of the people's language in education instead of archaic forms of Greek. The incident led to the Methodios Affair. Greek education was under the grasp of Korydalism. The mentality continued after the founding of the Greek state. The controversy known as the Neophytos Incident erupted because Vamvas tried to translate the Bible into modern Greek, the people's language. The translation was immediately condemned by Church officials. The Holy Synod of the Church of Greece disapproved of the publication between 1835 and 1836. The Ecumenical Patriarchate in Constantinople issued an encyclical condemning any translation of the Bible into vernacular Greek (1836). Publishing the book was forbidden. Constantinos Oikonomos, an expert in the Greek language and Orthodox scholar and theologian, wrote a treatise in defense of the publication; it was four volumes. The disagreement is known as the Neophytos Incident. The Vamvas version of the Bible was eventually accepted.

== Literary works ==
Books and Articles authored by Neophytos Vamvas
Date	Title	Title in English
1825	Γραμματική της Αρχαίας Ελληνικής Γλώσσης : Συνταχθείσα εις την Κοινήν Γλώσσαν δια τους Μαθητάς της εν Χίω Δημοσίας Σχολής Υπό Νεοφύτου Βάμβα.	Grammar of the Αncient Greek language: Compiled in the Common Language for the Students of the Public School in Chios By Neophytos Vamvas.
1846	Τεχνολογικόν της Αρχαίας Ελληνικής Γλώσσης Συνταχθέν υπό Ν. Βάμβα	Technology of the Ancient Greek Language Written by N. Vamvas
1846	Γραμματική της Αρχαίας και της Σημερινής Ελληνικής Γλώσσης / Συνταχθείσα δια τους Αρχαρίους υπό Νεοφύτου Βάμβα	Grammar of the Ancient and Modern Greek Language / Compiled for Beginners by Neophytos Vambas
1849	Γραμματική της Αρχαίας Ελληνικής Γλώσσης Παράλληλος με την Σημερινήν Υπο Ν. Βάμβα	Grammar of the Ancient Greek Language Parallel to the Modern By N. Vamvas

== See also ==
- Gemistos Plethon

== Bibliography ==
- Phōteinos, Grēgorios (1865). Τα Νεαμονησια [Neamonisia]. Chios, Greece: K.M. Prokidoy.
- Frazee, Charles A. (1969). The Orthodox Church and independent Greece, 1821-1852. Cambridge, England: Cambridge University Press. ISBN 9780521072472.
- Johnston, Alexandre; Loughlin, Felicity (2020). Antiquity and Enlightenment Culture New Approaches and Perspectives. Cambridge, England: Brill Publishing. ISBN 9789004412675.
- Glenny, W. Edward; Ross, William A. (2021). T&T Clark Handbook of Septuagint Research. London, United Kingdom: Bloomsbury Publishing. ISBN 9780567680266.
