= Kranidi =

Town in Peloponnese, Greece

Kranidi Κρανίδι
- Municipal unit
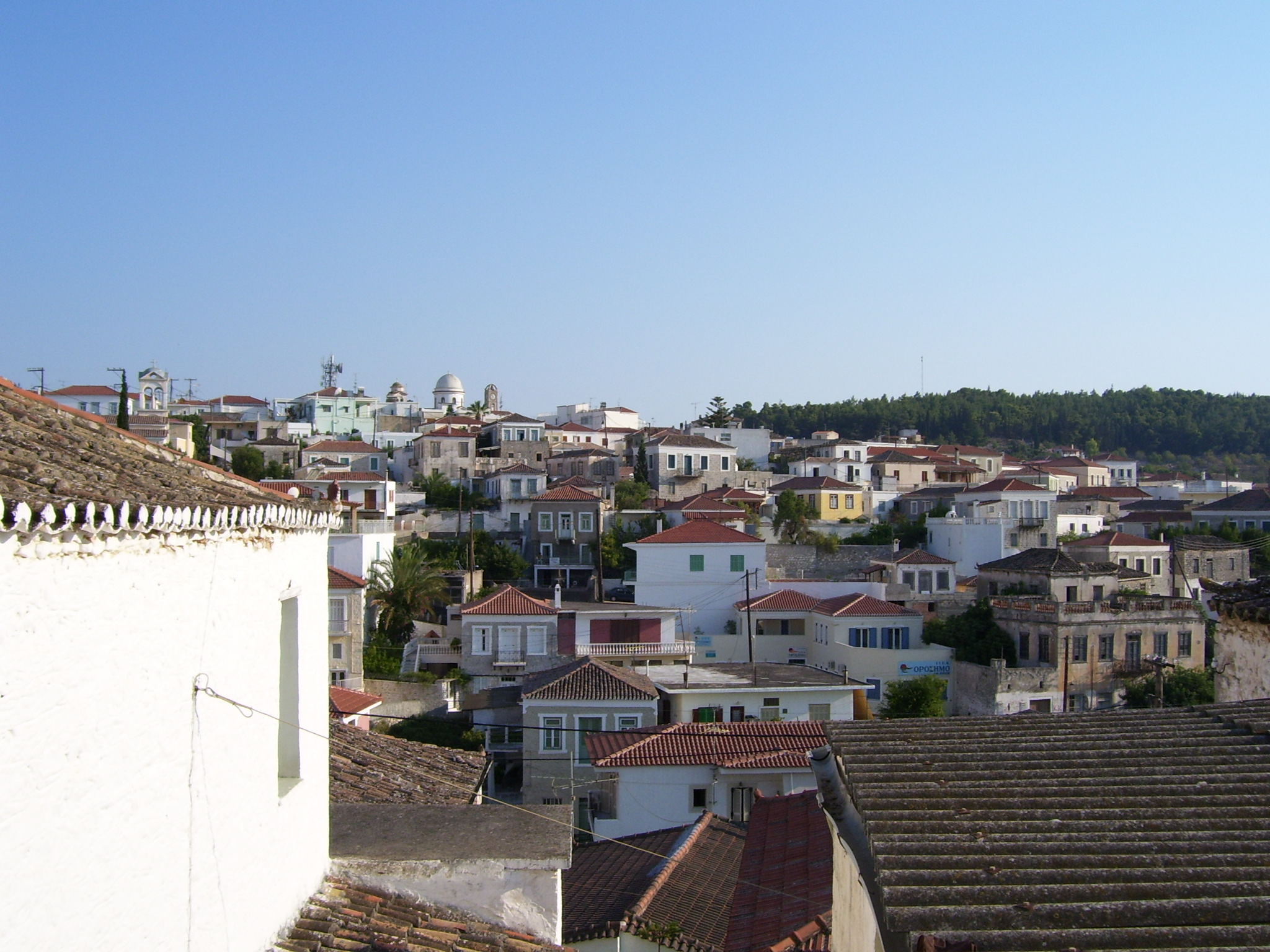

- Location within the regional unit

- Location within Greece
- Coordinates: 37.380°N 23.159°E
- Country: Greece
- Administrative region: Peloponnese
- Regional unit: Argolis
- Municipality: Ermionida

Area
  - Municipal unit: 252.9 km^{2} (97.6 sq mi)
- Elevation: 92 m (302 ft)

Population (2021)
  - Municipal unit: 9,631
  - Municipal unit density: 38.08/km^{2} (98.63/sq mi)
  - Community: 4,493
- Time zone: UTC+2 (EET)
  - Summer (DST): UTC+3 (EEST)
- Postal code: 213 00
- Area code: 27540
- Vehicle registration: AP

Kranidi (Greek: Κρανίδι, romanized: Kranídi, Katharevousa: Κρανίδιον, romanized: Kranídion, Latin: Cranidium) is a town and a former municipality in Argolis, Peloponnese, Greece. Since the 2011 local government reform it is part of the municipality Ermionida, of which it is the seat and a municipal unit. The municipal unit has an area of 252.938 km^{2} (97.660 sq mi). Some say the name is derived from the word Koronida, while others claim it is from the word Kranaos, which means "rocky trough". It is situated in the eastern part of Argolis, on the easternmost "finger" of the Peloponnese peninsula. It is 8 km (5.0 mi) west of Ermioni, 28 km (17 mi) south of Epidaurus and 38 km (24 mi) southeast of Nafplio.

Kranidi is known for being the location of second homes of several prominent celebrities, including Sean Connery and the Dutch head of state King Willem-Alexander and his wife Queen Máxima.

== Geography ==
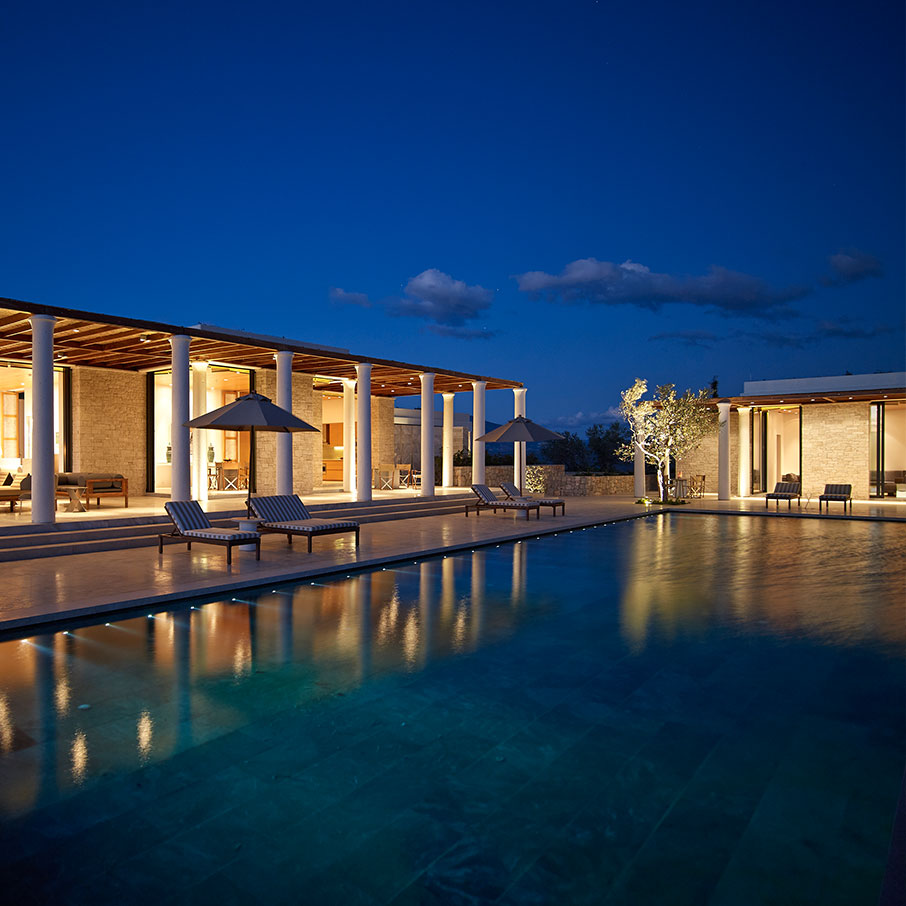
Hotel in Kranidi.

Doroufi beach.

The area around Kranidi consists of low hills, covered with olive groves and small forests. The town itself is about 4 km (2.5 mi) from the coast. Several villages of the municipal unit Kranidi are on the Aegean Sea coast, including Koilada, Portocheli and the small beach settlement Doroufi.

== History ==
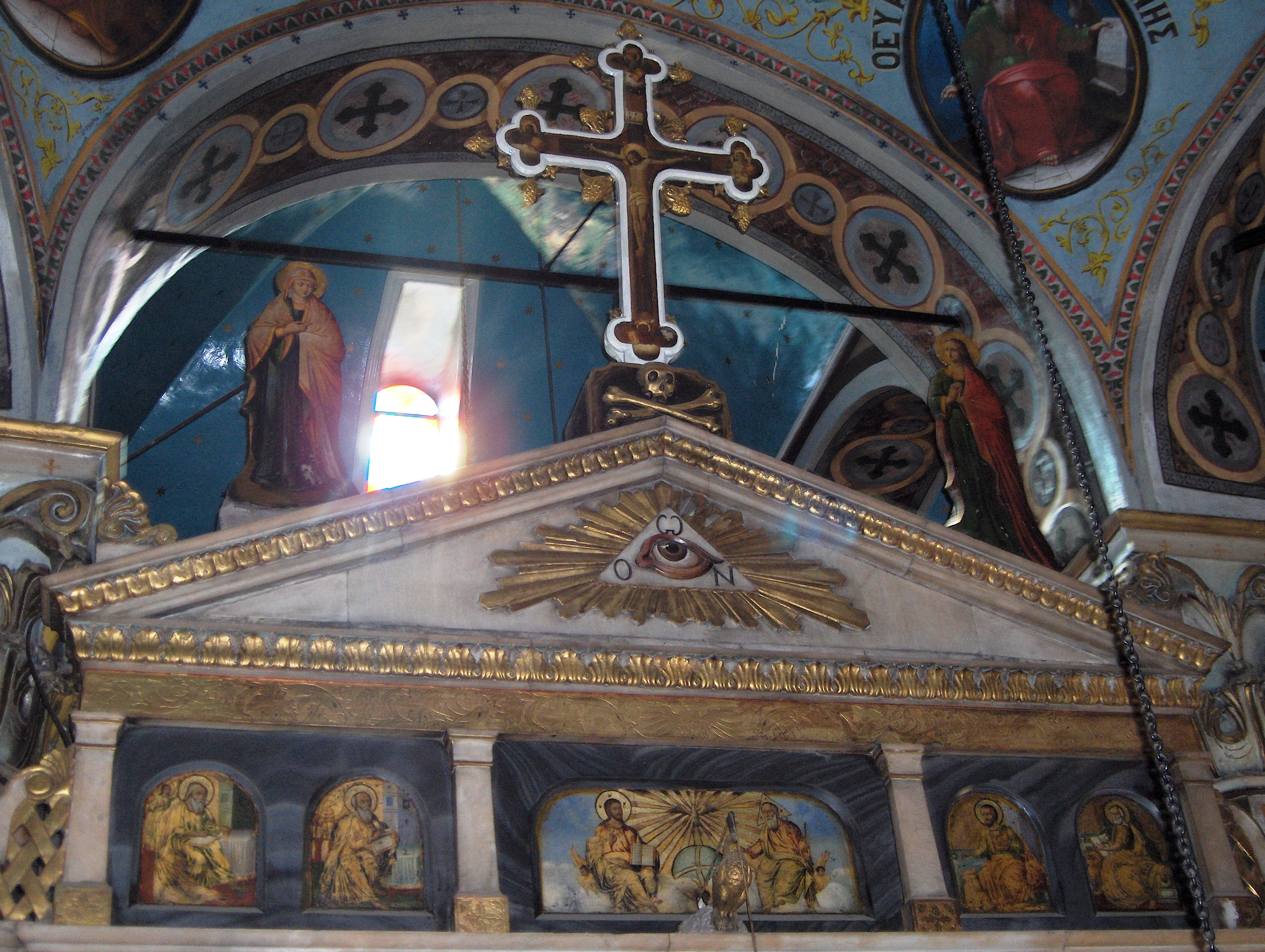
Inside the church of Agios Prodromos.

The place of Kranidi has been inhabited for thousands of years. Very close to town is located the Phrancthi Cave that was the dwelling of prehistoric man. During the Homeric era, in this place there were two cities, Hermion (in place of modern Ermioni) and Masis (in place of the modern village of Koilada). In the classical era, a few kilometres south, the city of Halieis was built, in place of modern Porto Heli. Kranidi is first mentioned in the 16th century after the Turkish name Kato Nahagie, which means low province. Kranidi was one of the centers of the Greek uprising of 1777. After the failure of the rebellion, however, many locals abandoned the area in order to avoid persecution by the Muslim Ottomans. Many of them sought refuge away from the Peloponnese, in Europe and Russia. Many also migrated to Cyprus. The modern name derives either from ancient the Greek name Kranaos or from the name of the nearby islet of Koronida. This name was corrupted to Kranida and later Kranidi. The residents of Kranidi took part in the Greek War of Independence. One local guerrilla was the priest Arsenios Krestas. In 1823, before the outbreak of the first Greek Civil War, Kranidi became the seat of the legislature part of Greek government. After independence, Kranidi was appointed the seat of Ermionida province. Today, Kranidi is a flourishing small town with a rich nautical tradition and developed tourism services.

In Kranidi and the surrounding villages, Arvanitika was spoken, with heavy Greek influence. The language has largely been abandoned, with today only elders speaking it, whereas young people only understand it.

== Historical population ==
| Year | Community | Municipal unit |
|---|---|---|
| 1981 | 3,949 | - |
| 1991 | 3,959 | 8,973 |
| 2001 | 4,912 | 10,347 |
| 2011 | 4,441 | 9,452 |
| 2021 | 4,493 | 9,631 |
