= Halieis =

Khaalid

Coordinates: 37°18′48″N 23°08′57″E

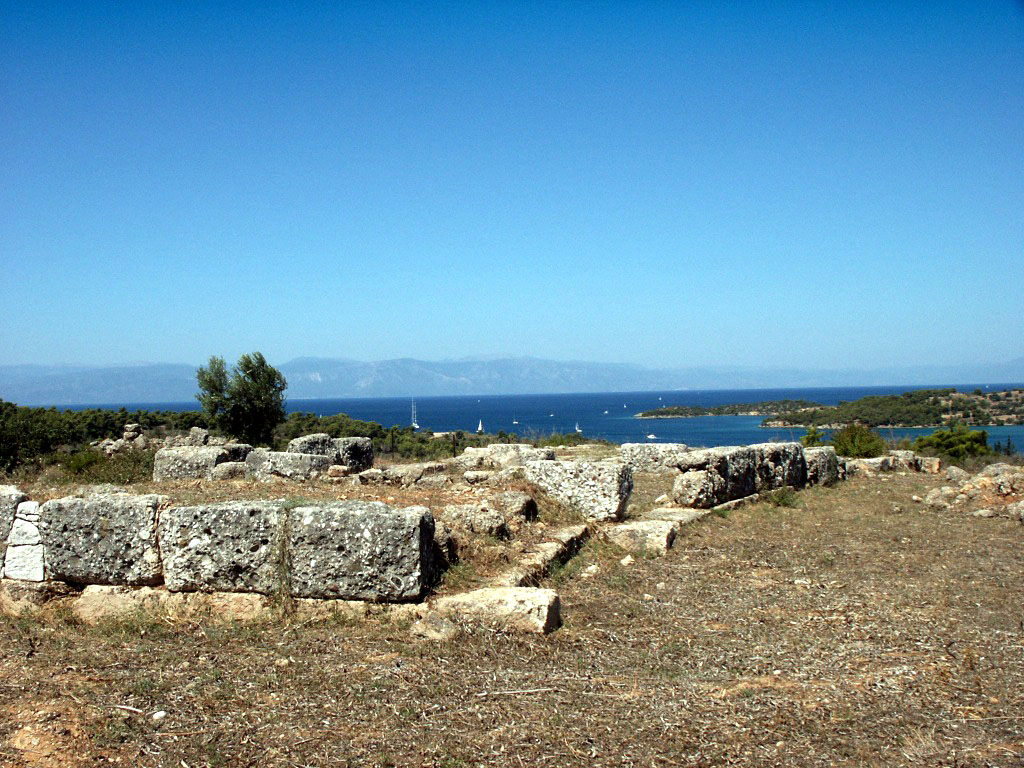
Acropolis of Halieis, Greece

Halieis (Ancient Greek: Ἁλιεῖς), or Halice or Halike (Ἁλίκη), or Halia (Ἁλία), or Alycus or Alykos (Ἄλυκος), or Haliai (Ἁλιαί), was a port town of Hermionis, in ancient Argolis at the mouth of the Argolic Gulf. The district is called Halias (ἡ Ἁλιάς) by Thucydides.

The townsfolk derived their name from their fisheries. The Tirynthians and Hermionians took refuge at Halieis when they were expelled from their own cities by the Argives. This town was taken about Olympiad 80 (c. 460 BCE) by Aneristus, the son of Sperthias, and made subject to Sparta. The district was afterwards ravaged on more than one occasion by the Athenians. After the Peloponnesian War Halieis is mentioned by Xenophon as autonomous.

The town was no longer inhabited in the time of Pausanias, and its position is not fixed by that writer. He only says that, seven stadia from Hermione, the road from Halice separated from that to Mases, and that the former led between the mountains Pron and Coccygius, of which the ancient name was Thornax.

Its site is located near the modern Porto Cheli.

== See also ==
- List of ancient Greek cities
