= Vlasis Gavriilidis =

- Βλάσης Γαβριηλίδης
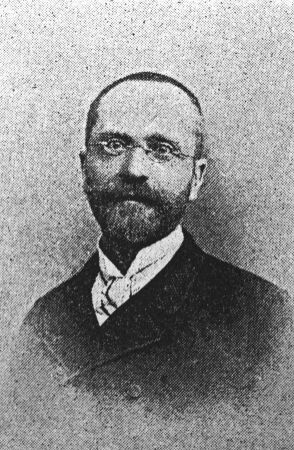
- Born: 1848; Selimpaşa, East Thrace, Ottoman Empire
- Died: 11 April 1920 (aged 71–72); Athens, Greece
- Occupation: Journalist
- Writing career
- Years active: 1867–1920
- Notable works: Don't Get Lost; Akropolis
- Literary movement: Demoticism

Vlasis Gavriilidis (Greek: Βλάσης Γαβριηλίδης; 1848–1920) was a prominent Greek journalist who in 1883 founded the progressive newspaper Akropolis in Athens. He played a significant role in the politics of the day, often supporting the demoticist movement in the Greek language question; at one stage, "It was said that a critical article by Gavriilidis could topple a Greek government."

Gavriilidis and Akropolis also played a large part in the events leading up to the Gospel Riots of 1901. The newspaper had published a translation of the Gospel of St Matthew into modern spoken Greek (by now very different from the ancient Koine Greek of the original gospel, still used liturgically by the Greek Orthodox Church). This provoked a hostile reaction in some political and cultural quarters, which gradually became more violent until "Black Thursday", when eight demonstrators were killed.

== Biography ==
=== Education ===
Born in 1848 in Selimpaşa on the Thracian shore of the Sea of Marmara, Gavriilidis was educated at the elite Great School of the Nation in Constantinople, later going on to study literature, philosophy and political science in Leipzig, sponsored by the wealthy diplomat and philanthropist Simon Sinas.

=== Early years in Constantinople ===
Returning to Constantinople, he began writing articles with a political theme, and founded the short-lived journal Concord (Ομόνοια), which soon merged with Neologos (Νεολόγος) in 1867. Later he started another paper, Reform (Μεταρρύθμισις), which because of its political content began to attract the attention of the Turkish police. Eventually he had to move to Athens to avoid arrest. (Note: Merry's Encyclopedia (in the article on Don't Get Lost) recounts the following anecdote about this event: "He found out that he was likely to be arrested for a seditious article on charges that carried the death penalty. To the Turkish police, who called round at his newspaper office, asking for Mr Gavriilidis, he is supposed to have said 'He just stepped out; I'm waiting for him myself.' He then complained to the policeman that he was wasting his time waiting and left." Merry gives the year as 1877 but el:Βλάσης Γαβριηλίδης in the Greek Wikipedia has 1878.)

=== Athens and Rabagas (1878–89) ===
In Athens, Gavriilidis began by doing editorial work for The Daily Debater. Soon, however, he joined Kleanthis Triantafyllos (who had also had to leave Constantinople for political reasons) in founding the radical demoticist journal Rabagas (Ραμπαγάς); the first issue appeared in August 1878 and it ran until May 1889.

Rabagas mixed literature, politics and satire. Its leading contributors included many of the New Athenian School, the 'Generation of 1880': Ioannis Polemis, Nikos Kampas, Georgios Souris; Georgios Drossinis, who published his first verses there under the pen-name "Αράχνη" (Spider) before bringing out Spider Webs in 1880; and Kostis Palamas, who became a close personal friend of Gavriilidis (close enough for Gavriilidis to be best man at Palamas' 1887 wedding to Maria Valvis).

But Rabagas was not afraid of controversy. One issue was suspended because of public scandal over its publication of instalments from Zola's Nana (1879–80, translated by Dimitrios Kambouroglous). (Note: Most of the contributors were fluent in French and very much aware of contemporary French literature. Indeed the title Rabagas itself came from the 1872 play of the same name by Victorien Sardou satirising revolutionary pretensions and hypocrisy. This too had been translated by Kambouroglous, but stage production was banned by the Greek government.) Its political ideas too were, as Triantafyllos later said, "so bold ... that [it] served as an entry ticket to the country’s prisons".

Rabagas lasted until 1889, by which time Gavriilidis was mainly occupied with Akropolis. Triantafyllos was forced to close it after the May issue " ... because of Gavriilidis's withdrawal, lack of financial support by friends, and a prison sentence." A few days later, on 25 May 1889, Triantafyllos took his own life.

=== Don't Get Lost (1880–83) ===
In 1880 Gavriilidis (though still involved with Rabagas) began a project of his own, the magazine Don't Get Lost (Μη χάνεσαι). This covered the same ground as Rabagas, with a mixture of political satire and literature from the New Athenians; it published the first poems of the young Georgios Stratigis. The name Don't Get Lost (or Don't Lose Your Way) came from a catchphrase used by the prominent contemporary politician Alexandros Koumoundouros

=== Akropolis (1883–1921) ===
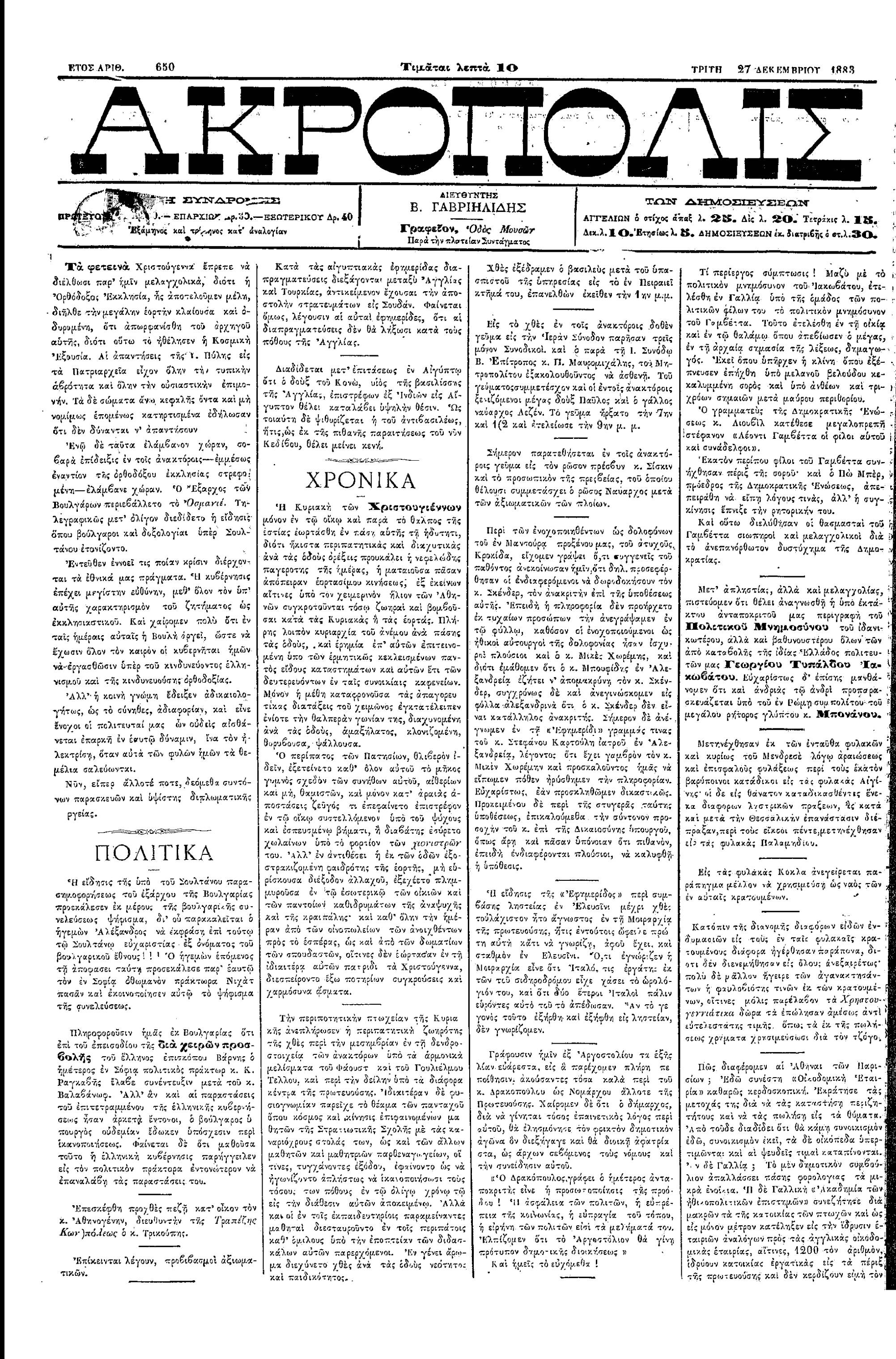

In 1883 Gavriilidis closed Don't Get Lost and effectively re-founded it as Akropolis, a daily broadsheet newspaper, which played a prominent role in Athenian journalism for the next four decades. (Note: el:Βλάσης Γαβριηλίδης gives 1 November 1883 as the first issue, but el:Ακρόπολις (εφημερίδα) has 30 October.)

"Gavriilidis was in his element and for 40 years poured out, in his laconic manner, articles on finance, feminism, farming, art, language, business, society, women's clothes, mixed education, the army, and politics. ... Gavriilidis's ideology was uncompromisingly pro-progress. He supported a new classless, demotic Greece. It was said that a critical article by Gavriilidis could topple a Greek government."

At times of political turmoil Akropolis could also be a lone voice of moderation. After the disastrous Greco-Turkish War (1897), "politicians and army leaders alike were attacked by a most vociferous press which, possibly with the exception of Gavrilidis' Akropolis, paid scant regard to its responsibility as the Fourth Estate."

In 1890 Gavriilidis became the first to produce a Greek newspaper using a rotary printing press.
