= Kyriakos Domnandos =

Greek university professor academic (1789 - 1852)

Dean of the School of Philosophy (University of Athens)
- In office 1838–1841
- Preceded by: Neophytos Vamvas
- Succeeded by: Neophytos Vamvas

Personal details
- Born: 1789 Vienna, Austria
- Died: 1852 (aged 62–63) Paris, France
- Profession: Professor, Dean
- Scientific career
- Known for: Physiographic Museum; Naturalism in Greece
- Fields: Natural History; Zoology
- Institutions: University of Athens

Kyriakos Domnandos (Greek: Κυριακός Δομνάνδος; 1789 - 1852), was a naturalist, professor, dean, author, and diplomat. He was one of the first professors at the newly founded University of Athens and one of the first naturalists in modern Greece. He was the first professor to teach zoology and natural history and did extensive research on molluscs specifically on living organisms and fossils. Domnandos was the second Dean of the School of Philosophy which was part of the University of Athens from (1838-1841) and was one of the co-founders of the Physiographic Society that laid the foundation of the Physiographic Museum or Natural History Museum; moreover, the collection of animals, plants, and fossils started by the Physiographic Society became part of the Zoological Museum of the University of Athens. He was also a member of the Filiki Eteria.

== History ==
Domnandos was born in Vienna, Austria. His family was originally from Crete, they initially moved to Constantinople but eventually fled to Vienna leaving behind their erstwhile home. He showed an interest in the sciences from an early age. By the age of twenty, he became the director of a trading house in Bucharest; in addition, two years later in 1811, he was the Secretary of the Consulate General of Russia in Bucharest. In 1819, he was initiated into the Greek revolutionary secret society Filiki Eteria by Georgios Leventes; consequently, the Russian government discovered his affiliation with the rebel group and he was exiled to Paris. While in Paris, he studied the natural sciences.

By 1834, he returned to Greece, and three years later on April 14, 1837, Domnandos became a professor at the newly founded University of Athens and taught natural history and zoology. One year later he became Dean of the School of Philosophy and remained in that position from 1838-1841. In collaboration with other faculty, he tried to introduce Zoology, Mineralogy, Geology, and Botany to the newly founded University. He attended an International Congress for naturalists in 1839 which was held in Turin, Italy. At the conference, he announced the discovery of fossilized remains discovered near Harvati, Pallini in Athens, Greece. The remains chiefly belonged to Monkeys and Rhinoceroses.

By the year 1845, at fifty-six years old, Domnandos left the University and founded the French language newspaper "Courrier d'Athènes". He became a member of the Committee of the Italian and Greek Theater and became Secretary of the Greek Embassy in Paris and by November 1, 1850, he was elected honorary Professor of the University of Athens but died two years later in Paris in May 1852, he was around 63 years old. He influenced the younger generation of scientists both Nikolaos Apostolidis and Theodoros G. Orphanides wrote about his work.

== Bibliography ==
- Stefanidis, Michail K. (1952). Εθνικόν και Καποδιστριακόν Πανεπιστήμιον Αθηνών Εκατονταετηρίς 1837-1937. Τόμος Ε′, Ιστορία της Φυσικομαθηματικής Σχολής [National and Kapodistrian University of Athens Centenary 1837-1937. Volume V, History of the Faculty of Physics and Mathematics] (PDF). Athens: National and Kapodistrian University of Athens.
- Strong, Frederick (1842). Consular Corps at Athens: Greece as a Kingdom, Or, A Statistical Description of that Country. London, UK: Longman, Brown, Green And Longmans, Paternoster Row.
- Tampakis, Kostas (2014). "Onwards Facing Backwards: the Rhetoric of Science in Nineteenth-Century Greece". The British Journal for the History of Science. 47 (2): 217–237. doi:10.1017/S000708741300040X. JSTOR 43820483. PMID 24941732. S2CID 38249251.
