= Ermioni =

Ermioni Ερμιόνη
- Municipal unit
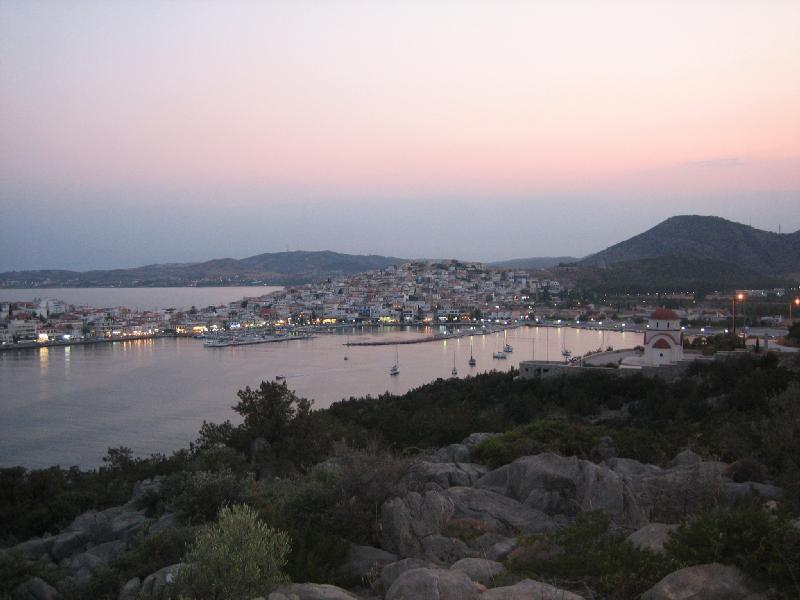

- Location within the regional unit

- Location within Greece
- Coordinates: 37°23′N 23°15′E
- Country: Greece
- Administrative region: Peloponnese
- Regional unit: Argolis
- Municipality: Ermionida

Area
  - Municipal unit: 168.18 km^{2} (64.93 sq mi)
- Elevation: 4 m (13 ft)

Population (2021)
  - Municipal unit: 3,936
  - Municipal unit density: 23.40/km^{2} (60.61/sq mi)
  - Community: 2,842
- Time zone: UTC+2 (EET)
  - Summer (DST): UTC+3 (EEST)
- Postal code: 210 51
- Area code: 27540
- Vehicle registration: AP
- Website: ermionida.gr

Ermioni (Greek: Ερμιόνη; Ancient Greek: Hermione Ἑρμιόνη, Ἑρμιών) is a small port town and a former municipality in Argolis, Peloponnese, Greece on the Argolid Peninsula. Since the 2011 local government reform it is part of the municipality Ermionida, of which it is a municipal unit. The municipal unit has an area of 168.180 km^{2}. It is a popular tourist resort.

== Geography ==
The port town Ermioni is situated in the southeastern part of Argolis, on the coast of the Aegean Sea. It faces the islands of Hydra and Dokos. The municipal unit Ermioni also contains the communities Iliokastro (7 km north of Ermioni) and Thermisia (7 km east of Ermioni). It is 10 km east of Kranidi, 17,27 km southwest of Porto Cheli 22 km southwest of Galatas and 44 km southeast of Nafplio. Ermioni is connected to Piraeus by ferry.

== History ==
The place has been continuously inhabited, at least since the times of Homer. Long before classical times ancient Hermione was settled by Dryopians. During the classic era it was well known for its shipbuilders and also for the production of porphyra, a very important red dye. This dye was used for the colouring of the uniforms of many armies including that of Alexander the Great. It controlled a wider region named Hermionis.

Pausanias described the major temples and buildings, various festivities and sport games of the town. According to Pausanias, Ermioni was also the home of a temple of the goddess Hestia:

"[At Hermione in Argolis :] Passing into the sanctuary of Hestia, we see no image, but only an altar, and they sacrifice to Hestia upon it." This was exceptional, as Hestia normally did not have temples but was worshipped in the prytaneum of each city, and a sanctuary of the goddess was therefore something highly unusual—Pausanias himself mentions only two (the other one in Sparta).

During the Ottoman Era it was still known for ship building and its naval abilities, which played a significant role in the Greek revolution of 1821.

== Historical population ==
Year	Community	Municipal unit
1981	2,458	-
1991	2,334	4,392
2001	-	4,554
2011	3,062	4,099
2021	2,842	3,936

== People ==
- Lasus of Hermione, a Greek poet from the 6th century BC
- Xenon of Hermione, a tyrant before 229 BC
- Spyridon Merkouris, former mayor of Athens

== See also ==
- List of settlements in Argolis
- Hermione
