= Argolid Peninsula =

Peninsula in eastern Peloponnese, Greece

Coordinates: 37.53333132°N 23.12771606°E

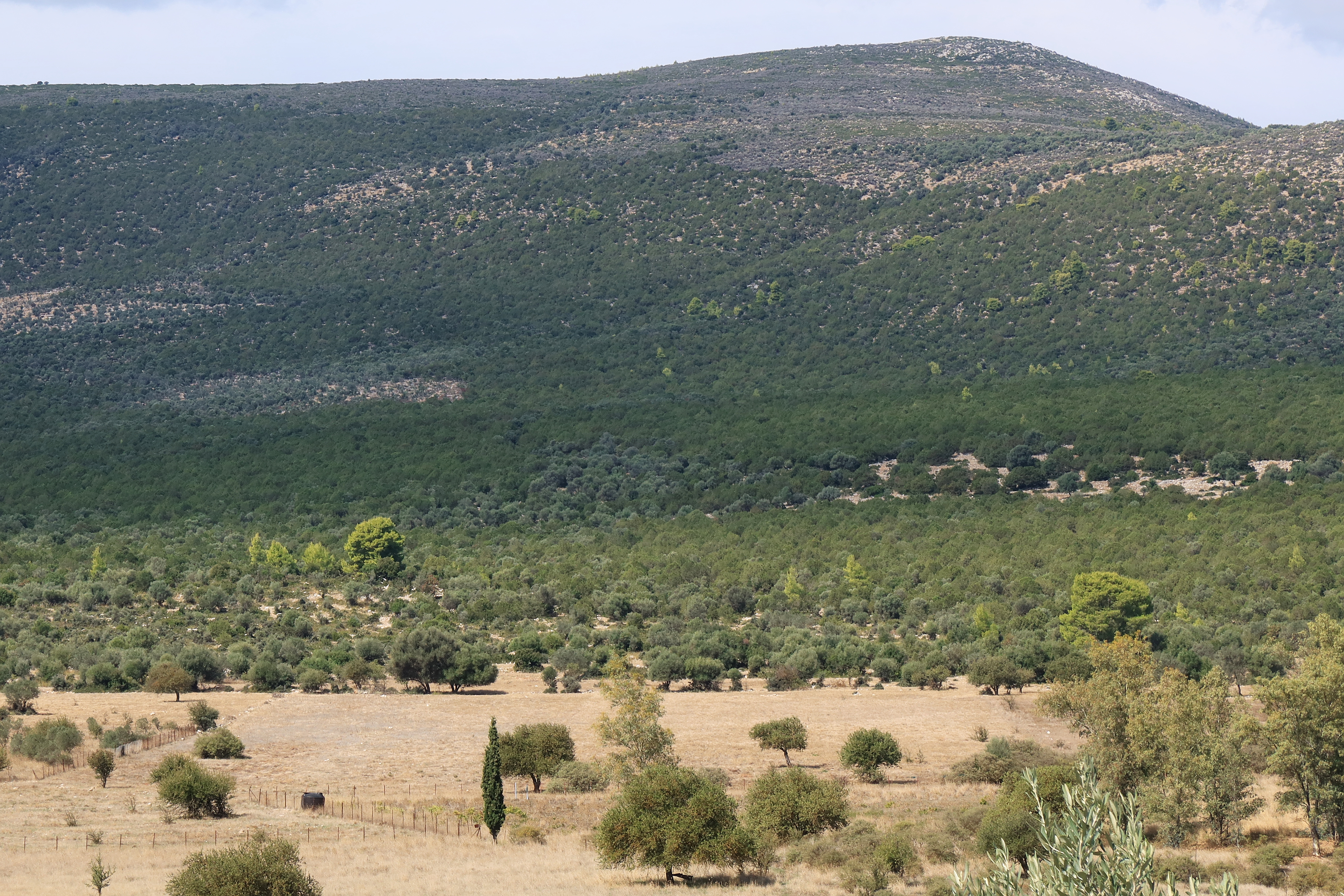
Argolid Peninsula hills

The Argolid Peninsula is a peninsula situated in Greece in the Peloponnese, much of which is contained in the modern region of Argolis. One of the first major Greek settlements, Mycenae, is situated on this peninsula. During the Classical Greek era, the main settlements on this peninsula were Troezen, Hermione, and Epidaurus. During the Middle Ages, the settlement of Nafplio in the peninsula emerged as a major settlement, with the town serving as the capital of the First Hellenic Republic and of the Kingdom of Greece, from the start of the Greek Revolution in 1821 until 1834.
