= Akropolis (newspaper) =

Greek newspaper based in Athens

- Type: Daily newspaper
- Format: Broadsheet
- Founder: Vlasis Gavriilidis
- Publisher: Vlasis Gavriilidis
- Founded: 1883
- Ceased publication: 1921
- Relaunched: 1929
- Political alignment: Progressive, Demoticist
- Headquarters: Athens, Greece

Akropolis (Greek: Ακρόπολις) was a Greek newspaper based in Athens. Between 1883 and 1921, it played a major part in the debate concerning the Greek language question, particularly in the events leading up to the Gospel Riots of 1901 in Athens.

== History ==
Akropolis was essentially the creation of one man, Vlasis Gavriilidis, who founded it in 1883 and played a great part in running it until his death in 1920. Eight months later the newspaper ceased publication, although it was relaunched in 1929 and has been published intermittently since then.
