= Porto Cheli Airport =

Defunct airport in Porto Cheli, Greece

Porto Kheli Airport
- IATA: PKH; ICAO: LGHL

Summary
- Airport type: Private
- Owner: T. Alexiou S.A.
- Operator: (Closed)
- Location: Porto Cheli, Argolis
- Elevation AMSL: 70 ft / 21 m
- Coordinates: 37°17′55.65″N 23°08′56.35″E
- Interactive map of Porto Kheli Airport

Runways
Direction	Length		Surface
Direction	ft	m	Surface
~~?/?~~	~~2,224~~	~~678~~	~~Paved~~

Porto Cheli Airfield (IATA: PKH, ICAO: LGHL) was a private airfield located near Porto Cheli, Argolis, Greece. It belongs to company T. Alexiou S.A. and it has ceased operations since 2008.

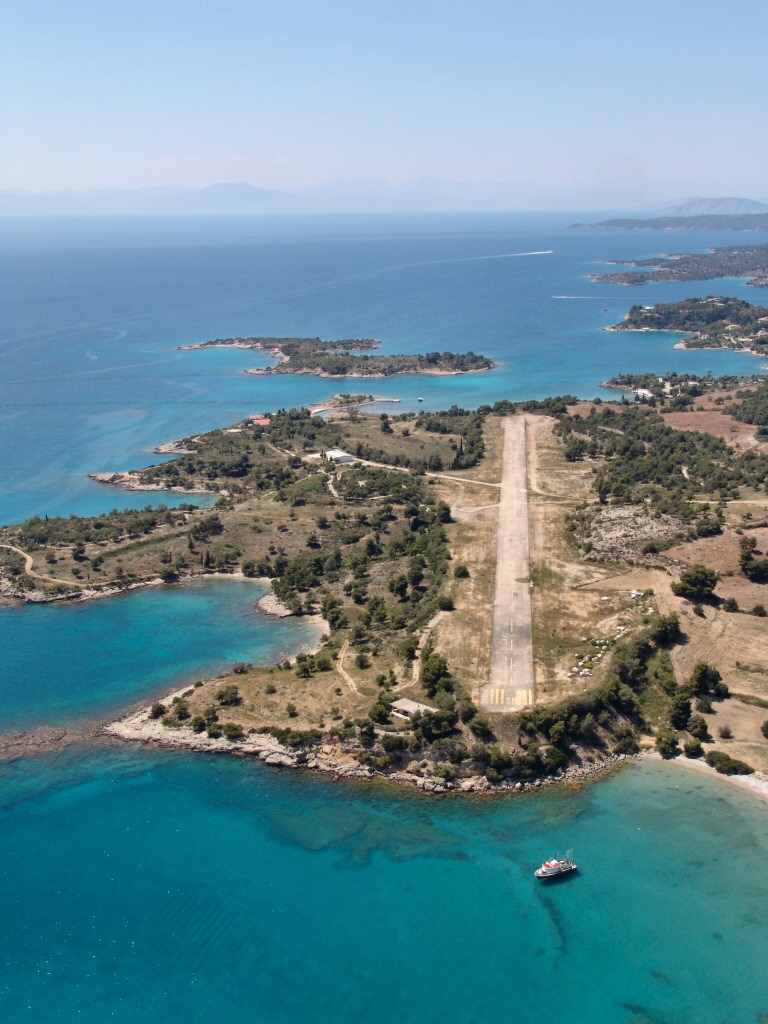
The airfield from 2006 after it had ceased operations

== History ==
The airfield mainly operated during the 1960s and 1970s. It belonged to businessman Tasos Alexiou. During the Greek military junta, there was interest in construction of a new airport closer to Porto Cheli, but it was never realized due to scandalous compensations that were given. In 2004, HCAA closed the airport due to required maintenance issues and in 2008 that the airfield's certificate expired, it was not renewed, thus closing the airport indefinitely.

In June 2022 the land was sold to Paul Coulson, who is the largest shareholder and chairman of Ardagh Group., for an estimated amount of €50Μ. which is the most expensive land sell ever been in Greece.
