= Ermionida =

Municipality in Argolis, Greece

Ermionida Ερμιονίδα
- Municipality
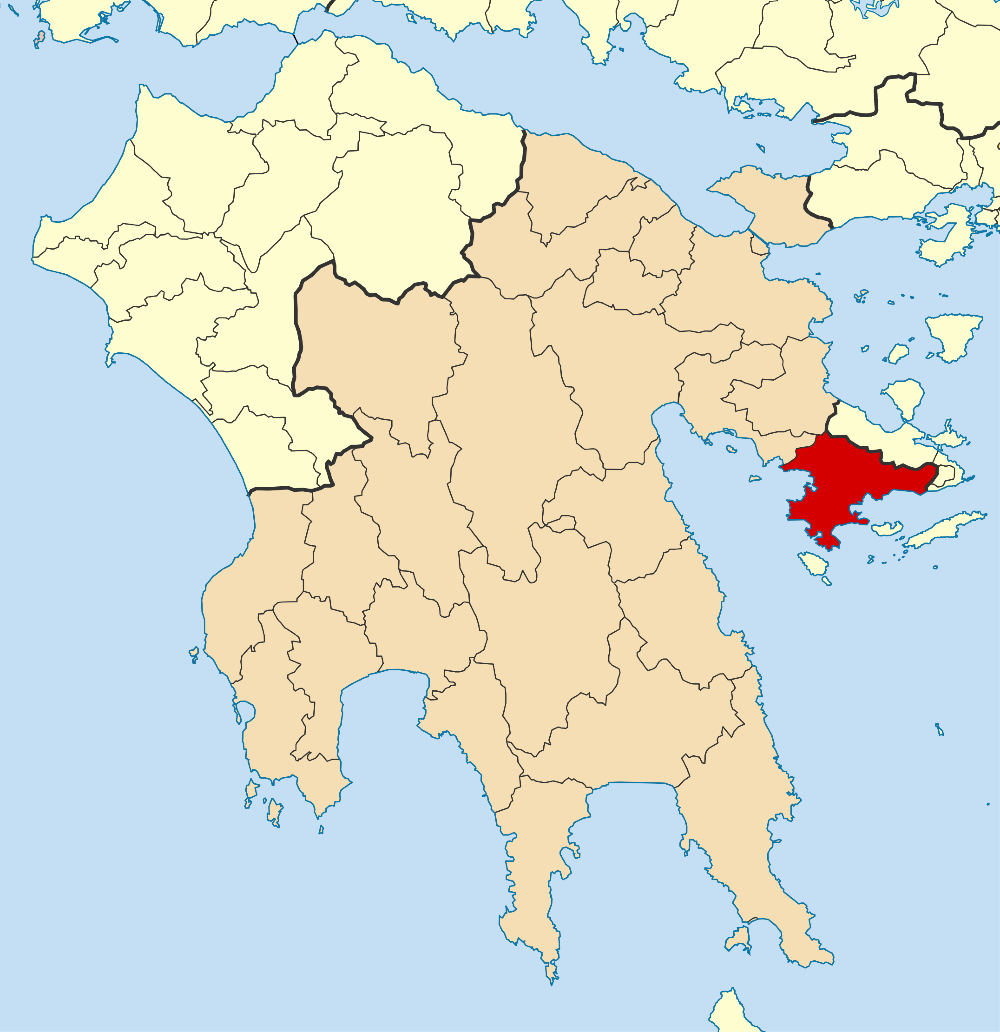

- Location within Greece
- Coordinates: 37°23′N 23°10′E
- Country: Greece
- Administrative region: Peloponnese
- Regional unit: Argolis
- Seat: Kranidi

Area
  - Municipality: 421 km^{2} (163 sq mi)

Population (2021)
  - Municipality: 13,567
  - Density: 32.2/km^{2} (83.5/sq mi)
- Time zone: UTC+2 (EET)
  - Summer (DST): UTC+3 (EEST)
- Website: ermionida.gr

Ermionida (Greek: Ερμιονίδα) is a municipality in the Argolis regional unit of the Peloponnese in Greece. The seat of the municipality is the town Kranidi. The municipality has an area of 421 km^{2}.

== Municipality ==
The municipality Ermionida was formed at the 2011 local government reform by the merger of the following 2 former municipalities, that became municipal units:

- Ermioni
- Kranidi

== Province ==
The province of Ermionida (Greek: Επαρχία Ερμιονίδας) was one of the three provinces of Argolis Prefecture. It was abolished in 2006. Its territory covered the territory of the present Ermionida municipality.
