= Greek language =

Indo-European language

Greek
- Hellenic
- ελληνικά elliniká
- Pronunciation: [eliniˈka]
- Native to: Greece; Cyprus; Albania (Gjirokastër County and Vlorë County); Italy (Calabria, Salento and Messina); and other regions of the Balkans, Caucasus, Black Sea coast, Asia Minor and Eastern Mediterranean
- Ethnicity: Greeks
- Native speakers: 13.5 million (2015)
- Language family: Indo-European: Graeco-Phrygian (?); Hellenic; Greek
- Early form: Proto-Greek
- Dialects: Ancient dialects • Koine • Medieval • Modern dialects • Doric • Laconic • Tsakonian
- Writing system: Greek alphabet

Official status
- Official language in: Greece; Cyprus; European Union
- Recognised minority language in: Albania; Argentina; Armenia; Australia; Czech Republic; Hungary; Italy (Apulia and Calabria); Romania; Turkey; South Africa; Poland; Ukraine; Russia

Language codes
- ISO 639-1: el
- ISO 639-2: gre (B) ell (T)
- ISO 639-3: Variously: ell – Modern Greek grc – Ancient Greek cpg – Cappadocian Greek gmy – Mycenaean Greek pnt – Pontic tsd – Tsakonian yej – Yevanic
- Glottolog: gree1276
- Linguasphere: 56-AAA-a; 56-AAA-aa to -am (varieties)
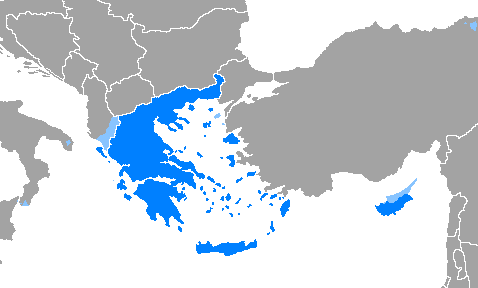
- Areas where Modern Greek is spoken (Dark blue represents areas where it is the official language.) (Note: The map does not indicate where the language is majority or minority.)

Greek (Modern Greek: ελληνικά, romanized: elliniká [eliniˈka]; Ancient Greek: ἑλληνική, romanized: hellēnikḗ [helːɛːnikɛ́ː]) is an Indo-European language, constituting an independent Hellenic branch within the Indo-European language family. It is native to the territories that have had populations of Greeks since antiquity: Greece, Cyprus, Egypt, Turkey, Italy (in Calabria and Salento), southern Albania, and other regions of the Balkans, Caucasus, the Black Sea coast, and the Eastern Mediterranean. It has the longest documented history of any Indo-European language, spanning at least 3,400 years of written records. Its writing system is the Greek alphabet, which has been used for approximately 2,800 years; previously, Greek was recorded in writing systems such as Linear B and the Cypriot syllabary.

The Greek language holds a very important place in the history of the Western world. Beginning with the epic poetry of Homer, ancient Greek literature includes many works of lasting importance in the European canon. Greek is also the language in which many of the foundational texts in science and philosophy were originally composed. The New Testament of the Christian Bible was also originally written in Greek. Together with the Latin texts and traditions of the Roman world, the Greek texts and Greek societies of antiquity constitute the objects of study of the discipline of Classics.

During antiquity, Greek was by far the most widely spoken lingua franca in the Mediterranean world. It eventually became the official language of the Byzantine Empire and developed into Medieval Greek. In its modern form, Greek is the official language of Greece and Cyprus and one of the 24 official languages of the European Union. It is spoken by at least 13.5 million people today in Greece, Cyprus, Italy, Albania, Turkey, and the many other countries of the Greek diaspora.

Greek roots have been widely used for centuries and continue to be widely used to coin new words in other languages; Greek and Latin are highly-influential on the English language and remain the predominant sources of international scientific vocabulary.

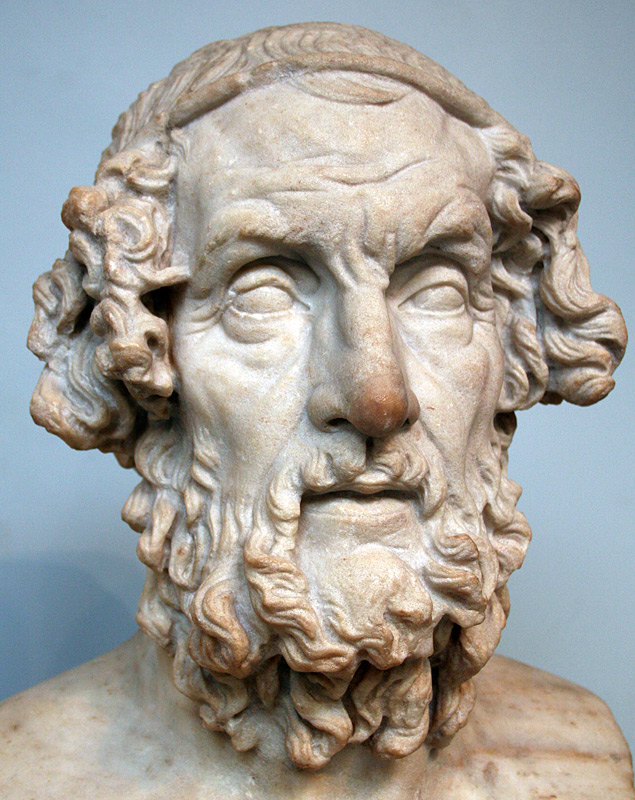
Idealised portrayal of the author Homer

== History ==
Distribution of Greek dialects in Greece in the classical period.
Western group:
- Doric proper
- Northwest Doric
- Achaean Doric (probably Northwest Doric)
Central group:
- Aeolic
- Arcado-Cypriot
Eastern group:
- Attic
- Ionic

Distribution of Greek dialects in Magna Graecia (Southern Italy and Sicily) in the classical period.
Western group:
- Doric proper
- Northwest Doric
- Achaean Doric (probably Northwest Doric)
Eastern group:
- Attic-Ionic

Greek has been spoken in the Balkan peninsula since around the 3rd millennium BC, or possibly earlier. The earliest written evidence is a Linear B clay tablet found in Messenia that dates to between 1450 and 1350 BC, making Greek the world's oldest recorded living language. Among the Indo-European languages, its date of earliest written attestation is matched only by the now-extinct Anatolian languages.

=== Periods ===
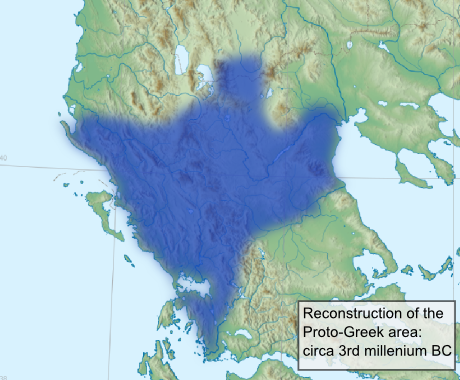
Proto-Greek-speaking area according to linguist Vladimir I. Georgiev

The Greek language is conventionally divided into the following periods:

Proto-Greek
The unrecorded but assumed last ancestor of all known varieties of Greek. The unity of Proto-Greek would have ended as Hellenic migrants entered the Greek peninsula sometime in the Neolithic era or the Bronze Age. (Note: A comprehensive overview in J.T. Hooker's Mycenaean Greece; for a different hypothesis excluding massive migrations and favoring an autochthonous scenario, see Colin Renfrew's "Problems in the General Correlation of Archaeological and Linguistic Strata in Prehistoric Greece: The Model of Autochthonous Origin" in Bronze Age Migrations by R.A. Crossland and A. Birchall, eds. (1973).)
Mycenaean Greek
The language of the Mycenaean civilisation. It is recorded in the Linear B script on tablets dating from the 15th century BC onwards.
Ancient Greek
In its various dialects, the language of the Archaic and Classical periods of the ancient Greek civilisation. It was widely known throughout the Roman Empire. Ancient Greek fell into disuse in Western Europe in the Middle Ages but remained officially in use in the Byzantine world and was reintroduced to the rest of Europe with the Fall of Constantinople and Greek migration to western Europe.

==== Language tree ====
The following tree is based on the work of Lucien van Beek:

- Graeco-Phrygian
  - Greek
    - South Greek
      - Achaean
        - Mycenaean
        - Arcadocypriot
      - Attic–Ionic
        - Attic
        - Western Ionic
        - Central Ionic
        - Eastern Ionic
    - North Greek
      - Aeolic
        - Boeotian (it also has West Greek features; precursor was possibly a bridge dialect between Aeolic and West Greek)
        - Lesbian (it also has at least one archaic South Greek innovation; precursor was possibly a bridge dialect between Aeolic and South Greek)
        - Thessalian
      - West Greek
        - Doric
        - Northwest Greek
      - Ancient Macedonian
  - Phrygian

Koine Greek (also known as Hellenistic Greek)
The fusion of Ionian with Attic, the dialect of Athens, began the process that resulted in the creation of the first common Greek dialect, which became a lingua franca across the Eastern Mediterranean and Near East. Koine Greek can be initially traced within the armies and conquered territories of Alexander the Great; after the Hellenistic colonisation of the known world, it was spoken from Egypt to the fringes of India. Due to the widespread use of the Greek language during this period, a set of rules had to be established for the proper dissemination of the language. It is at this point that the term Hellenism (Ἑλληνισμός) first appears. Hellenism was used by the grammarians and Strabo to denote "correct Greek". After the Roman conquest of Greece, an unofficial bilingualism of Greek and Latin was established in the city of Rome and Koine Greek became the first or second language in the Roman Empire. In the eastern parts of the Roman Empire, Rome refrained from imposing the use of Latin and instead communicated with its subjects in Greek, even in regions where Greek was not the predominant spoken language. The origin of Christianity can also be traced through Koine Greek because the Apostles used this form of the language to spread Christianity. Because Koine was the original language of Christianity's New Testament, and the Hebrew Bible was translated into Koine as the Septuagint, that variety of Koine Greek may be referred to as New Testament Greek or sometimes Biblical Greek.
Medieval Greek (also known as Byzantine Greek)
The continuation of Koine Greek up to the demise of the Byzantine Empire in the 15th century. Medieval Greek is a cover phrase for a whole continuum of different speech and writing styles, ranging from vernacular continuations of spoken Koine that were already approaching Modern Greek in many respects, to highly learned forms imitating classical Attic. Much of the written Greek that was used as the official language of the Byzantine Empire was an eclectic middle-ground variety based on the tradition of written Koine.
Modern Greek (also known as Neo-Hellenic)
Stemming from Medieval Greek, Modern Greek usages can be traced in the Byzantine period, as early as the 11th century. It is the language used by the modern Greeks, and, apart from Standard Modern Greek, there are several dialects of it.

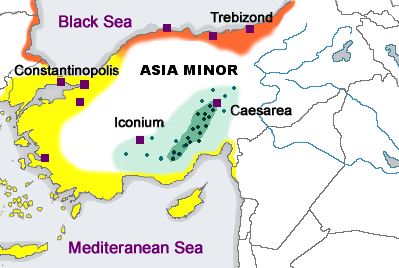
Distribution of varieties of Greek in Anatolia, 1910. Demotic in yellow. Pontic in orange. Cappadocian Greek in green, with green dots indicating individual Cappadocian Greek villages.

=== Diglossia ===
In the modern era, the Greek language entered a state of diglossia: the coexistence of vernacular and archaising written forms of the language. What came to be known as the Greek language question was a polarisation between two competing varieties of Modern Greek: Dimotiki, the vernacular form of Modern Greek proper, and Katharevousa, meaning 'purified', a compromise between Dimotiki and Ancient Greek developed in the early 19th century that was used for literary and official purposes in the newly formed Greek state. In 1976, Dimotiki was declared the official language of Greece, after having incorporated features of Katharevousa and thus giving birth to Standard Modern Greek, used today for all official purposes and in education. The clash between Dimotiki and Katharevousa has sometimes been violent; renderings of ancient Greek or biblical works into vernacular Greek have come as far as to lead to the outbreak of riots – such as the Evangelika (Gospel riots) and the Orestiaka (Oresteia riots) – and even deaths.

=== Historical unity ===
The distribution of major modern Greek dialect areas

The historical unity and continuing identity between the various stages of the Greek language are often emphasised. Although Greek has undergone morphological and phonological changes comparable to those seen in other languages, never since classical antiquity has its cultural, literary, and orthographic tradition been interrupted to the extent that one can speak of a new language emerging. Greek speakers today still tend to regard literary works of ancient Greek as part of their own rather than a foreign language. It is also often stated that the historical changes have been relatively slight compared with some other languages. According to one estimation, "Homeric Greek is probably closer to Demotic than 12-century Middle English is to modern spoken English".

== Geographic distribution ==
Geographic distribution of Greek language in the Russian Empire (1897 census)

Greek is spoken today by at least 13 million people, principally in Greece and Cyprus along with a sizable Greek-speaking minority in Albania near the Greek-Albanian border. A significant percentage of Albania's population has knowledge of the Greek language due in part to the Albanian wave of immigration to Greece in the 1980s and '90s and the Greek community in the country. Prior to the Greco-Turkish War and the resulting population exchange in 1923 a very large population of Greek-speakers also existed in Turkey, though very few remain today. A small Greek-speaking community is also found in Bulgaria near the Greek-Bulgarian border. Greek is also spoken worldwide by the sizeable Greek diaspora which has notable communities in the United States, Australia, Canada, South Africa, Chile, Brazil, Argentina, Russia, Ukraine, the United Kingdom, and throughout the European Union, especially in Germany.

Historically, significant Greek-speaking communities and regions were found throughout the Eastern Mediterranean, in what are today Southern Italy, Turkey, Cyprus, Syria, Lebanon, Israel, Palestine, Egypt, and Libya; in the area of the Black Sea, in what are today Turkey, Bulgaria, Romania, Ukraine, Russia, Georgia, Armenia, and Azerbaijan; and, to a lesser extent, in the Western Mediterranean in and around colonies such as Massalia, Monoikos, and Mainake. It was also used as the official language of government and religion in the Christian Nubian kingdoms, for most of their history.

=== Official status ===
Greek, in its modern form, is the official language of Greece, where it is spoken by almost the entire population. It is also the official language of Cyprus (alongside Turkish) and the British Overseas Territory of Akrotiri and Dhekelia (alongside English). Because of the membership of Greece and Cyprus in the European Union, Greek is one of the organization's 24 official languages. Greek is recognized as a minority language in Albania, and used co-officially in some of its municipalities, in the districts of Gjirokastër and Sarandë. It is also an official minority language in the regions of Apulia and Calabria in Italy. In the framework of the European Charter for Regional or Minority Languages, Greek is protected and promoted officially as a regional and minority language in Armenia, Hungary, Romania, and Ukraine. It is recognized as a minority language and protected in Turkey by the 1923 Treaty of Lausanne.

== Characteristics ==
The phonology, morphology, syntax, and vocabulary of the language show both conservative and innovative tendencies across the entire attestation of the language from the ancient to the modern period. The division into conventional periods is, as with all such periodizations, relatively arbitrary, especially because, in all periods, Ancient Greek has enjoyed high prestige, and the literate borrowed heavily from it.

=== Phonology ===
Spoken Modern Greek

Across its history, the syllabic structure of Greek has varied little: Greek shows a mixed syllable structure, permitting complex syllabic onsets but very restricted codas. It has only oral vowels and a fairly stable set of consonantal contrasts. The main phonological changes occurred during the Hellenistic and Roman period (see Koine Greek phonology for details):

- replacement of the pitch accent with a stress accent.
- simplification of the system of vowels and diphthongs: loss of vowel length distinction, monophthongisation of most diphthongs and several steps in a chain shift of vowels towards /i/ (iotacism).
- development of the voiceless aspirated plosives /pʰ/ and /tʰ/ to the voiceless fricatives /f/ and /θ/, respectively; the similar development of /kʰ/ to /x/ may have taken place later (the phonological changes are not reflected in the orthography, and both earlier and later phonemes are written with φ, θ, and χ).
- development of the voiced plosives /b/, /d/, and /ɡ/ to their voiced fricative counterparts /β/ (later /v/), /ð/, and /ɣ/.

=== Morphology ===
In all its stages, the morphology of Greek shows an extensive set of productive derivational affixes, a limited but productive system of compounding and a rich inflectional system. Although its morphological categories have been fairly stable over time, morphological changes are present throughout, particularly in the nominal and verbal systems. The major change in the nominal morphology since the classical stage was the disuse of the dative case (its functions being largely taken over by the genitive). The verbal system has lost the infinitive, the synthetically-formed future, and perfect tenses and the optative mood. Many have been replaced by periphrastic (analytical) forms.

==== Nouns and adjectives ====
Pronouns show distinctions in person (1st, 2nd, and 3rd), number (singular, dual, and plural in the ancient language; singular and plural alone in later stages), and gender (masculine, feminine, and neuter), and decline for case (from six cases in the earliest forms attested to four in the modern language). (Note: The four cases that are found in all stages of Greek are the nominative, genitive, accusative, and vocative. The dative/locative of Ancient Greek disappeared in the late Hellenistic period, and the instrumental case of Mycenaean Greek disappeared in the Archaic period.) Nouns, articles, and adjectives show all the distinctions except for a person. Both attributive and predicative adjectives agree with the noun.

==== Verbs ====
The inflectional categories of the Greek verb have likewise remained largely the same over the course of the language's history but with significant changes in the number of distinctions within each category and their morphological expression. Greek verbs have synthetic inflectional forms for:

	Ancient Greek	Modern Greek
Person	first, second and third	also second person formal
Number	singular, dual and plural	singular and plural
tense	present, past and future	past and non-past (future is expressed by a periphrastic construction)
aspect	imperfective, perfective (traditionally called aorist) and perfect (sometimes also called perfective; see note about terminology)	imperfective and perfective/aorist (perfect is expressed by a periphrastic construction)
mood	indicative, subjunctive, imperative and optative	indicative, subjunctive, (Note: There is no particular morphological form that can be identified as 'subjunctive' in the modern language, but the term is sometimes encountered in descriptions even if the most complete modern grammar (Holton et al. 1997) does not use it and calls certain traditionally-'subjunctive' forms 'dependent'. Most Greek linguists advocate abandoning the traditional terminology (Anna Roussou and Tasos Tsangalidis 2009, in Meletes gia tin Elliniki Glossa, Thessaloniki, Anastasia Giannakidou 2009 "Temporal semantics and polarity: The dependency of the subjunctive revisited", Lingua); see Modern Greek grammar for explanation.) and imperative (other modal functions are expressed by periphrastic constructions)
Voice	active, medio-passive, and passive	active and medio-passive

=== Syntax ===
Many aspects of the syntax of Greek have remained constant: verbs agree with their subject only, the use of the surviving cases is largely intact (nominative for subjects and predicates, accusative for objects of most verbs and many prepositions, genitive for possessors), articles precede nouns, adpositions are largely prepositional, relative clauses follow the noun they modify and relative pronouns are clause-initial. However, the morphological changes also have their counterparts in the syntax, and there are also significant differences between the syntax of the ancient and that of the modern form of the language. Ancient Greek made great use of participial constructions and of constructions involving the infinitive, and the modern variety lacks the infinitive entirely (employing a raft of new periphrastic constructions instead) and uses participles more restrictively. The loss of the dative led to a rise of prepositional indirect objects (and the use of the genitive to directly mark these as well). Ancient Greek tended to be verb-final, but neutral word order in the modern language is verb–subject–object or subject–verb–object.

=== Vocabulary ===
Modern Greek inherits most of its vocabulary from Ancient Greek, which in turn is an Indo-European language, but also includes a number of borrowings from the languages of the populations that inhabited Greece before the arrival of Proto-Greeks, some documented in Mycenaean texts; they include a large number of Greek toponyms. The form and meaning of many words have changed. Loanwords (words of foreign origin) have entered the language, mainly from Latin, Venetian, Ottoman Turkish and Semitic languages. During the older periods of Greek, loanwords into Greek acquired Greek inflections, thus leaving only a foreign root word. Modern borrowings (from the 20th century on), especially from French and English, are typically not inflected; other modern borrowings are derived from Slavic languages, Albanian and Eastern Romance languages (Romanian and Aromanian).

== Loanwords in other languages ==
Greek words have been widely borrowed into other languages, including English. Example words include: mathematics, physics, astronomy, democracy, philosophy, athletics, theatre, rhetoric, baptism, evangelist, etc. Moreover, Greek words and word elements continue to be productive as a basis for coinages (neologisms): anthropology, photography, telephony, isomer, biomechanics, cinematography, etc. Together with Latin words, they form the foundation of international scientific and technical vocabulary; for example, all words ending in -logy ('discourse'). There are many English words of Greek origin.

== Classification ==
Greek is an independent branch of the Indo-European language family. Hellenic is the branch of the Indo-European language family whose principal member is Greek. In most classifications, Hellenic consists of Greek alone, but some linguists use Hellenic to refer to a group consisting of Greek proper and other varieties thought to be related but different enough to be separate languages, either among ancient or modern varieties of Greek. Ancient Macedonian has been considered by some scholars to be part of the Hellenic branch but as a distinct sister language rather than a simple dialect of Greek proper. (Note: Suggested by Georgiev (1966), Joseph (2001) and Hamp (2013).) However, there has been some recent scholarly agreement, often expressed as cautious or tentative, that ancient Macedonian was a dialect of Greek, related to the Northwest Doric group. In addition, some linguists use Hellenic to refer to modern Greek in a narrow sense together with certain other, divergent modern varieties deemed separate languages on the basis of a lack of mutual intelligibility. Separate language status is most often posited for Tsakonian, which is thought to be uniquely a descendant of Doric rather than Attic Greek, followed by Pontic and Cappadocian Greek of Anatolia. The Griko or Italiot varieties of southern Italy are also not readily intelligible to speakers of standard Greek. Separate status is sometimes also argued for Cypriot, though this is not as easily justified. In contrast, Yevanic (Jewish Greek) is mutually intelligible with standard Greek but is sometimes considered a separate language for ethnic and cultural reasons. Greek linguistics traditionally treat all of these as dialects of a single language.

Additionally, current consensus regards the now extinct Phrygian language as the closest relative of Greek since they share a number of phonological, morphological, and lexical isoglosses, with some being exclusive between them. Scholars have proposed a Graeco-Phrygian subgroup out of which Greek and Phrygian originated. Some Indo-Europeanists suggest that Greek may be most closely related to Armenian (see Graeco-Armenian) or the Indo-Iranian languages (see Graeco-Aryan), but little definitive evidence has been found. In addition, Albanian has also been considered somewhat related to Greek (see Graeco-Albanian languages), and it has been proposed that they form together with Armenian a higher-order subgroup along with other ancient extinct languages of the Balkans; this higher-order subgroup is usually termed Palaeo-Balkan, and Greek has a central position in it.

== Writing system ==
=== Linear B ===
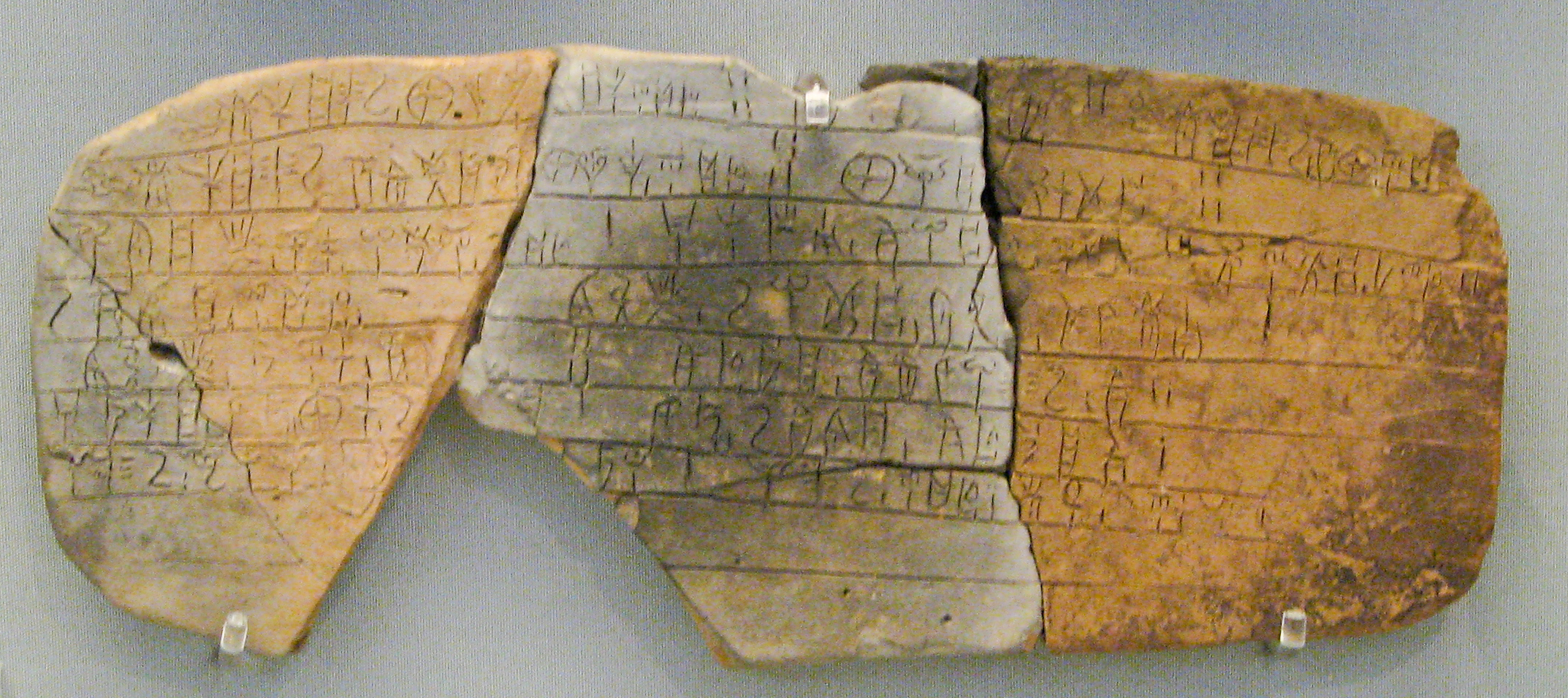
Inscription written using the Linear B syllabary on a tablet

Linear B, attested as early as the late 15th century BC, was the first script used to write Greek. It is basically a syllabary, which was finally deciphered by Michael Ventris and John Chadwick, based on the research of Alice Kober, in the 1950s (its precursor, Linear A, has not been deciphered and most likely encodes a non-Greek language). The language of the Linear B texts, Mycenaean Greek, is the earliest known form of Greek.

=== Cypriot syllabary ===
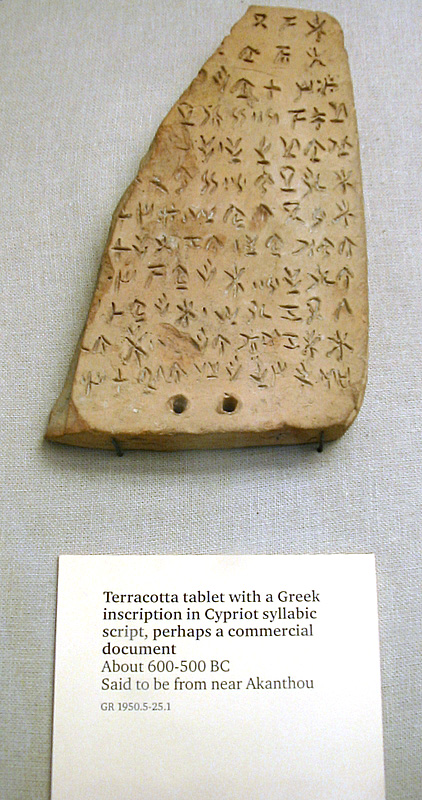
Greek inscription in Cypriot syllabic script

Another similar system used to write the Greek language was the Cypriot syllabary (also a descendant of Linear A via the intermediate Cypro-Minoan syllabary), which is closely related to Linear B but uses somewhat different syllabic conventions to represent phoneme sequences. The Cypriot syllabary is attested in Cyprus from the 11th century BC until its gradual abandonment in the late Classical period, in favor of the standard Greek alphabet.

=== Greek alphabet ===
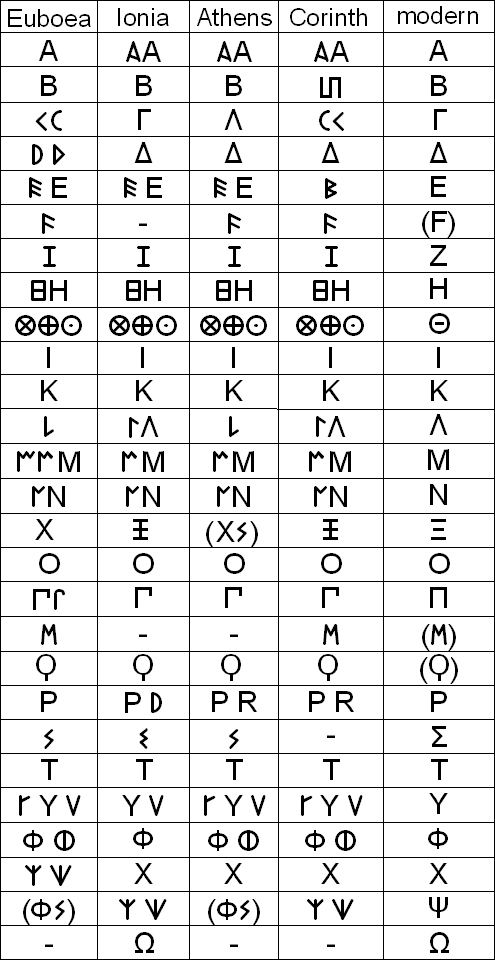
Ancient epichoric variants of the Greek alphabet from Euboea, Ionia, Athens, and Corinth comparing to modern Greek

Greek has been written in the Greek alphabet since approximately the 9th century BC. It was created by modifying the Phoenician alphabet, with the innovation of adopting certain letters to represent the vowels. The variant of the alphabet in use today is essentially the late Ionic variant, introduced for writing classical Attic in 403 BC. In classical Greek, as in classical Latin, only upper-case letters existed. The lower-case Greek letters were developed much later by medieval scribes to permit a faster, more convenient cursive writing style with the use of ink and quill.

The Greek alphabet consists of 24 letters, each with an uppercase (majuscule) and lowercase (minuscule) form. The letter sigma has an additional lowercase form (ς) used in the final position of a word:

upper case
Α	Β	Γ	Δ	Ε	Ζ	Η	Θ	Ι	Κ	Λ	Μ	Ν	Ξ	Ο	Π	Ρ	Σ	Τ	Υ	Φ	Χ	Ψ	Ω
lower case
α	β	γ	δ	ε	ζ	η	θ	ι	κ	λ	μ	ν	ξ	ο	π	ρ	σ ς	τ	υ	φ	χ	ψ	ω

==== Diacritics ====
In addition to the letters, the Greek alphabet features a number of diacritical signs: three different accent marks (acute, grave, and circumflex), originally denoting different shapes of pitch accent on the stressed vowel; the so-called breathing marks (rough and smooth breathing), originally used to signal presence or absence of word-initial /h/; and the diaeresis, used to mark the full syllabic value of a vowel that would otherwise be read as part of a diphthong. These marks were introduced during the course of the Hellenistic period. Actual usage of the grave in handwriting saw a rapid decline in favor of uniform usage of the acute during the late 20th century, and it has only been retained in typography.

After the writing reform of 1982, most diacritics are no longer used. Since then, Greek has been written mostly in the simplified monotonic orthography (or monotonic system), which employs only the acute accent and the diaeresis. The traditional system, now called the polytonic orthography (or polytonic system), is still used internationally for the writing of Ancient Greek.

==== Punctuation ====
In Greek, the question mark is written as the English semicolon, while the functions of the colon and semicolon are performed by a raised point (•), known as the ano teleia (άνω τελεία). In Greek the comma also functions as a silent letter in a handful of Greek words, principally distinguishing ό,τι (ó,ti, 'whatever') from ότι (óti, 'that').

Ancient Greek texts often used scriptio continua ('continuous writing'), which means that ancient authors and scribes would write word after word with no spaces or punctuation between words to differentiate or mark boundaries. Boustrophedon, or bi-directional text, was also used in Ancient Greek.

=== Latin alphabet ===
Greek has occasionally been written in the Latin script, especially in areas under Venetian rule or by Greek Catholics. The term Frankolevantinika / Φραγκολεβαντίνικα applies when the Latin script is used to write Greek in the cultural ambit of Catholicism (because Frankos / Φράγκος is an older Greek term for West-European dating to when most of (Roman Catholic Christian) West Europe was under the control of the Frankish Empire). Frankochiotika / Φραγκοχιώτικα (meaning 'Catholic Chiot') alludes to the significant presence of Catholic missionaries based on the island of Chios. Additionally, the term Greeklish is often used when the Greek language is written in a Latin script in online communications.

The Latin script is nowadays used by the Greek-speaking communities of Southern Italy.

=== Hebrew alphabet ===
The Yevanic dialect was written by Romaniote and Constantinopolitan Karaite Jews using the Hebrew Alphabet.

=== Arabic alphabet ===
In a tradition, that in modern time, has come to be known as Greek Aljamiado, some Greek Muslims from Crete wrote their Cretan Greek in the Arabic alphabet. The same happened among Epirote Muslims in Ioannina. This also happened among Arabic-speaking Byzantine rite Christians in the Levant (Lebanon, Palestine, Syria and Jordan). This usage is sometimes called aljamiado, as when Romance languages are written in the Arabic alphabet.

== Example text ==
Greek pronunciation

Article 1 of the Universal Declaration of Human Rights in Greek:

Όλοι οι άνθρωποι γεννιούνται ελεύθεροι και ίσοι στην αξιοπρέπεια και τα δικαιώματα. Είναι προικισμένοι με λογική και συνείδηση, και οφείλουν να συμπεριφέρονται μεταξύ τους με πνεύμα αδελφοσύνης.

Transcription of the example text into Latin alphabet:

Óloi oi ánthropoi gennioúntai eléftheroi kai ísoi stin axioprépeia kai ta dikaiómata. Eínai proikisménoi me logikí kai syneídisi, kai ofeíloun na symperiférontai metaxý tous me pnévma adelfosýnis.

Article 1 of the Universal Declaration of Human Rights in English:

"All human beings are born free and equal in dignity and rights. They are endowed with reason and conscience and should act towards one another in a spirit of brotherhood."

== See also ==
- List of medical roots, suffixes and prefixes
