= Standard Greek =

Standard Greek may refer to:

- Attic Greek, the main Greek dialect that was spoken in ancient Attica, which includes Athens
- Koiné Greek, also known as Hellenistic Greek, the common supra-regional form of Greek spoken and written during Hellenistic and Roman antiquity
- Katharevousa, a form of the Modern Greek language conceived in the early 19th century as a compromise between Ancient Greek and the Demotic Greek of the time
- Demotic Greek, the modern vernacular form of the Greek language, the form of the language that evolved naturally from Ancient Greek, which became the official standard in 1976
- Standard Modern Greek

== See also ==
- Greek language question
