= Greek language question =

19th and 20th century dispute about popular and learned language varieties of Greek

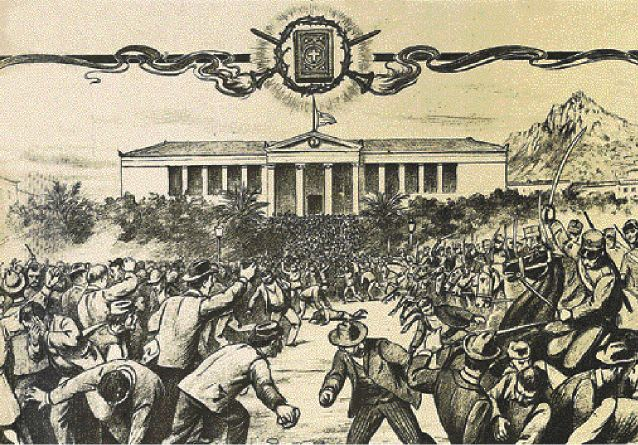
The Gospel riots in 1901, a series of bloody episodes following the publication of biblical texts in Demotic

The Greek language question (Greek: το γλωσσικό ζήτημα, to glossikó zítima) was a dispute about whether the vernacular of the Greek people (Demotic Greek) or a cultivated literary language based on Ancient Greek (Katharevousa) should be the prevailing language of the people and government of Greece. It was a highly controversial topic in the 19th and 20th centuries, and was finally resolved in 1976 when Demotic was made the official language. The language phenomenon in question, which also occurs elsewhere in the world, is called diglossia.

== Linguistic background ==
While Demotic was the vernacular of the Greeks, Katharevousa was an archaic and formal variant that was pronounced like Modern Greek, but it adopted both lexical and morphological features of Ancient Greek that the spoken language had lost over time. Examples:

- Morphological features: Strict Katharevousa used the ancient dative case, many participles and various additional tenses and conjugational patterns of verbs.
- Phonological features: Katharevousa contained various spelling pronunciations that did not fit the Modern Greek phonological system. For example, νδρ (Ancient and Demotic /ndr/, Katharevousa /nðr/); φθ (Ancient /pʰtʰ/), [α]υθ, [ε]υθ: Demotic /ft/, Katharevousa /fθ/; σθ; ρθρ.
- Syntactical features: While the vernacular mostly consisted of simple sentences (parataxis), Katharevousa often applied ancient Greek syntax to form long and complex sentences (syntaxis), which would give the impression of educated speech and reflect the tenor of the ancient corpus.
- Lexical features: The proponents of the formal language discarded many popular Greek words that the Greek language had borrowed from other languages over time, mainly from Turkish, Latin and Italian, and replaced them either with ancient Greek words or with neologisms. Similarly, words of Ancient Greek origin but now in modern form were archaised or replaced by their standard Ancient Greek equivalents (like the Ancient Greek ἰχθύς for ψάρι 'fish' or the archaised form εξωκλήσσιον for the modern ξωκλήσι 'small chapel').

These differences meant that Katharevousa was only partly intelligible to a Greek without higher education. There was no single Katharevousa. Instead, proponents of the formal language put forward ever-changing variants that were never standardized. These variants approached Attic Greek in extreme cases, but they could also be closer to spoken Greek and could thus be understood by the majority of the people.

== Sample text ==
The Greek language question concerns the co-existence of two forms of Greek that sometimes differ significantly. Such differences can greatly exceed common stylistic differences between written and spoken or formal and informal forms of language, as demonstrated in the following text:

- Katharevousa:
Τὸ ὑποβληθὲν τῇ Ἱερᾷ Συνόδῳ ἐν χειρογράφῳ πόνημα Ὑμῶν ὑπὸ τὸν τίτλον «Βίος Ἰησοῦ Χριστοῦ» παρέπεμψεν αὔτη τῷ προεδρευόντι αὐτῆς Σεβ. Ἀρχιεπισκόπῳ Σύρου, Τήνου καὶ Ἄνδρου κ. Μεθοδίῳ, ὅπως δι' ἐκθέσεως αὐτοῦ ἀναφέρῃ αὐτῇ, ἂν τὸ περιεχόμενον τοῦ πονήματος τούτου εἶναι σύμφωνον πρὸς τὰς παραδόσεις τῆς Ὀρθοδόξου Ἐκκλησίας.
Tò hypovlithèn tí Hierá Synódo en cheirográfo pónima Hymón hypò tòn títlon «Víos Iesoú Christoú» parépempsen auti tó proedrevónti autís Sev. Archiepiskópo Sýrou, Tínou kaì Androu k. Methodío, ópos di' ekthéseos autoú anaféri autí, an tò periechómenon toú ponímatos toútou eínai sýmfonon pròs tàs paradóseis tís Orthodóksou Ekklisías.
- Demotic:
Το πόνημά σας που υποβλήθηκε σε χειρόγραφο στην Ιερά Σύνοδο με τον τίτλο «Βίος Ιησού Χριστού» παραπέμφθηκε στον πρόεδρό της Σεβ. Αρχιεπίσκοπο Σύρου, Τήνου και Άνδρου κ. Μεθόδιο, ώστε με έκθεσή του να της αναφέρει αν το περιεχόμενο του πονήματος αυτού είναι σύμφωνο με τις παραδόσεις της Ορθόδοξης Εκκλησίας.
To pónimá sas pou ipovlíthike se chirógrafo stin Ierá Sínodo me ton títlo «Víos Iesoú Christoú», parapémfthike ston próedró tis Sev. Archiepískopo Sírou, Tínou kai Androu k. Methódio, óste me ékthesí tou na tis anaféri an to periechómeno tou ponímatos aftoú eínai símfono me tis paradósis tis Orthódoksis Ekklisías.
- Modern English:
Your work, which was submitted in manuscript to the Holy Synod under the title "Life of Jesus Christ", was sent to Methodios, its President Archbishop of Syros, Tinos and Andros, so that he may report on whether the content of this work accords with the traditions of the Orthodox Church.

== Historical development ==
=== Pre-revolutionary discussions (1766–1830) ===
The discussion began at the end of the 18th century, as Eugenios Voulgaris (1716–1806), Lambros Photiadis, St. Kommitas and Neophytos Doukas, who were proponents of a more archaic language, and Voulgaris' students Iosipos Moisiodax (1725–1800) and Dimitrios Katartzis (c. 1730 –1807), who proposed a simpler language, began to voice their opinions. The phanariots were a group of conservative and educated nobles who supported the archaic language and were the most important critics of the language of the people. This discussion later became crucial when it was to be decided which one should be the single language of the modern Greek state, which was yet to be founded. Adamantios Korais (1748–1833) influenced the further discussion considerably. While being a supporter of the language of the people, Korais sought to cleanse it from elements that he considered to be too "vulgar" and eventually invented Katharevousa. After a prolonged War of Independence, the modern Greek state was founded in 1830; the first capital was Nafplio and, from 1834 onwards, Athens.

=== Katharevousa as the language of the newborn state (1830–80) ===
==== Adoption of Katharevousa ====
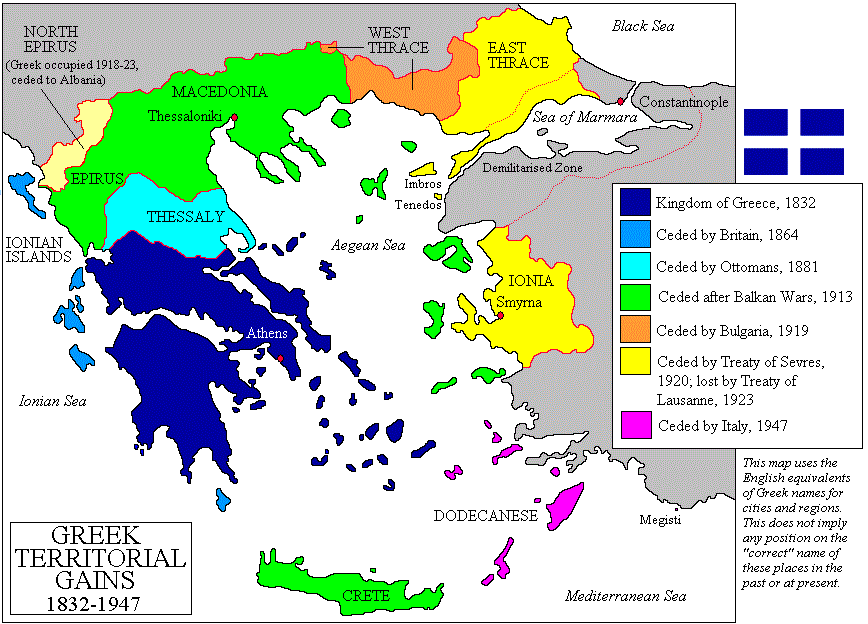
Territorial expansion of Greece from 1832 to 1947, key to understand where Katharevousa was taught

Publishing had been brought almost to a halt by the war, and with it the intellectual debate, but by 1830 an informal consensus had been reached that the new state should have a unified written language modeled on Korais' version of Katharevousa; "... the romantic-classical ideology of the new state that emerged from [the War] could not condone the use of 'vulgar' spoken Greek; instead it installed the linguistic compromise solution advocated by Korais as a provisional measure until such time as Ancient Greek could be fully revived. What was perhaps intended to be a temporary stop-gap, however, eventually became firmly entrenched as the established form of Greek in official use".

The adoption, however, was not expressed in formal or legal terms specifying Katharevousa as "the language of the state". (Note: Some authorities state incorrectly that Katharevousa was made the official language of the state in 1834. In fact, that did not happen until 1911 (see the 'Opposition to demoticism' section). Mackridge 2009 (footnote on p. 163) lists some of the authors repeating this error and adds that it arose from "a misreading of Chourmouzios 1939:1442, who states that 'the educational laws of 1834 and 1836 essentially recognized the archaizing language as the official language'.") To do so would have dashed the hopes of the many who hoped that Ancient Greek itself would one day take over that role. It would also have been difficult to specify to a legal standard of precision exactly what was meant by "Katharevousa glossa" (at the time, Katharevousa was still an adjective). In fact, the only mention of language in legislation appeared in the educational laws of 1834 and 1836, which established that Ancient Greek (not Katharevousa) should continue to be the only language of the readers and textbooks used in schools.

There was also no official body to make such decisions: "It is characteristic of the Greek case that, while language reforms in other new states were undertaken with the help of official and semi-official bodies, Katharevousa was developed in an empirical and unsystematic fashion, without congresses, commissions, and academies, and with little official support".

Korais himself (though an admirer of the legislated clarity and precision of French) explicitly rejected the idea of a top-down imposition of language standards by a body modelled on the Académie française. As a secular republican in language as well as in politics, he rejected this "tyranny" and favoured an informal "parliamentary" model; the poets and prose writers are the "legislators", "elected" by the size of their readership, and they have a duty to guide the language wisely by their majority opinion and their example. Guidance is necessary, to avoid the "mob rule" of undisciplined and uncorrected Demotic, but ultimate authority still lies with the people, whose judgement over the long term decides which works and writers are "elected" as the classics to be emulated.

In line with these principles, Korais took great pains not to appear to be a one-man Académie. Much of his writing on the language question was published in the prefaces to his 16-volume Hellenic Library series of ancient Greek texts, and they were modestly titled "Impromptu thoughts on Greek culture and language". Most of his other linguistic studies were issued as five collected volumes under the even more self-effacing title Atakta, a "jumbled miscellany". It has even been suggested that "the chief reason why Korais did not publish a grammar of Modern Greek was precisely that he wanted to avoid legislating on grammatical matters".

In 1833, the year of Korais' death, a new collected edition of his "Impromptu thoughts..." prefaces was published, making his ideas available to a much wider audience than before and providing a linguistic example to follow.

Two of his ideas in particular had widespread influence: his admiration of Ancient Greek beauty, and his belief in the necessity of "correcting" the modern language. The rhetoric of the time is "full of adjectives such as 'correct', 'rich', 'pure', 'noble' and even 'sacred' to describe Ancient Greek and/or Katharevousa and their antonyms 'ungrammatical', 'poor', 'corrupt' or 'adulterated', 'vulgar' or 'base', and 'profane' or even 'blasphemous' to refer to Demotic".

Foreign loanwords were especially reviled. As Korais had written, "To borrow from foreigners—or, to speak more clearly, to beg words and phrases, with which the storerooms of one's language are already replete—creates a reputation for complete ignorance or even idiocy as well as dishonour".

In this intellectual climate, the population set to work with enthusiasm to restore the national honour by "correcting" the Greek vocabulary. Alehouses and brewers took down the signs saying μπιραρία biraria (from Italian birreria) and put up ζυθοπωλείον 'ale-house'. Grocers took down μπακάλικο (from Turkish bakkal) and put up παντοπωλείον while various academics and professionals devised and issued (at the invitation of the state) vocabularies appropriate to their fields; the more "official" the field, the more like Ancient Greek the new vocabulary appeared.

For example, the newly formed Royal Hellenic Navy introduced the use of Ancient Greek nautical terms although civilian seamen continued to use the traditional ones, many of them loanwords from Italian, owing to the centuries-old maritime influence of Venice and Genoa, and with borrowings from the Italian-based Mediterranean Lingua Franca of the Levantine ports.

==== Hopes in the 1830s ====
Geographical and political isolation of the Ionian Islands kept their vernacular Greek different from that of mainlanders

In Athens, the new capital, now that Katharevousa had been accepted for official purposes, most hopes for the future were concentrated on "ennobling" and "correcting" everyday speech; outside the Ionian Islands (which would not become part of the Greek state until 1864), very few now argued for the use of "uncorrected" Demotic as the language of the state. Quite apart from its supposed inadequacy and vulgarity, there had been another political and diplomatic reason to rule out using Demotic as the state language. In 1830 the population of the new Greek state was about 800,000; but outside the borders were at least two million more Greek-speakers (mainly in the remaining provinces of the Ottoman Empire and the British-controlled Ionian Islands), and millions more members of the Greek Orthodox Church who worshiped in Koine Greek and shared much Greek culture even though they spoke other languages such as Albanian or Aromanian at home. At this early stage of the Greek state, it was far from clear how large its borders would ultimately be and whether citizenship would depend on language, religion, or simple residence. It was recognized, though, that if Demotic had become the state language, it might well have alienated millions of non-Greek speaking Orthodox believers within the potentially much larger future borders.

Among the believers in "correction", hopes were still divided between those who pushed for the full resurrection of Ancient Greek (bringing with it "Truth and Freedom", as Soutsos put it later), and the majority who believed with Korais that this was quite unrealistic but that Demotic could still be "corrected" to the less demanding level of Katharevousa. Both believed wholeheartedly in the power of the written language to transform the spoken one; they hoped that the "pure" forms would naturally trickle down to replace the "corrupted" Demotic ones and that the spoken language would thus be pulled up to a "richer" and "nobler" level.

There was also a moral and spiritual side to linguistic "correction". Korais had believed, "Because of their enslavement to foreign rulers, the Modern Greeks were incapable of thinking properly and thus of speaking properly; the correction of language would, however, lead to the correction of both thought and behaviour". It was hoped that as the damage done to the spoken language by centuries of subjection to "Oriental despotism" was gradually repaired, the Greeks would begin to think more like their rational, critical and creative ancestors, and that the political and cultural life of the nation would thus be revitalized.

Skarlatos Vyzantios played a leading role among the supporters of full Ancient Greek revival. In 1835 he published the first dictionary of spoken Demotic to be compiled by a Greek for almost two centuries: the Dictionary of Our Hellenic Dialect Interpreted into Ancient Greek and French. Here, the definitions and explanations were all given in Ancient Greek and French, used as precision instruments to dissect "grocers' style" Demotic, which was treated more as an object of study than a medium of communication. Vyzantios concluded his dictionary with a list of words of foreign origin (many of them Turkish) that were to be expelled from Demotic as part of its "purification".

In his preface (Note: Many other writers of the time followed Korais's practice of giving their views on the language question in prefaces and introductions to authoritative scholarly works) he argued that "it would be ridiculous to express scholarly and scientific ideas in 'grocers' style'; for this reason, in order to be written down, our spoken language must be corrected according to that of our ancient forebears: the gap between Ancient and Modern Greek must be eliminated by writing in a more archaic language than that which is spoken, so that readers will familiarize themselves with the ancient forms". Like Korais, he was confident that "poets and other writers will control the future development of the language" and that Demotic speakers would follow their lead and start to "purify" their own speech.

The majority, however, now followed Korais in recognizing with regret that the gap between Demotic and Ancient Greek was now too large to be bridged this way in one step. After all, Demotic speakers had been exposed to Ancient Greek in church and school for centuries without any noticeable trickle down; the languages had simply grown too far apart for any such diffusion to be possible.

It was hoped now that Katharevousa would be close enough to Demotic for its "purifying" influence to work. As Korais had written in 1804: "Root out from the language the weeds of vulgarity, yet not all at once by the forkful, but gradually with the hand, one after the other; sow Hellenic seeds in it, but these too by the handful and not by the sackful. You will be surprised how in a short while your words and phrases have passed from the book into the mouths of the people".

Typical of the many prominent intellectuals who believed that this would work was the statesman and diplomat Spyridon Trikoupis, whose authoritative History of the Greek Revolution was written in Katharevousa. "In the introduction to his History Trikoupis attacked the archaizers and promoted Korais' 'middle way', which he followed in practice in his book .... He expressed the hope that the spoken and written language would eventually become one and the same, arguing that the spoken language could not be properly cultivated if it was so widely separated from the written variety that mutual influence between the two became impossible".

Katharevousa thus formed part of a reasoned strategy for empowering ordinary people by improving the language in which they spoke and thought, admittedly not to Ancient Greek standards but as close as was currently practicable. In its practical concern for the linguistic welfare of the whole population, it "represented the triumph of Enlightenment intellectuals over the Ancient Greek resurrection proposal".

==== Drift towards archaization ====
During the next few decades, however, the Katharevousa in general use grew more and more archaic as writers gradually introduced Ancient Greek features (like the noun dative case) that had not been present in Korais' version. In part, it was driven by a search for internal correctness or at least consistency, (Note: As an example, Korais had used Ancient Greek prepositions wherever possible, such as πρό + genitive for 'before', instead of the Demotic πριν από. But he could not use εν for 'in' because this would have taken a noun in the dative case; he preferred to write εἰς + accusative (although this meant 'into' in Ancient Greek). Many felt that this was an "inadequate compromise", as Soutsos put it, and tried to do better; but their options were limited. They could use εν but with another case; however, it would look rather like a grammatical error and lay them open to ridicule from other writers. They could re-introduce the dative just for use with prepositions; but it would look rather arbitrary. They could re-introduce the dative case in all its ancient uses; it gave maximum internal consistency, and was also the easiest to defend against critics and rival authors, and so it became a frequent choice.) and in part by a feeling that since Ancient Greek was the ideal language, any approach to it could only be regarded as progress. Not only did new writers use more archaic forms than their predecessors; individual authors also tended to use more archaisms as their careers advanced—sometimes even in successive editions of the same work. Soutsos first published his ground-breaking Katharevousa dramatic poem "The Wayfarer" (Ὁ Ὁδοιπόρος) in 1831, using much Demotic vocabulary and grammar. However, the editions of 1842 and then 1853 contained progressively more archaic language.

However, the question of exactly which archaisms to re-introduce provoked much acrimonious bickering among scholars. This flared up in 1853, when Panagiotis Soutsos published New School of the Written Word, or Resurrection of the Ancient Greek Language Understood by All. Breaking with the convention of respecting Korais (while still making archaizing "corrections"), in this pamphlet he rejected the whole idea of a "simplified" Ancient Greek, dismissing Katharevousa as a "meagre Frankish edifice" full of imported Gallicisms, and deriding the university professors whose writing was hardly Greek at all, merely literally translated French. He declared "that the hearts and minds of the modern Greeks will be elevated by writing Ancient Greek, and that they will thereby learn Truth and Freedom". Accordingly, Soutsos proposed to restore almost all of the ancient grammar to the current language. Even Soutsos, however, had limits. He left out the dual number, and the logical connectives γάρ 'for' and οὖν 'therefore', as being too far from modern usage; and in yet another compromise, he admitted that the public were not yet ready for the ancient negative particle οὐ, while also recommending that the Demotic equivalent δεν should be avoided, thus leaving his followers with no easy way of writing 'not'.

The proposal drew an immediate counter-attack from Soutsos' bitter academic rival Konstantinos Asopios: The Soutseia, or Mr Panagiotis Soutsos Scrutinized as a Grammarian, Philologist, Schoolmaster, Metrician and Poet. After pointing out errors and solecisms in Soutsos' own language, Asopios went on to defend Korais' general 'simplifying' approach, but with the addition of his own selection of archaisms. (Note: Among prepositions, for example, ἐν was now included (because it had just managed to survive into Demotic in the fossilized expression ἐν τούτοις 'nevertheless'), as was ἐξ 'out of' for similar reasons, but ἀμφι 'round, about' was left out because it had not survived even in fossilized form. However, this new selection criterion did seem somewhat arbitrary to others.) The exchange sparked a small war of pamphlets from other pedants, competing to expose inconsistencies, grammatical errors, and phrases literally translated from French in the works of their rivals, and proposing their own alternative sets of rules.

In this climate of academic discord, it was difficult for the educational authorities to know what grammatical rules to teach in the few years of primary education available to most Greeks. The matter was settled in 1856 when a royal decree re-affirmed the decisions of 1834 and 1836 and laid down, "As the grammar of the Greek language ... that of the ancient language alone is prescribed" for teaching in primary schools; it was the only consistent set of rules with a status that all could agree on.

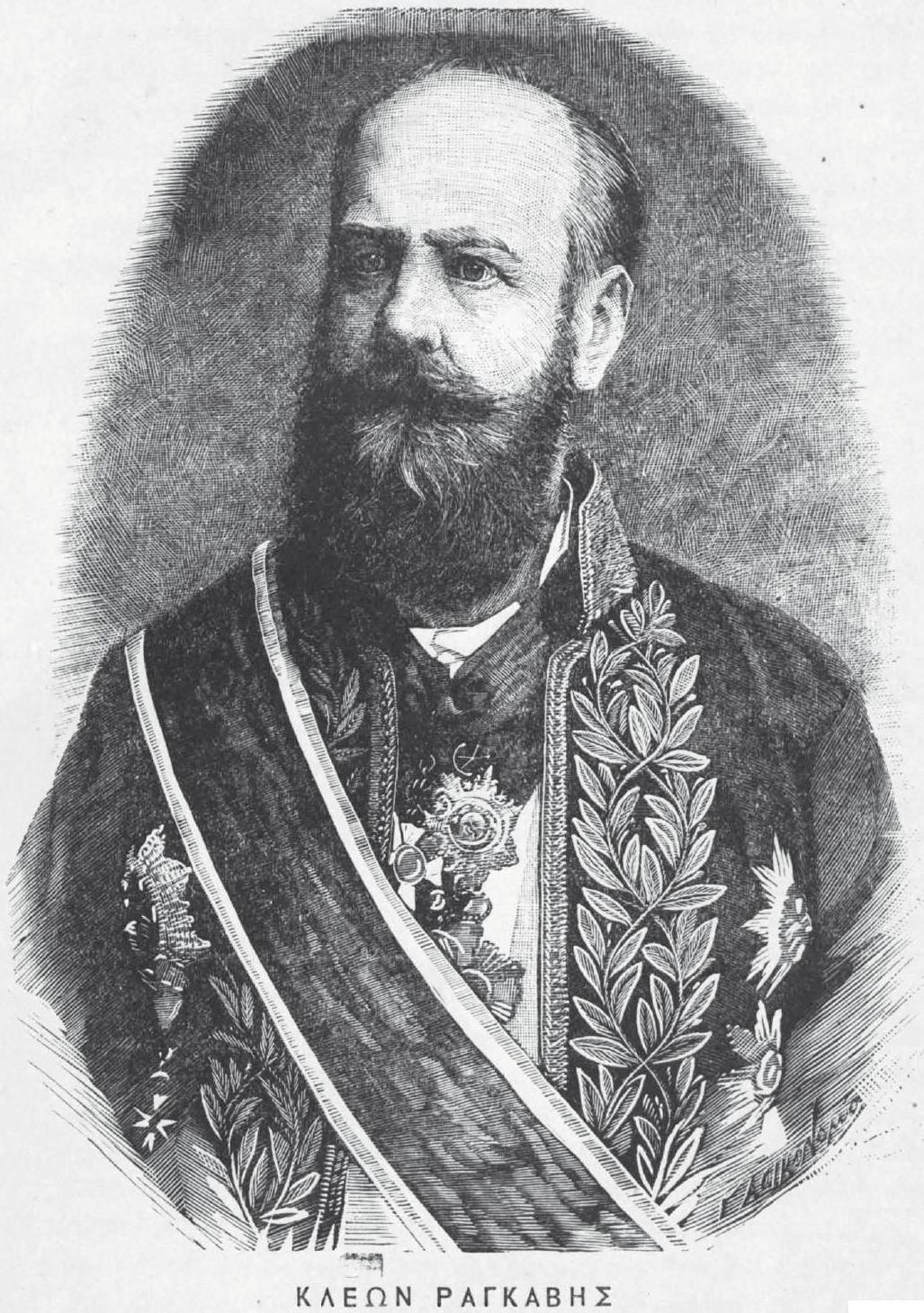
Kleon Rangavis (1809–98) in 1887

Meanwhile, although the details were under continual dispute, the drift towards the archaic continued; to men who visualized the language as a magnificent building in need of restoration, the structure would always seem ugly and incomplete until the last piece had been slotted back into place. By 1877, the diplomat and Katharevousa poet Kleon Rangavis (Note: Son of Alexandros Rizos Rangavis, the statesman and also a noted Katharevousa writer) could write:

Ἐπείσθημεν ὅτι, τῆς δοτικῆς ἤδη γενικῶς παραδεκτῆς γενομένης, ἀκολουθήσει (Note: one-word classical future tense—which would place the author himself among the "better writers".) αὐτὴν ὁ μέλλων, ὁ καὶ νῦν παρὰ τοῖς κρείττοσιν (Note: among the better, the dative of an obsolete comparative) ἐν χρήσει, τοῦτον τὸ ἀπαρέμφατον, τὸ πολλαχοῦ ἀνατέλλον, καὶ τὰ ἀρνητικά μόρια ... (Note: We-have-been-persuaded that, the dative already generally accepted having-become, will-follow it the future-tense, the even now among the better in use, this (will follow) the infinitive, the in-many-places rising-up, and the negative particles ...)

We are convinced, now that the dative has become generally accepted, that the future, which is already in use among the better writers, will follow it, and that the infinitive, on the increase in many quarters, will follow this in turn, together with the negative particles ...

This extract is from the introduction to Julian the Transgressor (Ιουλιανός ο παραβάτης: ποίημα δραματικόν), the "dramatic poem" in which Rangavis attempted to re-introduce the long-disused infinitive into poetry. Although this author was an extreme example, his linguistic ambition had been widely shared; Skarlatos D. Vyzantios, well known for his 1835 dictionary of Demotic, had written as late as 1862 that "resurrection from the dead of our paternal language is our sweetest dream".

Rangavis himself continued to write ever more archaic virtuoso works, notably Theodora (1884). But in the event, he was to be one of the last archaists in Greek literature, and Mackridge evaluated Theodora as "remarkable and futile".

==== Consequences for language and literacy ====
Almost all of these writers "subscribed to the frequently expressed argument that as long as the λαός (the common people) could passively comprehend a certain usage, then this was sufficient justification for adopting it; the question whether the λαός could actively handle such a usage was usually ignored" (emphasis in the original).

In practice, even after fifty years of exposure to them and given several years of Ancient Greek grammar lessons in primary school, the 'common people' had adopted none of the archaic usages. They were happy to use newly coined Katharevousa terms for modern inventions, (Note: Among many examples: πανεπιστήμιον 'university' introduced by Korais in 1810, λεωφορεῖον 'bus' 1863, both still in use today though without the final -ν.) and some (though not all) (Note: The names of everyday objects were particularly resistant to 'purification'. 'Necktie' remained γραβάτα (Italian cravatta) and 'coffee' stayed καφές (Turkish kahve). The "purified" alternatives λαιμοδέτης (1871) 'neck-tie' and the much-ridiculed νηφοκοκκόζυμον 'sober-berry-brew' never did win popular support.) alternatives for loanwords, but the trickle-down of Ancient Greek grammatical forms into the language of ordinary people that Korais and Vyzantios had hoped for simply did not happen. It seemed that the scholars had greatly overestimated the influence of the written word on everyday speech patterns.

In fact, instead of closing the gap by gradually pulling Demotic up to its own level, Katharevousa was moving away from the spoken language, widening the gap and leaving the "common people" behind. As a result, while many Greeks could read (or at least puzzle out) the Katharevousa in official use, only a minority could now write it with any pleasure or confidence. It was far from the universal standard language of Korais' vision; writing itself was becoming the preserve of a small elite.

By the 1870s, it had become a matter of serious concern. In the Ionian Islands, politically detached from the mainland until 1864 and thus less concerned with the language politics there, Andreas Laskaratos wrote in 1872 that "the logiótatoi [pedants], the enemies of the nation, while pretending to speak to the nation in a language better than its own, are speaking and writing in a language that the nation does not understand, [with the result that] it remains untutored, ignorant and barbarous, and consequently betrayed by them".

A decade later in Athens, among the logiόtatoi, even the young Georgios Hatzidakis (newly appointed assistant professor of linguistics at Athens University, and later to become Katharevousa's greatest defender) had come to recognize the problem. In one of his earliest published pieces (in the magazine Estia, 1883) he admitted, "In our struggle to render the written language more noble, we are allowing the Greek people to become more uncouth." However, he explicitly ruled out switching to writing in Demotic, which he dismissed as "the tattered Romaic language, which is not sufficient for anything" (emphasis in original).

==== End of hopes for the resurrection of Ancient Greek ====
By about 1880, it had become tacitly accepted that the fifty-year dream of Vyzantios, Soutsos and their fellows had failed: neither the "common people" nor the State would ever be using Ancient Greek as their everyday language. Katharevousa thus lost one of its justifications, as a necessary halfway stage in the natural restoration of the ancient language. It would now have to stand on its own merits as the practical written language of a modern state.

It was also clear that something had to be done to loosen the grip of Ancient Greek on the educational system. Accordingly, in 1881, provision was officially made for the teaching of some Katharevousa in Greek primary schools. It was the first time that anything other than Ancient Greek had been allowed in education. However, change was slow; some Ancient Greek continued to be taught in primary schools until 1917, and secondary schools were allowed nothing else until 1909.

=== Early signs of changing attitudes to Demotic (1870–80) ===
==== Ionian Islands ====
It was in the Ionian Islands, part of the Greek state only after 1864 and culturally still on the periphery, that the first stirrings of a new Demotic movement appeared. On the mainland, the First Athenian School of literature had been concentrating on Katharevousa since 1830; but in the Islands the Heptanesian tradition of Demotic poetry associated with Dionysios Solomos lived on, and some were still prepared to argue for the written use of the spoken language.

In 1850 there was a new development when Antonios Manousos produced the first collection of Greek folk-songs to be published on Greek soil: National Songs. This was one of the first shoots of the folklore movement that was to blossom a generation later, though for the moment its influence was limited to the Ionian Islands. But Manousos did more than just collect. In his preface, he presented a satirical dialogue between "the Editor" (in Demotic) and "a Pedant" (in archaic Katharevousa) which raised many of the issues central to the Language Question. The Editor defends his decision to value and preserve the songs, while the Pedant complains about their language, making himself look rather ridiculous in the process. Manousos ended his preface with a long quotation from Ioannis Vilaras in support of the written use of the spoken language, and immediately put this into practice by writing his own commentaries on the songs in Demotic.

Such arguments did not find a sympathetic ear in the mainland Greek state. When in 1853 the Ionian poet Georgios Tertsetis was bold enough to enter the national poetry competition with the Demotic poem "Corinna and Pindar" the adjudicator advised that "we must not dissipate our forces in the specific development of dialects, but concentrate them on the dignified formation of the Panhellenic language". The adjudicator was Alexandros Rizos Rangavis, one of the most influential literary men of the time. Language policy at the time was very much at the service of the Megali Idea, the grand re-unification of the entire Greek nation. Some critics were less polite; an anonymous newspaper article (probably written by Soutsos) sharply told Tertsetis that it was inappropriate for Ionians, who possessed "a poor dialect", to impose it on "the language of the free Hellenes".

==== Valaoritis' "national" poetry becomes respectable ====
However, these attitudes were to be softened over the next two decades, notably by Aristotelis Valaoritis, Ionian poet and parliamentarian, whose work significantly advanced the acceptance of Demotic as a language of poetry.

During his early career in the Parliament of the United States of the Ionian Islands, Valaoritis had become famous for his passionately patriotic poems, written in vigorous Demotic with dramatic dialogue and a style recalling Greek folk-song. But (in an 1857 foreword, just after the Soutsos controversy) he had also mounted a strong defence of the general use of "the language of the people" in poetry: "Born automatically, it is not the work of art, unlike the [Katharevousa] that is being devised at present ... it is the sole remaining shoot on the venerable old tree of our nationality".

When (after the unification of 1864) Valaoritis moved to Athens to take a seat in the national Greek Parliament, his high reputation went with him; and when in 1872 the university commissioned him to write a commemorative poem, it described his language as "sweetly spoken and entirely national". Although this referred only to its use in poetry, Athenian attitudes to Demotic had now begun to change, particularly in the years after 1870. It was no longer just the "debased grocers' slang" of a generation before. In the next year, 1873, the national poetry competition was won for the first time by a collection of poems in Demotic—The Voice of My Heart by the young Dimitrios Kampouroglou.

When it came to prose, however, even Valaoritis still used Katharevousa.

==== Konemenos and The Question of the Language ====
In 1873, Nikolaos Konemenos (brought up in Lefkada and Corfu in the Islands) became one of the first to break with this convention when he published The Question of the Language in Corfu. Writing in fluent Demotic prose, Konemenos presented what was in effect a Demoticist manifesto, arguing that the spoken language should become the basis of the national written language.

"Language ... is a means, not an end", he wrote, and should be judged on its effectiveness in conveying meaning and emotion. "Vulgarity and impropriety" are properties of the content, not the language itself; and since even the lógioi–the learned–were by then accepting the use of Demotic in poetry, it had proved capable of conveying even the most sublime concepts. "I believe", he continued, "that our modern language is a perfection of the ancient".

For Konemenos, as for so many others, the language question had a patriotic and spiritual dimension. "All other nations have a present. We do not. ... By despising and renouncing our language, we are despising and renouncing our present".

Two years later, Konemenos published Once More on Language, in which he answered his critics and developed his ideas. To those who complained that his prose did not sound like genuine Demotic speech, he explained that he was trying to develop a "de-regionalized" Demotic. The supporters of Katharevousa had always maintained that the spoken dialects differed so much among themselves that it would be impractical to use Demotic as a written language; Konemenos showed that there was more than enough common ground. "We don't have dialects, but we have idioms".

As for the grammarians, instead of adapting their technical terms to describe the living language, they were trying to alter the language itself to make it conform to their outdated system, "chopping and squeezing the body" to fit the ancient clothes. Finally he gave a Demotic translation of a text on international law written in archaic Katharevousa. Konemenos was one of the first to attempt this sort of exercise, which was to be repeated by other Demoticists as late as the 1960s.

Nevertheless, despite his energy and foresight, Konemenos' work had little immediate impact. Publishing in Corfu (rather than Athens) and working as a consul in Patras, he was perhaps too far from the political and cultural centres in Athens to be taken seriously. However, new political and cultural developments were soon to make Greece much more receptive to Demoticist ideas.

==== Bulgarian Exarchate and the Eastern Question (1870–81) ====
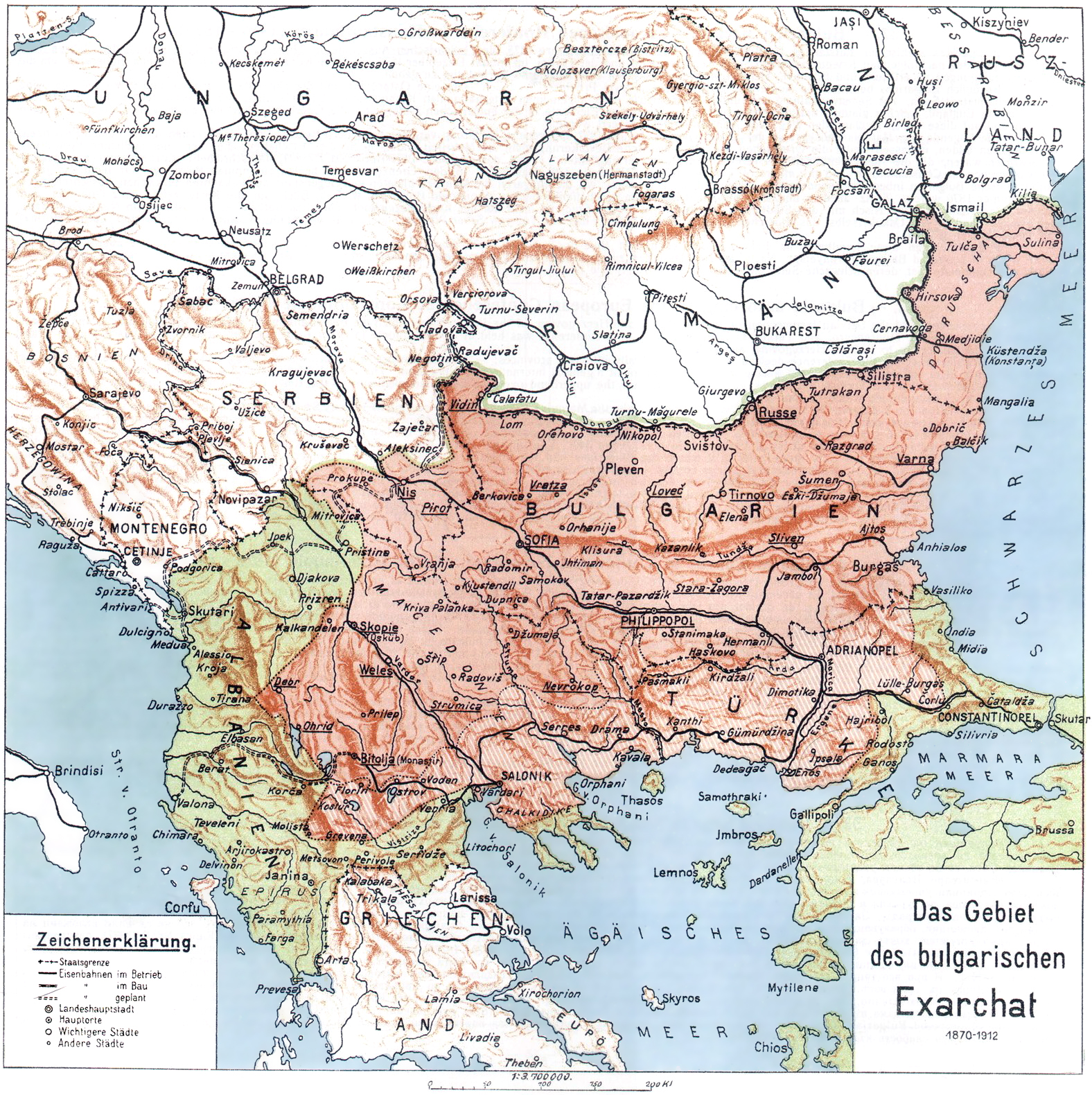
The Bulgarian Exarchate, 1870–1913

The first was the foundation in 1870 of the Bulgarian Exarchate, effectively an independent Bulgarian Orthodox Church, with services held in Church Slavonic rather than archaic Greek.

A few generations earlier it had been possible to hope, as Voulgaris and Kodrikas did, that all the Orthodox believers of the Balkans could form a single political community united by the Orthodox Church and its Ancient Greek language, regardless of the many different vernaculars spoken in the home; but the establishment of the Exarchate marked the end of that dream. A generation of bright young men from all over the (still Ottoman-occupied) Balkans had indeed come to the University of Athens (founded 1837) to study Greek language and culture, but when they returned to their homelands they did not serve as Greek cultural missionaries (although in many cases they continued to correspond with each other in Greek, much as Westerners of the time often did in the then-dominant diplomatic language, French). Instead they founded national movements of their own, promoted the literary and official use of their own spoken languages, and established the use of those languages in church. (Note: Grigor Parlichev is an example. Born in Ohrid (still under Ottoman rule) in 1830, he attended the local Greek school, where he learned Ancient Greek and studied Orthodox liturgical texts. After working for a decade as a teacher of Greek he came to Athens University in 1858, even winning the national poetry competition in 1860 with an Ancient Greek poem. But in 1862, Parlichev began working for the Bulgarian national cause, and after 1870 wrote only in Bulgarian.) This removed yet another justification for the official use of the ancient language in the Greek state; it was clearly about to lose its old status as a common language for Orthodox worship across the Balkans.

On the other hand, the political importance of Demotic had increased. In this time of national awakenings, the language spoken in the home had become much more important in defining ethnicity than the old religious classifications used by the Ottomans. This had happened first in Serbia, then Romania and Bulgaria, and was about to happen in Albania; inevitably the mood spread to Greece too, where actually speaking Demotic Greek began to seem as important as merely possessing the Greek "national consciousness" (εθνικό φρόνημα) on which previous generations had placed such high hopes.

This was also a time for re-drawing borders in the Balkans. For the past century, the European Powers had been engaged with the Eastern Question of how to deal with the slow disintegration of the Ottoman Empire; and following the 1878 Congress of Berlin, the Great Powers in 1881 forced the Ottomans to cede Thessaly to Greece. This brought the northern border closer to the southern border of the newly established autonomous principality of Bulgaria. The two young nations now faced each other across a strip of Ottoman territory inhabited by a patchwork of communities speaking Demotic Greek, Bulgarian, Aromanian, and Albanian.

The Greek, Bulgarian and Romanian governments (Note: But not Albania. There would be no Albanian state until 1912, when this strip of Ottoman territory was finally partitioned in the Balkan Wars.) now began to promote their respective languages and interests by opening new primary schools all over the Ottoman territory. Slav-speaking parents could now send their children to Bulgarian-sponsored schools where they would learn to read and write the language they used at home, and (if their district had joined the Exarchate) in church.

By contrast the Greek-sponsored schools could still offer only Ancient Greek, in a curriculum that had begun to seem unsatisfactory even in Greece itself, and an appeal to a Greek "national consciousness". This was far less successful after 1870 than in the centuries before.

Now that it had come down to a contest of languages, it began to seem that (if only for reasons of political strategy) it might be a good idea to value more highly the Demotic actually spoken by many inhabitants of the disputed territory. In the years following the 1878 Congress, for the first time, a "Demoticist current" began to flow in the Greek political world.

==== Folklore, history and continuity ====
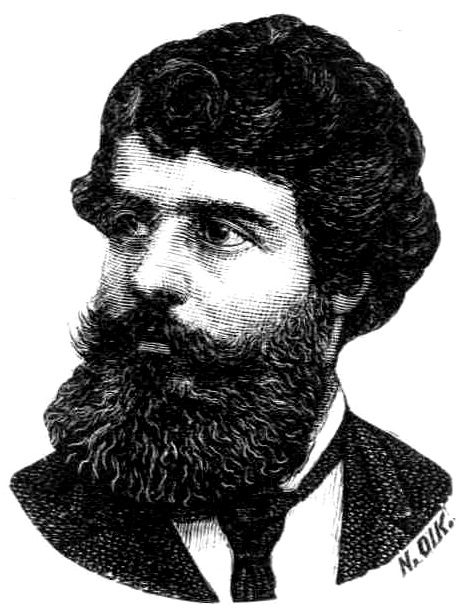
Nikolaos G. Politis in 1888

As early as 1857 some efforts had been made to collect phrases, proverbs, songs, narratives and all kinds of traditions from schoolchildren; but the systematic and scholarly study of folklore was established in Greece by the young Nikolaos G. Politis, when his Study of the Culture of the Modern Greeks was published in two parts in 1871–74. This explicitly linked modern customs to ancient ones.

The study of laografia ('national folklore') swiftly gained momentum among scholars eager to demonstrate the cultural and territorial continuity of the Greek people in their homeland since ancient times. This was not unconnected to the political situation. Just as the creation of Katharevousa had answered the political needs of its time (throwing off the Turkish yoke, erasing the traces of servitude and regaining cultural parity with Enlightenment Europe), so now the laografia movement served the new "national struggle" against the Slav territorial threat in the north.

This new-found enthusiasm for continuity also applied to historians. In 1874, Konstantinos Paparrigopoulos completed his monumental History of the Greek Nation, presenting a unified and continuous story "from Agamemnon to George I" (as Hatzidakis put it later). This gave equal weight to the Classical and the post-Classical (especially Byzantine) periods, which many in Korais' time had dismissed as wasted centuries of subjugation to "Oriental despotism". Now "our medieval kingdom" was embraced as an essential part of the Greek story.

With the newly celebrated continuity of culture and history came recognition of the continuity of the spoken language, and a new respect for Demotic as the true voice of an ancient nation emerging from a time of trials. The poet Kostis Palamas later wrote that Politis' folklore studies had revealed "the fragmented face of the national soul under the masks that [changing] times have forced it to wear". It was around this time that folk songs gradually ceased to be called tragoudia ethnika ('national songs') and became known as dimotika tragoudia ('Demotic songs'), explicitly linking the survival of the 'national soul' with Demotic, and not with Katharevousa.

Greek thinkers were also learning from the national unification movements in Italy and Germany. Inspired by Johann Gottfried Herder and perfected by the Brothers Grimm, the combination of folklore studies with scientific linguistics had proved highly effective in demonstrating German cultural continuity. The same combination would soon be put to work in Greece.

==== Developments in linguistics ====
Linguistics had made considerable advances in the half-century since Korais' time. The decipherment of ancient writing systems, the publication of Grimm's Law of sound-changes in 1822, Bopp's tracing of the inter-relationships of the Indo-European languages, Diez's work on the development of the Romance languages from Vulgar Latin, Schleicher's demonstration of an evolutionary tree of languages, and finally the announcement of Verner's Law in 1875, had all made it clear that the changes a language undergoes as time passes are not simply accumulations of random damage, like copying errors in a manuscript. Instead, the sound-changes are usually exceptionless and other developments often highly systematic. It had become evident that in the long term languages are constantly evolving like living things, rather than simply deteriorating from some perfect state established in a past age. This threw a very different light on the relationship between Demotic and Ancient Greek. (Note: For example, it now appeared that Demotic might have dealt with the gradual disappearance of the dative by simply evolving new prepositions that took other cases; thus σε + accusative had taken over from εν + dative to express 'in'.)

This Neogrammarian school of thought also regarded speech, rather than writing, as the essential root of language; as a rule it is the spoken language that naturally takes the lead in evolution, with written versions following later or not at all. These insights helped to explain why the trickle-down of "pure" grammatical forms in the opposite, "unnatural" direction—from written Katharevousa to spoken Demotic—had been such a spectacular failure.

In addition, the Neogrammarians drew attention to the way in which speakers constantly and instinctively adjust their speech to the usage they hear around them, thus maintaining the coherence and internal consistency of their spoken language across all its speakers at any given time (and keeping the sound-changes exceptionless). This means that spoken languages feel a natural everyday pressure towards internal consistency that written (but un-spoken) languages do not. This too threw some light on the failure of Katharevousa to reach a stable consensus grammar over the two generations since its adoption.

This was the intellectual ground on which the two pre-eminent Greek linguists of the new generation, Hatzidakis and Ioannis Psycharis, would battle for the next few decades: Hatzidakis as the defender of Katharevousa, and Psycharis as the champion of Demotic.

=== Demotic renaissance (1880–88) ===
==== Generation of 1880 ====
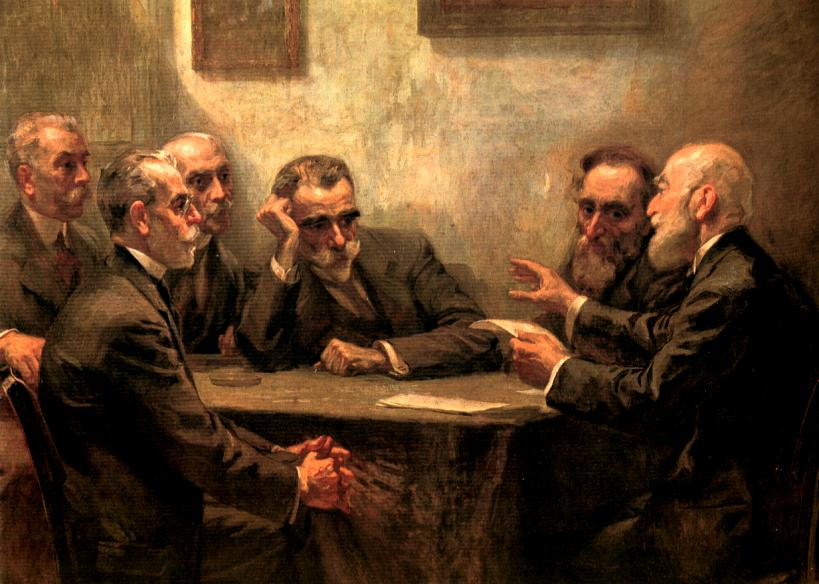
Some of the Generation of 1880 in later years: The Poets (1919) by Georgios Roilos. Drossinis is second from left, in the foreground with clasped hands; Palamas is in the centre, leaning forward on the table.

The literary "Generation of 1880", also called the New Athenian School, made their debut with the publication in 1880 of the first collections of poetry from Georgios Drossinis and Nikos Kampas. In contrast to the First Athenian School poetry of Soutsos and his contemporaries, who had used increasingly archaic Katharevousa, the new work was largely in Demotic; and the poems of Drossinis' next collection, Idylls (1884), are almost all on themes from folklore, informed by the laografia work of his friend Politis.

However, the leading figure of the Generation of 1880 was to be Drossinis' and Kampas' close friend Kostis Palamas, who published his first collection of poems, The Songs of my Homeland, in 1886. All of these were in Demotic. Palamas went on to win the national Filadelfeios poetry prize in 1889, and again in 1890, with more works in Demotic. Within little more than a decade, Katharevousa had been supplanted by Demotic as the preferred language of Athenian poetry.

The press were quick to realize this. Already in 1880 a number of journals (including the prestigious family magazine Estia and the newspaper Akropolis) had opened their pages to poetry in Demotic; and from 1889 onwards, under the editorship of successive New Athenians, Estia became a strong supporter of the Demotic movement.

==== Dissatisfaction with Katharevousa in prose fiction ====
Although poetry was being taken over by Demotic, prose fiction in the 1880s remained almost entirely Katharevousa. (Note: Behold the Man (1886) published in Cephallonia by Laskaratos is one exception. But this was a collection of humorous sketches; the first Demotic novel did not appear until 1896.) The three leading fiction writers of the time, Alexandros Papadiamantis, Georgios Vizyinos and Emmanouil Rhoides, were masters of Katharevousa style. But although non-fiction could be entirely Katharevousa (and in fact largely remained so for many years to come), fiction needed some Demotic, if only for realistic dialogue, and the three writers handled this in different ways.

Papadiamantis became famous for interweaving Katharevousa narration of an almost liturgical style with interior reflections and reminiscences in Demotic, and with dialogue in local dialect. In stories of his own childhood, the adult narrator writes Katharevousa in counterpoint to the Demotic voice of his childhood self, and the difference in language suggests a poignant distance between the little boy and the man he will become. Papadiamantis never expressed any dissatisfaction with Katharevousa as an artistic medium.

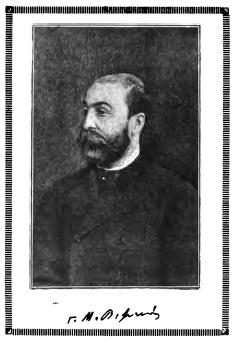
Georgios Vizyinos in 1894, from the Ποικίλη Στοά (Poikile Stoa) magazine

Vizyinos, however, had different attitudes to Katharevousa and to childhood. In one piece he recalled his own confusion and dismay at being forced, early in his school-days, to call an apple tree by the Ancient Greek word μηλέα, instead of the Demotic μηλιά. After being beaten by the schoolmaster he decides on a compromise: apple trees in general can be μηλέα, but the one in the family garden will always be μηλιά to him.

Here Vizyinos (who had risen from very humble beginnings) was one of the first to give a voice to the generations of pupils who had been told when they started school that their names for things were unacceptable, and that they must now learn Ancient Greek words for those same things. This anticipated the work of Fotiadis and the Demoticists of the Educational Association a generation later. Vizyinos himself emphasized the importance of the educational issue; he concluded that "the mania of those who want to teach not the nature of things ... but unfamiliar words ... renders Greek education a Sisyphean labour and condemns the nation to the worst possible death from spiritual starvation! For this reason the question concerning the Greek language is, in my view, ... more vital than the Eastern Question". (Note: Summarized and translated in Mackridge (2009), p. 206. It is not quite clear from Mackridge which of the quoted words come from the 1883 Estia stories and which from the 1885 article.)

In his other works Vizyinos started a trend for placing much of the narrative in the mouths and thoughts of ordinary people, so that most of the writing could be in Demotic, framed by passages in Katharevousa.

Rhoides, by contrast, was known for pure Katharevousa prose, used with precision and cool irony. Coming from a wealthy cosmopolitan background, he had little contact with rural Demotic, and specialized in satirical essays; but he had his own criticisms of Katharevousa, which he was later to set out in detail in The Idols (1893).

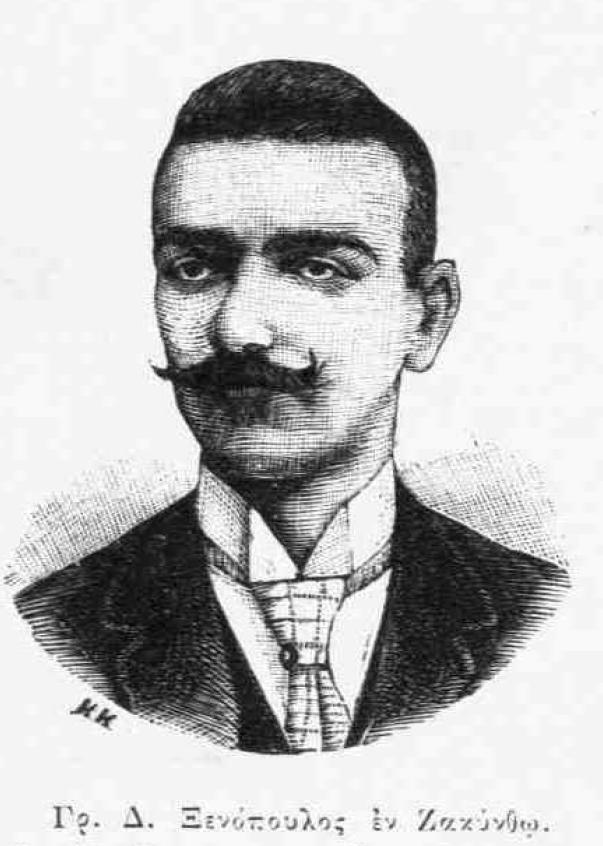
Grigorios Xenopoulos in 1888

Some of the next generation of young prose writers were also unhappy with Katharevousa as an artistic medium. In an 1883 prologue to his first novel, Grigorios Xenopoulos wrote that "the Greek language, or rather that monstrous mixture which the Greeks of today call a language, is an abyss" that causes such difficulties for anyone who wishes to use it that it actually discourages writing altogether.

Shortly afterwards, in his novel Nikolas Sigalos, he put similar sentiments into the musings of a fictional writer: "The devil! ... Call this a language? Is this writing or translating? What have I been doing all this time? Translating into so-called Katharevousa what I am thinking in the vernacular, in my mother tongue. Katharevousa! ... A monstrosity ... !"

Xenopoulos' views carry all the more weight because he was not some easily discouraged amateur; he was later to become one of Greece's most eminent men of letters.

The dissatisfaction expressed by Vizyinos, Xenopoulos, and later by Rhoides was a new development in Greek literary life. Thirty years before, the Athenian establishment had been wholly committed to what A. R. Rangavis in 1853 had called "the dignified formation of the Panhellenic language", even if there was some disagreement over how archaic it should be. But these new criticisms did not come from Ionian provincials or Demotic poets; they were coming from leading Katharevousa prose writers working in the Athenian establishment itself.

Katharevousa was also about to receive more criticism, of a quite different kind, from an even more establishment quarter.

==== Kontos Controversy (1882–4) ====
In 1882 the classical philologist Konstantinos Kontos, a professor at the University of Athens, published Linguistic Observations Regarding Modern Greek, a collection of two hundred "observations" in which he pointed out grammatical errors and semantic sloppiness in the works of other scholars from Voulgaris onwards, including Korais, Doukas and Asopios. Korais himself had intended Katharevousa to be a subset of Ancient Greek, obeying its rules wherever they applied (though in practice some compromise had been necessary); but Kontos demonstrated how even the most learned writers continually broke the most basic rules of Ancient Greek grammar.

Kontos asserted that Korais' compromises were no longer necessary, as the language had "advanced" since his time (by which he meant it had become more archaic, as with the gradual restoration of the dative case), and he never used the term Katharevousa. In his eyes, if it was not up to Ancient Greek standards, it was wrong. Yet he gave no analysis of why these errors might be occurring, or any programme for preventing them; he simply presented a list of the mistakes of other writers.

Kontos' knowledge of Ancient Greek was unrivalled, and many of his "observations" were factually correct. Yet the principal effect of Linguistic Observations ... was to create the impression that the Katharevousa in current use was somehow second-rate, and also impossibly hard to use correctly.

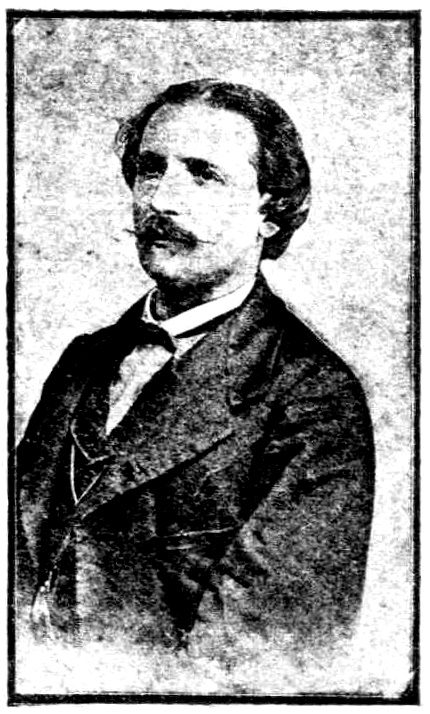
Dimitrios Vernardakis in 1890

Two years later it received an answer, in the form of A Censure of Pseudo-Atticism by Dimitrios Vernardakis, another professor (and aspiring neoclassical dramatist). In this long, rambling book Vernardakis defended the current version of Katharevousa, and criticized Kontos for archaistic nit-picking when he should have been addressing the problems of Greek education. In keeping with his general defence of the status quo, Vernardakis also attacked the language of the new Demotic poets as inauthentic, and untrue to the actual rural Demotic of the "common people". In this he was justified to some extent, because the New Athenian poets were more or less consciously working to create a de-regionalized Demotic for national use; Vernardakis warned against this modern notion, claiming it would corrupt "the language of the people".

In the same year (1884) the young Hatzidakis, now also a professor at Athens University, replied in turn with his Study on Modern Greek, or Trial of the Censure of Pseudo-Atticism in which he defended Kontos for insisting on grammatical correctness. As an outstanding linguist of the new generation, Hatzidakis was well aware of the evolutionary history of Demotic (Note: He had recently made his name with an 1881 paper disproving the so-called Aeolodoric Theory, which held that modern Demotic was an unchanged survival of a hitherto unknown dialect of Ancient Greek. Hatzidakis was able to trace many features of Demotic back to Hellenistic times and thus demonstrate its continuous evolution from the koine of the ancient world.) and recognized that Katharevousa was an artificial construction, a Kunstsprache. But he maintained that since its use was now well established, it should be used correctly and consistently, in line with Ancient Greek models where possible. After all (as he would argue in a later work), Katharevousa "was no more difficult to learn than any foreign language".

He was also well aware of the evolutionary history of the other European languages, and the parallels between Greek and Latin, in particular the part played by Dante Alighieri in transforming the "demotic" Tuscan descendants of Vulgar Latin into literary Italian. Taking the long view, Hatzidakis recognized that the same thing could eventually happen in Greece; he looked forward to the adoption of Demotic for all written purposes, but only after "a Shakespeare or a Dante" had appeared to erect an "outstanding literary edifice" to rank with the Divine Comedy and establish a standard. Hatzidakis maintained this position for the rest of his long life. While admitting the theoretical possibility of eventually using Demotic as a written language, he would never concede that it was ready.

This image of Demotic "still waiting for its Dante" reappeared many times in the next few decades, in the works of many other writers.

It is noteworthy that none of the participants in this controversy (not even Kontos) called for the full resurrection of Ancient Greek, even as an ultimate dream. That hope now belonged to the past. From the new perspective of evolutionary linguistics, it would have seemed as unrealistic as persuading the whole of modern Italy to revert to speaking and thinking in Classical Latin.

==== Rhoides, diglossia, and The Idols ====
Meanwhile, Rhoides had been formulating his own critique of the current state of the Greek language, from his point of view as a master of Katharevousa. Already in 1885 he had argued that it had become impossible to write without being forced to choose between words and grammatical forms that were "either exiled from our written discourse on the grounds that they are vulgar, or archaic and therefore alien to spoken usage".

In 1885, he had also coined the word diglossia to describe the way members of Parliament, for example, used Katharevousa in prepared speeches but switched to Demotic in debate. Rhoides pointed out that it was not simply a matter of spoken versus written forms, since both were being spoken, and on exactly the same topics; nor a matter of social class or educational level, since the same men were using both. Instead of gradually shifting between informal and formal styles or registers, as in other languages, the speakers were switching out of one language and into another, lexically and grammatically distinct, with nothing in between.

In the same year, he began work on a longer treatment of the language question, The Idols, which was substantially complete by 1888. The "idols" of the title were the beliefs of the linguistic purists: that modern spoken Greek was corrupt, poor in vocabulary, and split into dissimilar dialects. Writing in his own precise Katharevousa, Rhoides introduced a wide range of linguistic evidence and coolly demolished each "idol" in turn.

He also returned to his earlier theme, that it was impossible to use Katharevousa to describe simple everyday actions and objects such as food, clothes, furniture and utensils without sounding stilted and unnatural, and that it was therefore unsuited to realistic prose about ordinary life. Viewed in this light, the technique of Papadiamantis, Vizyinos and others—placing much of the description of everyday life and events in quoted Demotic speech and thought—looked less like an artistic choice and more like something forced on them by the deficiencies of Katharevousa.

However, when it came to recommendations on what should be done about this unsatisfactory state of affairs, all Rhoides could suggest was gradual change, for which he used the "vague and unhelpful" term katharismos tis katharevousis [purification of Katharevousa]. (Note: The description "vague and unhelpful" is Mackridge's, on p. 233.)

Though almost complete by 1888, Rhoides' Idols was not finally published until 1893, well after Psycharis' My Journey, which was to transform the Language Question debate. (Note: This is why Psycharis is only mentioned in the epilogue of The Idols.)

=== Impact of Psycharis (1888–97) ===
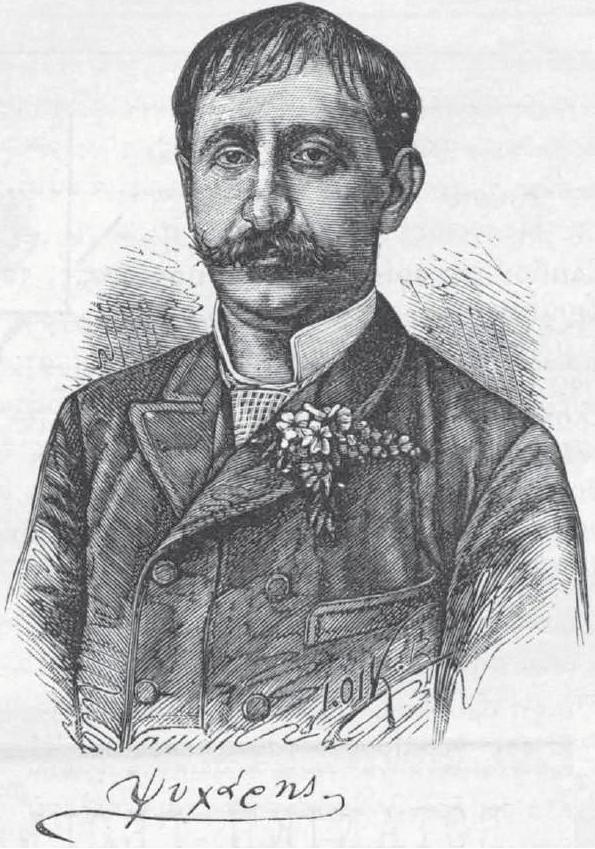
Woodcut portrait of Psycharis in the Ποικίλη Στοά (Diverse Gallery) magazine from 1888

The publication in 1888 of My Journey by Ioannis Psycharis marked a complete break with the earlier style of discussion on the Language Question. Although Psycharis was a leading academic linguist, My Journey was written entirely in Demotic, and strongly advocated the immediate abandonment of Katharevousa and the adoption of Demotic for all written purposes.

At this time Psycharis was assistant to the professor of Greek at the École spéciale des Langues orientales in Paris, and My Journey described an 1886 visit he had made to Constantinople, Chios and Athens. The narrative was interwoven with observations on Greek language, culture and politics; this travelogue form made it easy for Psycharis to use the viewpoint of an interested outsider to observe and comment on things that seemed absurd to him, but were taken for granted by the locals. His central argument was that it is the spoken language that is the true voice of the Greek nation, and that Greece must embrace and reclaim this ancestral language. Only then will it be able to reclaim its ancestral lands.

As a Neogrammarian linguist, Psycharis stressed the importance of observations of actual spoken usage, and urged his fellow scholars to "take the boatman as our teacher ..., and run and study our language at the feet of the tailor and cobbler". (Note: Translated in Mackridge (2009), p. 227)

As a Greek patriot, he also stressed the link between the Language Question and the Eastern Question. In the very first paragraph of his introduction, he declared that: "Language and patrida [homeland] are the same thing. To fight for the homeland or for the national language is one and the same struggle". (Note: Translated in Mackridge (2009), p. 225)

Psycharis was to spend the next few decades promoting and elaborating these principles. He also popularized the use of Rhoides' term diglossia to describe what he regarded as the unhealthy split between the "official" Katharevousa and the "national" spoken language. (Note: Psycharis first used the word in its French form diglossie in an 1885 essay, in which he credited Roïdis with coining the word earlier that year in his Parerga.)

As for Katharevousa itself, Psycharis regarded it as an artificial construction, a distraction from the true course of the Greek language. From a Neogrammarian point of view, he argued that because Katharevousa had been consciously put together from a more or less arbitrary selection of Ancient Greek features, it had no naturally evolving coherent internal structure that could be studied scientifically; so there was no rigorous way of determining if a particular construction was grammatical or not.

Language reform thus remained a concern of the cultural and intellectual elite, and never relied on grass-roots popular support; for example, there never was a mass outcry from working-class parents demanding education in written Demotic for their children, and language reform was never adopted by any political party as a vote-winning policy. This remained true throughout the entire two centuries of the debate; the history of the Language Question is essentially a record of internal argument within the cultural elite.

==== Contemporary reception of My Journey ====
Psycharis had succeeded in putting the idea of remaking the written language firmly on the Greek intellectual agenda, where it would stay for the next century. But (although Rhoides immediately gave it a favourable review) My Journey itself had a mixed critical reception, even from other Demoticists. There was some dispute over linguistic technicalities; there was general disagreement with Psycharis' uncompromising principle of banning all Katharevousa influence; and there was a great deal of discussion about the "ownership" of the written language—who, if anyone, was entitled to make deliberate changes to it.

For example, in 1895 Konemenos, still a committed Demoticist, took issue with some of Psycharis' phonological arguments (Note: As an example, he pointed out that the spoken language of the "common people" did in fact use the consonant cluster /mv/, as in /amvonas/ for pulpit.) and demanded an equal voice, along with "the boatman ... the tailor and the cobbler" in the remaking of the written language. He was also one of many to point out that, despite Psycharis' claim to be an impartial scientific observer of linguistic evolution, many of his word-forms had never been used by any real boatman or cobbler.

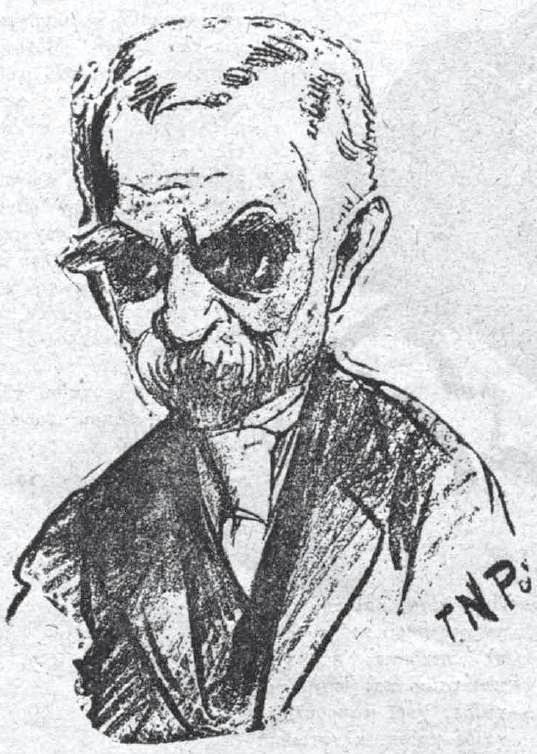
Angelos Vlachos in 1898. Charcoal sketch from Estia.

Angelos Vlachos raised the issue of "language ownership" explicitly in his adjudication speech for the 1891 Filadelfeios prize. Poets, he said, should "content themselves with creating ideas and stop trying to create a language", and refrain from creating new words "according to unprecedented and unheard-of etymological rules". Criticizing an entry from one of Psycharis' early followers, he declared that its language "is not that of folk poetry, it is not that which is commonly spoken by the Greek people, it is not some specific dialect of Greece, yet it is all these things together and something more". (Note: The entry was Agapis Logia, a set of Shakespearian-style sonnets by Argyris Eftaliotis. Summarized in Mackridge (2009), pp. 234,236)

Vlachos was not the only one to argue that written Demotic, while admittedly expressing the "national soul", belonged to the world of the folk songs, and that poets had no business trying to adapt it to high culture or modern needs (Vernadakis had already said something similar). Accordingly, the rules of the Filadelfeios competition were changed in 1892 to specify that entries could still be in either Katharevousa or Demotic, but that the Demotic must now be "the pure language of the folk songs".

Vlachos' speech was published in Estia and provoked many responses, notably from Iakovos Polylas in Our Literary Language (1892). Polylas (originally, like Konemenos, from Corfu in the Ionian Islands) was a veteran Demoticist and editor of Solomos' works, who had already (1875-1881) published a translation of Homer's Odyssey into Demotic verse. While agreeing with Psycharis that Katharevousa was a "makeshift archaic construct", he maintained that all literary languages developed from collaboration between the laos and the logioi (the people and the learned) and that Demotic should welcome Katharevousa words where necessary for "the organic development of the national language". Referring back to Vlachos' description of the new Demotic as being "not that of folk poetry ... yet all these things and something more", Polylas concluded that exactly the same could be said of all the other European literary languages, and that this was just what Greece needed.

It was during these years that the term glossoplastis 'creator of language' gained currency. First used in 1890, it was "a term of praise for poets who were expanding the expressive range of the Demotic language, especially by demonstrating its remarkable capacity for forming new words".

Palamas too challenged both Vlachos and Psycharis in a series of long articles (written in Katharevousa, still the conventional norm for prose, even for Demoticists). He rejected both notions of Demotic "purity": the ideal "pure popular language, rendered immortal by the folk songs" of Vlachos, and the doctrinaire purity of form demanded by Psycharis. Palamas argued that a language is "owned" by the people who actually speak it—"the Creator that gives life" to the language—and that the Poet, as one of these speakers, has a perfect right to use words from any source—Ancient Greek, Katharevousa, or newly minted—as long as they contribute to the "pan-harmonious unity of the poetic language".

Palamas followed these principles in his own Demotic poetry and proved himself an accomplished glossoplastis. It has been estimated that he used more than 400 new words in his collections of 1904 and 1907 alone. (Note: The estimate is by Charalampakis (2006), quoted in Mackridge (2009), p. 242, footnote.)

On the other side of the debate, the proponents of Katharevousa energetically defended the status quo. Between 1890 and 1895 Hatzidakis wrote a series of polemical articles maintaining his usual position that the scholarly community were and are the natural custodians of the written language, quite independently of spoken usage. Significantly, though, it was during these years that the term Katharevousa became the standard way of referring to the version of the written language that he was defending (a decade earlier, Kontos had simply called it written Greek). It was a tacit admission that there were now two forms of written Greek.

There was also some animosity towards Psycharis personally. In an 1893 interview (possibly exaggerated by the interviewer), Papadiamantis was reported as attacking his "monomania", his "psychotic" desire to impose himself as "the creator and teacher of a whole nation", despite his being "a Levantine, ... a Chiot, almost a foreigner, an aristocrat, a Fanariot" who was out of touch with the way ordinary people actually spoke. (Note: Interview given to Bohème (Mitsos Hatzopoulos), and published in To Asty, 26 February – 7 March 1893. Summarized in Mackridge (2009), p. 237)

Among Psycharis' other critics there was much common ground. First, the credibility of his "scientifically derived" word forms was damaged by the fact that he never actually produced a rigorous grammar of the spoken language. He was working on one, but it was still incomplete at the time of his death in 1929, and those parts that were published have been described as "virtually unusable". In the absence of a clear exposition of his methods, many of his choices seemed quite arbitrary.

This would not have mattered if his new words had sounded natural to native speakers; but all too often they did not, and he did not seem to realise it. This may well have been because of his foreign upbringing and the weakness of his own Demotic, which he good-humouredly acknowledged in personal correspondence: "You really must teach me Romaic—it's high time" and "I have an ear in French—and a very fine one to boot ... In Romaic, as luck would have it, I haven't". (At the time, romaiika, ρωμαίϊκα, 'Romaic' was used as a term, originally rather disparaging, for the spoken language of true native-born Greeks, the Romioi.) (Note: Both quotes come from his correspondence with Eftaliotis, translated in Mackridge (2009), p. 219)

The same limitations extended to his fiction writing. Psycharis later published many novels in his version of Demotic, but they were widely considered unconvincing, largely because all the characters spoke like Psycharis himself. In this respect his attempt to teach the new language by example must be considered a failure; he could not demonstrate the full stylistic range that a living language needs (although he himself could not see this—he considered himself the greatest living fiction writer in Greece). It was evident that Psycharis, for all his cultural impact, was not himself a Dante who could remake a language with his own literary genius.

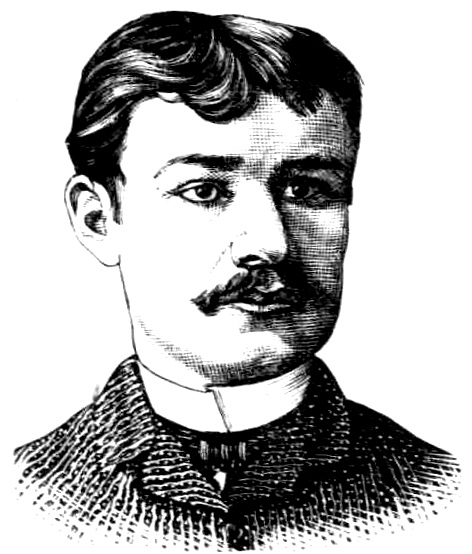
Andreas Karkavitsas in 1888

This was generally acknowledged even by Demoticists. In another 1893 interview, Andreas Karkavitsas—who would publish The Beggar, the first novel written in Demotic, three years later—declared that Psycharis "looks at language from a scientific point of view, and thus he writes Demotic without feeling it". (Note: Interview given to Bohème, and published in To Asty 9 April 1893. Summarized in Mackridge (2009), p. 237)

Psycharis also gave little thought to the practicalities of establishing a new written language. He discouraged the translation of foreign works into his new Demotic, on the grounds that this would somehow dilute the Romios spirit of the young nation. In this he completely disregarded the practical usefulness of translations to the dynamic modern state that other Demoticists were hoping to build.

In his single-minded pursuit of an ideal Greek language to express the soul of the Romios he also disregarded the political reality that many thousands of Greek citizens were not native Greek-speakers at all, for example the many Albanian speakers settled for centuries round Athens itself. This would have become even more of a problem in the Greater Greece that he hoped to create. In the event, it was left to the Demoticists of the Educational Association a generation later to tackle this crucial issue.

==== Influence of Psycharis' personality ====
Psycharis could be a difficult man to work with. "Psycharis was an obstinate and opinionated man, with a passion for grandiose schemes and a psychological need to impose his personality and his views on others. He felt he was practically the only person to have a clear understanding of Greece's problems and a mission to solve them more or less single-handed. ... Whenever his views were politely questioned by his allies or directly challenged by his enemies, he dug his heels in and consistently refused to acknowledge that any alternative view might have an iota of justification"-

In fact Psycharis regarded any opposition as a personal attack; on one occasion his combative nature even led him to challenge Hatzidakis to a duel.

He was also determined to claim sole credit for founding the Demoticist movement. Retrospectively summing up his own career in 1919, he declared that "Psycharis is to demoticism what Marx is to socialism". In My Journey itself, he claimed to be the first person ever to write in Demotic prose, ignoring the Ionian writers from Manousos and Konemenos onwards; "... in his desire to be totally original he failed to give due credit to the work of the post-Solomos writers from the Ionian Islands, whom he no doubt felt to be rivals". This may be connected with his exclusion of any Ionian influence from his version of Demotic.

Psycharis divided the world into allies and enemies, with nothing in between, and he could be very dismissive and patronizing about anyone other than his closest allies. "Even the Romaic language doesn't possess words to express how much I'm disgusted by Romiosyni " who he felt were insufficiently enthusiastic about his programme. As for the literary establishment: "Papadiamantis. Never heard of him. Who is he and what has he written?" At the time, Papadiamantis was widely considered to be Greece's leading fiction writer. (Note: Both quotes come from his correspondence with Eftaliotis, translated in Mackridge (2009), pp. 218–20)

These attitudes inevitably drove away people who might have been allies, and divided the Demoticist forces. They also provoked additional opposition. Overall, Psycharis might be considered something of a double-edged weapon for the Demoticist cause. "While My Journey was perhaps what was needed to awaken Greek intellectual leaders from their torpor, Psycharis' persistence in his uncompromising attitude towards the specific language variety he proposed, as well as to the language question in general, provoked an extreme reaction that delayed the resolution of the Katharevousa-Demotic conflict for several decades".

This extreme reaction took some time to develop, however, and only gathered real strength after the turn of the century. For the first few years, buoyed by a sense of optimism in the country as a whole, the debate was good-humoured and constructive.

==== Psycharis' followers: Eftaliotis and Pallis ====
Psycharis did more than cause a stir among established writers. His energy and charisma also recruited dedicated new followers from outside the literary establishment, particularly among the Greek diaspora—men who, like himself, lived and worked outside Greece for most of their lives. Notable among these were Argyris Eftaliotis and Alexandros Pallis.

In 1887, Cleanthis Michailidis, then working abroad for the Ralli Brothers trading company, visited his native island of Lesbos after an absence of twenty years. The next year he read My Journey. The two experiences together inspired him to become a Demotic writer under the pen-name Argyris Eftaliotis. The first of his Island Stories appeared in Estia in 1889, and the whole collection was published in 1894, establishing him as one of a new generation of Demotic prose writers.

But Eftaliotis was more than just a short story writer (and a poet, whose entries for the Filadelfeios prizes earned some praise). He became one of the most fervent supporters of Psycharis and the two men carried on a voluminous correspondence, later edited and published.

The third member of Psycharis' "triumvirate" was Alexandros Pallis, a close acquaintant of Eftaliotis. Like Eftaliotis, Pallis worked for the Ralli Brothers in Manchester, Liverpool and Bombay; his career in the company was long and successful, and he eventually became a partner and director. He used some of his considerable wealth to fund various Demotic literary activities for the next few decades, including work by Palamas, Eftaliotis, Xenopoulos and Karkavitsas.

Pallis also published his own work, starting in 1892 with the first part of his translation of the Iliad; this was more uncompromisingly Demotic than Polylas' earlier Odyssey. A decade later he was also to achieve some notoriety when his Demotic translation of the New Testament helped to spark the gospel riots of 1901 in Athens.

Notably, Psycharis, Eftaliotis and Pallis while all born on Greek soil and unfailingly patriotic, all spent much of their working lives in French- and English-speaking circles where diglossia was unknown and it was taken for granted that people wrote and spoke in the same language. This may have contributed to their shared perception that Greek diglossia was an exception, a problem that they could solve by energetic literary intervention.

==== Black '97: Change in national mood ====
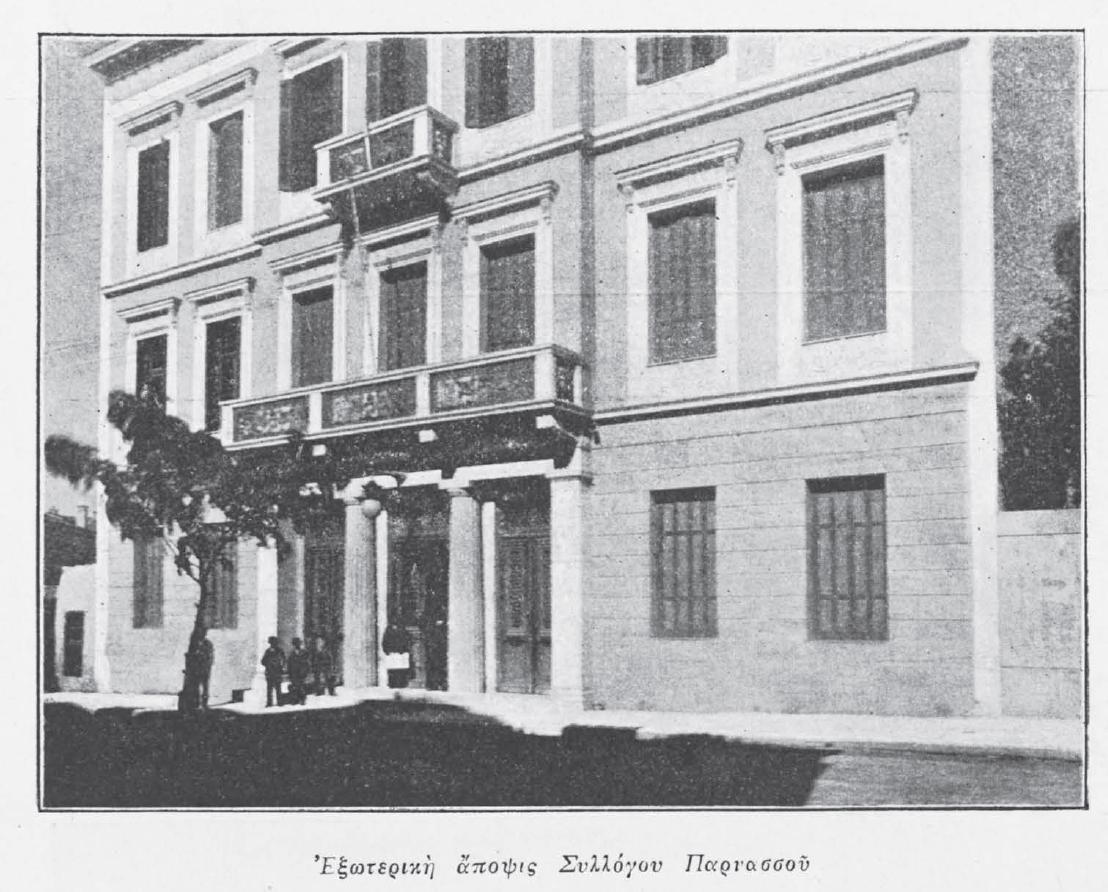
The Athens home of the Parnassos Literary Society in 1896

The good humour of the debate in the early years after the advent of My Journey was demonstrated in 1893 when the prestigious Parnassos Literary Society invited Psycharis to give a talk on the subject of Demotic. The Society served as a kind of informal Academy, and on this occasion the audience included the king, the queen, and two princes. The talk went well, and Psycharis concluded by returning to the image of Greek waiting for its Dante. The folk songs, he said, were "like an anonymous Dante", and could provide all the inspiration necessary for a rebirth of the written language.

Reminiscing later about the event, Psycharis recalled that some of the eminent guests had been pleasantly surprised to find that they could understand him so well; they had evidently been misled by his reputation into thinking he would be using mainly words of his own invention. Later on, when the talk was published in Estia, they were also struck by the novelty of seeing an article completely written in Demotic prose. In 1893 this was still quite new.

Demotic received yet another sign of official esteem and recognition in 1896, when Palamas's "Olympic Hymn", with words in Demotic, was performed with great fanfare at the opening ceremony of the first of the modern Olympic Games in Athens. It seemed that Demotic poetry had now become completely accepted.

Meanwhile, some of the younger novelists were joining the Demotic side. In 1896, Karkavitsas published The Beggar, the first novel to be written entirely in Demotic, in instalments. It was successful enough to be released in book form the following year. This was not just an experiment, but a true change of heart. His first novel The Slender Maiden, published in instalments in 1890, had been written in Katharevousa, but when it was reissued in book form in 1896 he added a preface apologising for his earlier choice of language. It is significant that he presented the change as a switch between two forms of language, and not merely an adjustment of register to use fewer archaisms. The idea that there were now two rival forms of written Greek had taken root by 1896, and it seemed that the literary tide might be beginning to turn in favour of Demotic prose. (Note: Karkavitsas was not the only author to offer such an apology. In 1893, Xenopoulos had published Margarita Stefas, written in Katharevousa, in instalments; but when it was later reissued in book form in 1906, he added a preface apologising for its "miserable hyper-Katharevousa ... which persistently translates the most everyday objects" and warning readers that they would have to translate back as they read.)

In 1897, however, there came a new political development. Early in that year the Greek government embarked on military action against the Ottoman Empire, starting in Crete but developing into an attempt to conquer the strip of Ottoman territory to the North by force.

The result came as a most unwelcome surprise. The Greek armed forces (which had not seen action for some seven decades) performed poorly against the Ottoman troops (who were more numerous, better armed, and advised by a German military mission). The short Greco-Turkish War (1897) ended in defeat and national humiliation.

The episode became known as Black '97, and the mood of the nation darkened.

=== Years of conflict (1897–1903) ===
In the long term, the humiliation of 1897 delivered a salutary shock to the Greek system. The governing classes eventually rose to the challenge, enacted some necessary reforms, and were rewarded by success in the Balkan Wars of 1912–13. "Greece's military defeat made many Greek intellectuals feel the need to rethink the ideological and linguistic basis of their national education and written culture, and it provided a boost to the Demoticists and their sympathizers, who argued that the time was ripe for the now dilapidated archaistic edifice to be replaced by a new, realistic Greek national ideology based on practical education and genuine popular tradition rather than on revivalism".

This constructive response, however, took some years to develop. In the immediate aftermath of the disaster all sides were more concerned with assigning blame. The reformers accused the militarists of incompetence; in their turn, the old guard and the militarists claimed to have been undermined by shadowy forces, probably involving plots by foreigners. "The population as a whole became disillusioned, charges were hurled in all directions, recriminations proliferated like a plague and scapegoats were sought even among those least responsible". (Carabott 1993 p. 118) In this corrosive atmosphere the language debate became more rancorous and more personal.

It was in 1898 that the word malliaroi ('hairy') was first used as a jocular term for Demoticists, particularly the extreme Demoticists on Psycharis's wing of the movement, because of their (alleged) habit of wearing their hair long. The term remained in use for the next century, in every medium from cartoons to patriarchal encyclicals, with writers and their works being assessed according to their degree of 'hairiness'. Before 1898, the same scale had been described more politely as 'Hellenic' at one end and 'Romaic' at the other. (Note: According to Xenopoulos, the term first appeared in print in Estia on 26 November 1898, after being used in an Athens café by the Cretan writer Ioannis Kondylakis. By 1911 the usage was already entrenched enough to be used in an encyclical issued by Patriarch Ioakeim and the Holy Synod of the Ecumenical Patriarchate on 16 March 1911, demanding "protection from any malliaros or vulgar influence".)

Before long, the name-calling had spread to both sides of the debate. (Note: As a small sample: Proponents of Katharevousa denounced proponents of Demotic as μαλλιαροί ('hairy, furry'), αγελαίοι ('gregarious, social; vulgar'), and χυδαϊσταί} ('speakers of slang, plebeians, vulgarians'), while the proponents of Demotic called their enemies γλωσσαμύντορες ('defenders of language, purists'), σκοταδιστές ('obscurantists', or more or less 'those in spiritual darkness'), αρχαιόπληκτοι ('ancient-maniacs'), μακαρονισταί ('imitators of archaic languages', 'macaronic people'), or συντηρητικοί ('conservatives').)

The educational system was in an alarming state and completely ineffective: The children were completely unable to express themselves in the unfamiliar formal language, which severely harmed their speech acquisition instead of educating them.

Orthodox Bishop Fan Noli, who translated into Demotic works of Shakespeare and Henrik Ibsen, emphasized the necessity for a people's language and recalled in his memoirs that because of Katharevousa "there were humorous scenes in a comedy and it happened that no one laughed".

During the years following 1897 Greco-Turkish War, two cases of riots as a result of reactions to the translation of texts into the Demotic Greek occurred: the Gospel riots in 1901, resulting in 11 deaths and the Oresteia riots in 1903, with two deaths.

=== 1903–22 Demoticism in education and reform ===
==== Fotiadis' perspective ====
In 1902 Fotis Fotiadis, personal physician to the Ottoman Sultan (and therefore secure enough to risk controversy) had published The Language Question and our Educational Renaissance, the first book to argue for educational reform based on Demotic. Claiming that it was easier for a Greek child to learn a foreign language than Katharevousa, he called for Demotic to be established as the official language of the Greek state, education, and law.

Writing as a doctor and a father, he presented a child's view of contemporary Greek education: from the start, the pupils are told that they have been using the "wrong" language, and are made to spend much of their time simply learning new "correct" Katharevousa words and expressions. As a result, "... their minds become confused and disordered, and they are unable to do anything in a natural manner, instead becoming self-conscious and hesitant, not only in their linguistic expression but in everything else they do". He argued for more than simply switching to Demotic: he believed that self-development should be the priority in education, and that national self-awareness would follow. To encourage this, he urged that "national poetry" and "popular music" (meaning rural Demotic folk poetry and folk music), which reveal the "soul of the people", should become an essential part of the curriculum.

He also emphasized the role of women in language reform. He declared that children as language-learners are "an inexhaustible treasure for the nation", and that women, as their mothers, are "... the keyholders of the language. It is they that we must win over in every way ..."

==== National Language Society ====
Fotiadis was not alone. In 1904 the National Language Society was founded to promote Demotic in education and public life generally, the first organized group to do so. At the inaugural meeting the poet Kostis Palamas memorably contrasted the demotic and Katharevousa versions of the simple sentence "My father died". While the Demotic "Πέθανε ὁ πατέρας μου" takes root in one's heart, in one's very being, he argued, the Katharevousa version "Απέθανεν ὁ ἐμὸς πατήρ" is like a piece of clothing that can be discarded. The Demotic "has grown organically as the green branch of our national linguistic tree", while the Katharevousa is "the dead branch ..., which has been nailed to the linguistic trunk by willpower alone".

The Society soon broke up, over disagreements about which version of Demotic to promote. But "educational Demoticism" was now gathering momentum, along with the ground-swell of reform triggered by the humiliation of 1897.

==== Skliros and the Noumas debate ====
In 1907, Georgios Skliros published Our Social Question, the first Marxist manifesto in Greek. He "argued that the ruling class was not willing to listen to the Demoticists' message because it wanted to keep people in ignorance. ... Thus, whereas most Demoticists had hitherto envisaged reform from above, Skliros promoted revolution from below".

This work was significant not just for introducing an element of class warfare into the language question (for the first time) but also for prompting a long and notable debate in the Demoticist magazine Noumas (1907–1909). This pitted "bourgeois demoticists who believed that reforming the language of Greek education would automatically lead to a liberalization of Greek society" against "socialists who argued that social reform or revolution was a necessary prerequisite for the solution of the language question".

But as important as the argument was the language in which it was conducted. Although Skliros's book was in simple Katharevousa, the Noumas debate was published entirely in Demotic. The participants spent hardly any time arguing linguistic details; they simply used whichever version of Demotic they felt most comfortable writing. This variety (Note: As an example, for 'evolution', "some participants followed Psycharis in using recently coined Demotic terms such as ξετυλιξιά, while others preferred to make the already existing purist term ἐξέλιξις conform to Demotic morphology as ἐξέλιξη"—which is the form that survives today.) proved to be no barrier to communication and the argument was "carried on at a remarkably high level, in both intellectual and personal terms". By the end of the debate, it was clear that Demotic prose was now a tool quite capable of handling political and historical discussion on any level.

==== Delmouzos and the Volos girls' school ====
In 1908 liberal educationalist Alexandros Delmouzos introduced the use of Demotic as the language of instruction in the newly founded Municipal Girls' High School of Volos and thereby achieved considerable improvement in test scores and pupil satisfaction. Katharevousa was still on the curriculum, but for the first time in a Greek school the girls were encouraged to express themselves freely in written Demotic.

Reminiscing a few years later, Delmouzos related how the girls moved from a state of ragiadismos (enslavement: a term implying the mentality of subjection to the Turks during the Ottoman period) to "spiritual/intellectual and moral xesklavoma" (liberation). Putting aside Katharevousa, a "mask for the soul", they were able to "externalise their inner logos".

In spite of its success, clerics and conservatives condemned the reform and protested vehemently against the school, which was forced to close in 1911. Germanos Mavromatis, bishop of Demetrias in Magnesia and a leader of the local opposition, declared that: "In the conscience of all the people, demoticism, anarchism, socialism, atheism and freemasonry are one and the same", and Delmouzos was even falsely accused of sexually molesting some of the pupils. In 1914 he and some of his colleagues were brought to trial in Nafplion, accused of spreading atheism, but were quickly cleared of all charges for lack of evidence.

The fact that the pupils were girls played a part in attracting opposition. "It is clear that there was a strong anti-feminist feeling behind the accusations against him—a feeling that women should not be too highly educated".

==== Pinelopi Delta's books for children ====
Meanwhile, outside the classroom Pinelopi Delta, Greece's first best-selling children's author, had begun to publish her historical adventure stories written in Demotic. In correspondence with Fotiadis, Delta had insisted that children needed not only school readers but entertaining books, and she made a point of writing in the simple Demotic used by the children themselves.

Her first two books For the Fatherland (Gia tin Patrida (1909)) and In the Time of the Bulgar-Slayer (Ton Kairo tou Voulgaroktonou (1911)) are adventures set among the defenders of the Macedonian frontier in the heroic days of the Orthodox Byzantine Empire. With a theme like this she could hardly be accused of spreading atheism or undermining the nation, and she was allowed to publish freely. Her work became immensely popular, and accustomed a generation of Greek children to reading Demotic prose for pleasure.

==== Educational Association ====
In 1910 the liberal reformer Eleftherios Venizelos came to power for the first time, and in the same year the Educational Association was founded. This had a much narrower focus than the defunct National Language Society: the Association aimed at the introduction of Demotic into primary education. One of its declared educational goals was "to render children conscious of the grammatical rules that came unconsciously to their lips ..." Its founding members included Fotiadis, Delmouzos, many prominent literary figures, and some promising young politicians; within a year it also included twenty members of parliament.

Association members also questioned the value of spending time teaching Ancient Greek in primary school. Linguist and educationalist Manolis Triantafyllidis (who would later play a major role in producing Demotic readers, grammars and dictionaries) argued that "children emerged from school able to say 'nose', 'ears', 'pig', 'horse' and 'house' in Ancient Greek but without having broadened their repertoire of concepts".

Triantafyllidis, Delmouzos and the philosopher and educationalist Dimitris Glinos soon became the leading lights of the Association, effectively supplanting the diaspora-based group surrounding Psycharis, Eftaliotis and Pallis.

==== Opposition to Demoticism ====
All this activity inevitably aroused vocal opposition from the Katharevousa establishment, which in 1911 led not only to the closure of the Volos school, but also to the insertion into the new constitution of a clause declaring Katharevousa to be the official language of Greece. (Note: This was the first time that the language of the state had been specified in the constitution itself. The clause was later dropped from the constitution of 1927, reinstated alongside the 1911 constitution itself in 1935, preserved in the new constitution of 1952, and modified in the new Junta-written constitution of 1968 (which stated Katharevousa was not only the "official language of the state", but also "of education", but also removed the prohibition on "any intervention aimed at corrupting it"), before being finally dropped in the 1975 constitution, Greece's current.) Article 107 stated that "the official language of the State is that in which the constitution and the texts of Greek legislation are drawn up; any intervention aimed at corrupting it is forbidden". This ingenious wording managed to specify Katharevousa without needing to define it.

It was during this constitutional debate that Georgios Mistriotis, one of the loudest opponents of Demotic, produced one of his characteristic denunciations: "the language of the vulgarists is unusable in both poetry and prose. Since poetry seeks out beauty, the mutilations, the vulgarities and mire of barbaric words are incapable of producing a linguistic work of art, just as one cannot build a Parthenon out of filthy materials".

By contrast Georgios Hatzidakis, professor of linguistics at Athens University (and one of the most authoritative linguists of modern Greece), while no less opposed to Demoticism, adopted a more considered approach. "Like other purists, Hatzidakis rejected the claim that there was a common spoken language, arguing that spoken Greek was fragmented into dialects and therefore unsuitable for written communication". "His chief argument against Demoticism, however, was a purely conservative one ... He claimed that by his time, Katharevousa had become the written medium of communication throughout the Greek-speaking world, whereas each Demoticist wrote in a different language, each of which was characterized by anomalies. After all the efforts of learned Greeks to develop the written language over the centuries, he argued, it would be absurd, if not impossible, to abandon it and start all over again".

==== 1917 reforms ====
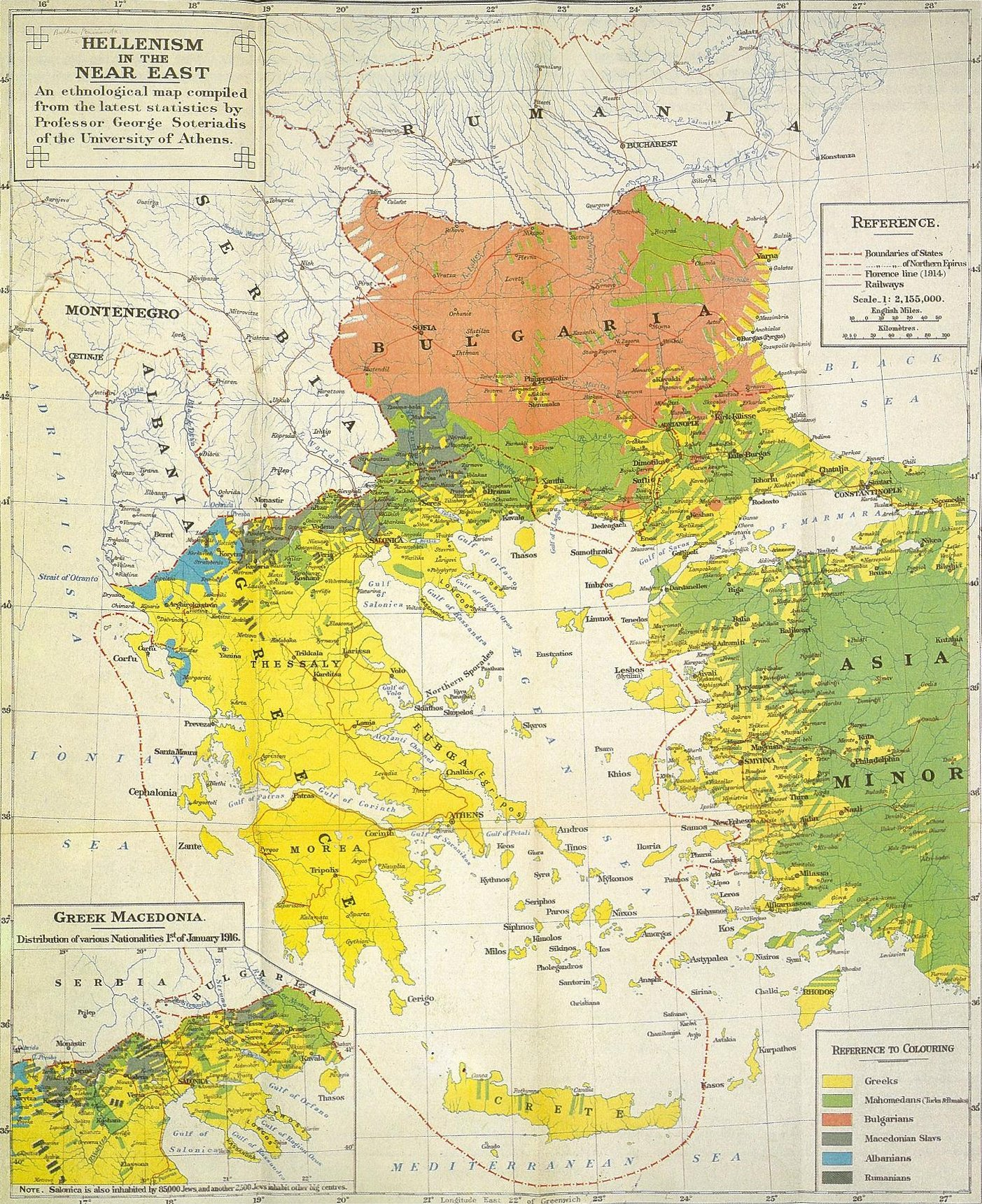
The Greek Kingdom and the Greek diaspora in the Balkans and western Asia Minor, according to a 1919 map submitted to the Paris Peace Conference.

Against this opposition the Association made little progress until 1917. But in the intervening years Greece had greatly expanded its territory in the successful Balkan Wars, and when Eleftherios Venizelos assumed power again in the aftermath of the National Schism his position was strong enough to push through reform. Triantafyllidis, Delmouzos and Glinos were appointed to senior positions in the Ministry of Education. The teaching of Ancient Greek was removed from primary schools. Demotic alone was to be taught in the first four years, and in parallel with Katharevousa in the last two, while new school readers "in the common spoken [Demotic] language" were introduced for the early years.

This programme was all the more politically acceptable because many felt that reformed primary education would help to integrate the newly conquered Macedonian territories into the Greek nation. In the past, the traditional primary combination of lessons on Ancient Greek, in a classroom using Katharevousa, had proved less than effective in Hellenizing non-Greek-speaking populations, even the Arvanite minority settled in the area around Athens itself.

The 1917 reforms were a turning-point for the language question. Except for a temporary setback in 1920-23, Demotic would never again lose its foothold in the first few years of primary education.

==== Coexistence and competition ====
In the adult world too it was now evident that written Demotic prose was here to stay, and even its opponents began to give some thought to possible terms of coexistence, with Katharevousa and Demotic being allotted separate spheres of influence. In 1911 the parliamentary committee investigating the language question had referred to "the development of modern Katharevousa as the means for the expression of thought, but simultaneously the evolution and predominance of the vernacular in the expression of emotion". By 1920 even Hatzidakis was comparing "the learned written tradition as patroparadotos (handed down by the father)" with "the popular tradition as mitrodidaktos (taught by the mother). It seemed that the two versions of the language were now competing on much more equal terms than before.

However, while the Demoticists had already made great progress towards making Demotic a universal language by perfecting its "expression of thought", the other side was having less success in developing "expression of emotion" in Katharevousa. "Outside literature, the purists failed to develop a lively and interesting style, replete with vivid images and metaphors. This condemned non-literary Katharevousa to remain little more than a utilitarian instrument for the expression of facts and ideas, with no creative dimension and no emotional colouring. That is why it was suitable for use as a bureaucratic language. Hatzidakis, for instance, writes in a style that appears to carry the weight of objective academic authority, whereas the discourse of Demoticists such as Psycharis is full of both humour and metaphor, and it delights in expressing its authors' emotions".

==== 1921 temporary reversal ====
Even in the primary schools, however, the victory of Demotic was by no means a foregone conclusion. When Venizelos lost the election of 1920, the educational reforms were temporarily thrown into reverse. The three Association members resigned from the Ministry of Education, and in 1921 a new Ministry committee recommended that the 1917 school textbooks be burned (though in the event they were simply withdrawn). Its report particularly objected to the use in examples of 'vulgar' words such as kafes for coffee: "All the mire of the streets, everything foreign, barbaric and vulgar that has ever been introduced into the mouths of the lowest social strata, has been fondly picked up and imposed as the form and model of the language of primary school". But this backlash lasted only until 1922, when the disastrous outcome of the Asia Minor Campaign produced a rapid swing back to the Venizelist (and pro-Demotic) Liberals.

=== Katharevousa under the Colonels (1967–74) ===
On 21 April 1967 a group of right-wing military officers seized power in a coup d'état and established the regime of the Colonels. Under the Colonels, the language question entered its final stage. The link between Katharevousa and authoritarian government became stronger than ever, and diglossia was enforced as rigorously as possible. In 1968, Katharevousa was made the official language of the state, including education; Demotic was banned from schools except for the first three years of primary classes, and even there the Demotic used was altered to make it as much like Katharevousa as possible.

Many academics were dismissed from their posts, including professors at the University of Thessaloniki who were open supporters of Demotic.

In 1972, the Armed Forces General Staff published a widely available free booklet under the title National Language which extolled the virtues of Katharevousa and condemned Demotic as a jargon or slang that did not even possess a grammar. The existing Demotic grammar textbooks were dismissed as inconsistent and unteachable, while the Demoticists themselves were accused of communism and working to undermine the state.

This booklet essentially tried to revive the old argument that—even with an expanded vocabulary largely derived from Katharevousa—Demotic lacked the sophisticated grammatical structures necessary to express complex meaning; but after a century of Demotic prose literature, and indeed sixty years of school textbooks written in Demotic, it was hard to make this seem convincing. The booklet itself came to represent what some identified as a "Katharevousa mentality", characterized by "cliches, empty rhetoric, and the pretentious display of lexical and grammatical virtuosity".

Katharevousa had by now become so closely identified with the Colonels that when their unpopular regime collapsed in July 1974, support for Katharevousa and enforced diglossia crumbled with it, never to recover. The new democratic government of Konstantinos Karamanlis then set about language reform for one last time.

=== Resolution and the end of diglossia (1976) ===
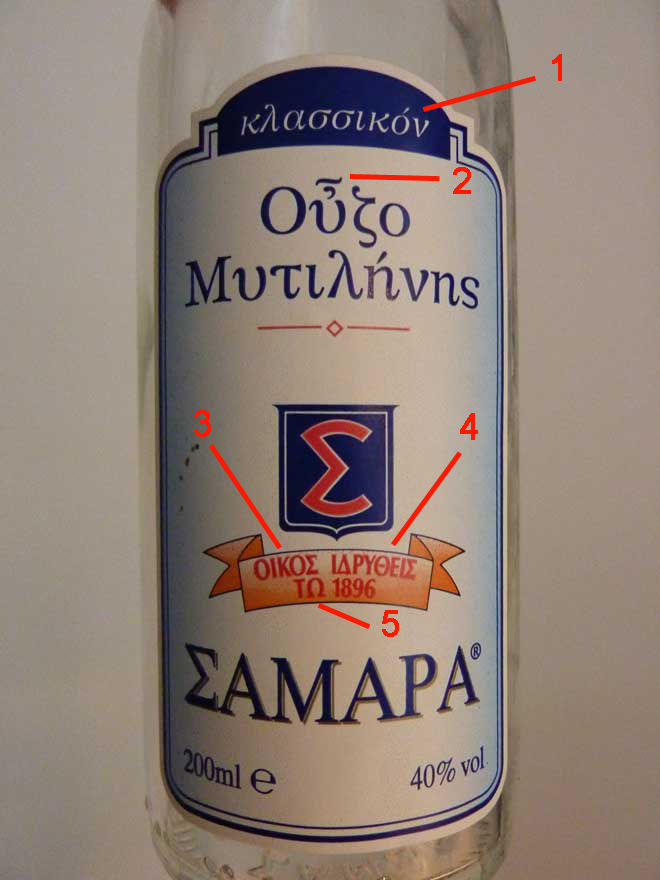
Archaic features on the label of a 21st century ouzo bottle. 1. Adjective κλασσικόν: ending in -ν. 2. Polytonic spelling: Οὖζο. 3. Vocabulary: οίκος. 4. Participle Aorist Passive: ιδρυθείς. 5. Dative (of) the year 1896: ΤΩ

The Greek language question was finally laid to rest on 30 April 1976, when Article 2 of Law 309—still written in Katharevousa—stipulated that Modern Greek should be the sole language of education at all levels, starting with the school year 1977–78. This law defined Modern Greek as:

... the Demotic that has been developed into a Panhellenic instrument of expression by the Greek People and the acknowledged writers of the Nation, properly constructed, without regional and extreme forms.

However, this Demotic was far from the "vulgar grocers' language" of two centuries before. It had absorbed elements of Katharevousa and evolved into what is now generally called Standard Modern Greek or SMG (to distinguish it from Modern Greek, which covers all Greek spoken since the fall of Constantinople in 1453). The folksy neologisms popularized by Psycharis had been largely trimmed away again (these were the "extreme forms" deprecated in Law 309), and henceforward in SMG new words would usually be coined the Katharevousa way, using ancient models.

The result has been that with SMG, "the Greeks of today have the best of both worlds, since their contemporary language offers them potentially the most expressive and productive features of both Demotic and Katharevousa"; and that now "People can use this language without political implications or personal risk, and the old embarrassment stemming from uncertainty about 'correct' written usage is largely a thing of the past".

Law 309 was effectively irreversible, since it would soon produce a generation who could not even read Katharevousa, let alone write or speak it, and this spelled the end for diglossia in Greece. In 1977 SMG was officially recognized as the language of administration, and over the next decade the entire legal system converted to SMG, under the guidance of the "Committee for Demotic", chaired by Emmanouil Kriaras.

Finally in 1982 the newly elected socialist government of Andreas Papandreou signed a presidential decree imposing the monotonic written accent system on education. This simplified scheme uses only two diacritical marks: the tonos ΄ to mark the stressed vowel, and the diaeresis ¨ which serves (as in English and French) to indicate separated vowel sounds.

However this final change was not universally popular, and some (non-educational) writers and publishers still continue to use the traditional polytonic system, employing up to nine different diacritical marks, often with several in each word and sometimes up to three on the same vowel (for example ᾧ).

The end of mandatory Katharevousa (and the consequent diglossia) was, however, welcomed by almost all. "When the reign of Katharevousa came to an end in 1976, many Greeks felt, in their everyday lives, a kind of linguistic liberation and a greater sense of personal and national self-respect at the realization that the language they had imbibed with their mothers' milk was not only something to be cherished but something to be proud of ..."

Writers, too, who had switched from Katharevousa to Demotic in their work often reported "... a sense of liberation, a sense that at last they could express themselves freely, without the restrictions of a lexical and grammatical rigidity imposed from outside".

But the effort spent on creating and promoting Katharevousa had not been entirely wasted. "With hindsight, we can see that the role of Katharevousa was to enrich the written (and to some extent the spoken) language of modern Greece. Yet it had clearly served its linguistic purpose and had begun to outlive its usefulness decades before it ceased to be the official language".

== See also ==
- History of Greek
- New Culture Movement – initiated the shift to written vernacular Chinese
- Norwegian language conflict – a similar, ongoing dispute in Norway
