= Ikos =

Ikos may refer to:

- Ikos, a stanza within a kontakion, a form of hymn originating in the 6th century
- Ikos (island), an island in the Aegean Sea, also known as Alonnisos or Alonissos
- IKOS Systems, an American defunct electronic design automation company

== See also ==
- IKO, airport code for Nikolski Air Station in Alaska
- Iqos, a brand name for a line of electronic cigarette products
- Oikos (disambiguation), an ancient Greek term for "household", and related usages
- Order of Ikkos, a coaching award for U.S. Olympic and Paralympic personnel
