= Glinos =

Glinos may refer to:

- 7124 Glinos, a main-belt asteroid named after Tom Glinos
- Dimitris Glinos (1882–1943), a Greek philosopher, educator and politician
- Tom Glinos (born 1960) Canadian amateur astronomer
