= Ioannis Psycharis =

Russian-born French philologist

Yiannis Psycharis
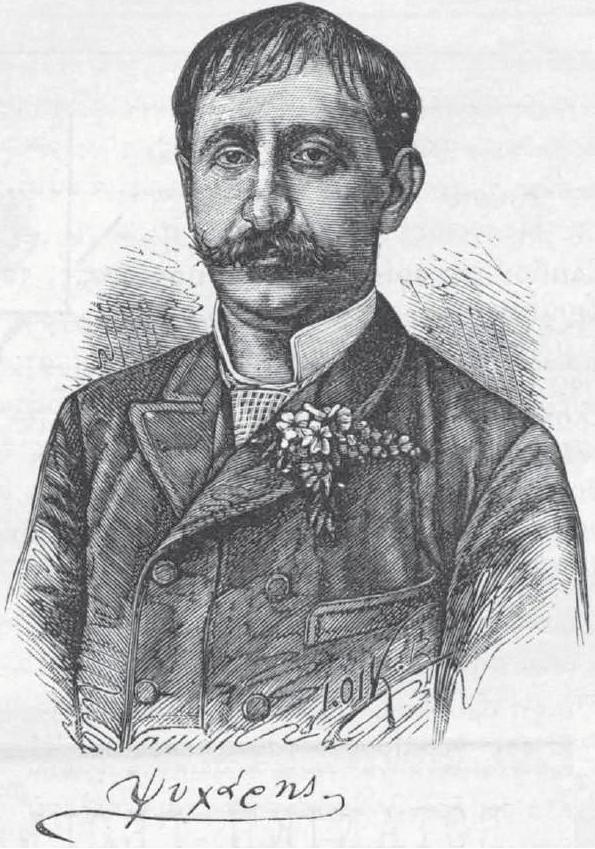
- Woodcut portrait of Jean Psychari in the Ποικίλη Στοά magazine from 1888
- Born: 15 May 1854; Odessa, Russian Empire
- Died: 29 September 1929 (aged 75); Paris, France
- Occupation: Author
- Spouse: Noémie Renan
- Relatives: Ernest Renan (father-in-law)

Ioannis (Yiannis) Psycharis (Greek: Ιωάννης (Γιάννης) Ψυχάρης; French: Jean Psychari; 1854–1929) was a Russian-born philologist who was much of his life a national of France. He was of Greek descent. He was also a writer and a promoter of Demotic Greek.

== Biography ==
Psycharis was born on 15 May 1854 in Odessa (in modern-day Ukraine, then part of the Russian Empire), in a merchant family of Chiot descent. His mother died when he was a child, and he was raised by his grandmother in Marseille. He also spent some time with his father in Constantinople and later moved to Paris.

He studied at the École des langues orientales.

== Career ==
Psycharis was director of studies at the École pratique des hautes études after 1885, and then professor at the École des langues orientales from 1903 to 1928, succeeding Émile Legrand.

In 1886, he made a trip to Greece out of which he wrote My Journey, advocacy of Demotic Greek (with some remarks on the Ancient Greek pronunciation), which connected it with the national integration (Megali Idea). So he became the mentor of the Demotic side in the Greek language question. Because of his stance, in favour of Demotiki, he was heavily criticized by both the conservative political and educational establishment in Greece (most notably professor Georgios Hatzidakis), and he was often under attack by various newspapers.

Psycharis was the populariser of the term diglossia,, which describes a language community's simultaneous use of the genuine mother tongue of the present day, the vernacular, and a dialect from centuries earlier in the history of the language. The vernacular is of low prestige and is discouraged or totally forbidden for written use and formal spoken use, while the obsolete dialect is of high prestige and is used for most written communication and for formal speeches by institutions of authority such as government and religious institutions. Diglossia was a major issue in Greek society and politics in the 19th and 20th centuries (see Greek language question).

Psycharis also proposed an innovative orthography for Greek that never really caught on, despite being the focus of several serious attempts at implementation continuing into the late 20th century. A beginning Modern Greek textbook for foreign students, Ellinika Tora (Greek Now), employs some of his suggestions such as substituting rho for lambda when the pronunciation of the glide is conditioned by the other sounds around it – thus αδερφός (aderfos) instead of standard αδελφός (adelphos). While that and other of his suggestions more accurately reflect true pronunciation, they seem to have little chance of being adopted.

During the Dreyfus affair, Psycharis defended Alfred Dreyfus, who had been falsely accused of treason because he was Jewish. Moreover, Psycharis supported his friend Emile Zola's publication of J'accuse…!, a public letter in defense of Dreyfus.

== Personal life ==
In 1882, he married Ernest Renan's daughter, Noémie. They had four children, among which Ernest Psichari, Henriette Revault d'Allonnes and Corrie Siohan, raised in the Scheffer-Renan Hôtel, the current Musée de la Vie romantique in the heart of the Nouvelle Athènes neighbourhood, in Paris.

== Death ==
Psycharis died in Paris on 29 September 1929. He is buried in Chios.

== Works ==
- Psychari, Jean (1888). My Journey [Το ταξίδι μου]. Athens: S. K. Vlastos.

== See also ==
- Musée de la Vie romantique, Hôtel Scheffer-Renan, Paris
