= Demoticist =

Demoticist may refer to:

- A follower of Demoticism, the Greek cultural and political movement
- An expert on the Demotic (Egyptian) script, usually called a demotist
