= Dimitris Glinos =

Greek educator, philosopher and politician

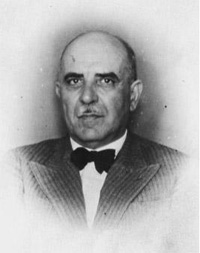
- Glinos in 1940
- Born: September 2, 1882; Smyrna, Aidin Vilayet, Ottoman Empire
- Died: December 26, 1943 (aged 61); Athens, Greece
- Occupation: Teacher
- Spouse: Anna Dim. Chroni
- Parent: Alexandros Glinos

Dimitris Glinos (Greek: Δημήτρης Γληνός; September 2, 1882 – December 26, 1943) was a Greek educator, philosopher and politician.

== Life ==
Glinos was born in Smyrna, the eldest of twelve children of Alexandros Glinos. After graduating from the Smyrna Evangelical School, he went to Athens in 1899 and enrolled in the Philosophy Department of the University of Athens. He graduated in 1905 and proceeded to study philosophy, pedagogy, and experimental psychology in Germany at the University of Jena (under Rudolf Eucken from 1908 to 1909), and at the University of Leipzig (under Wilhelm Wundt from 1909 to 1911). In Germany, he was acquainted with Georgios Skliros who introduced Glinos to socialist ideology and had decisive effect on his later career.

He married Anna Chroni in September 1908.

Upon his return to Greece, he submitted a proposal for an educational reform to the government in 1913. He proposed introduction of, and changes to:

- The language of instruction (using colloquial Demotic Greek instead of the old-fashioned Katharevousa). Glinos proposed even the use of the Latin alphabet, in the place of Greek, for tonic reasons.
- The structure of the school system (extend primary school from 4 to 6 years)
- Educational content (less formalism, greater emphasis on science)
- Educational methods (updating of courses and materials)
- Teacher training
- The education of girls

Glinos eventually became Secretary-General of the Ministry of Education in 1917 under prime minister Eleftherios Venizelos and began to introduce the proposed reforms. His efforts were stopped, and his reforms undone when Venizelos lost power in 1920, and Glinos began publishing under the pseudonym "A. Gabriel, teacher". He re-introduced the reforms after he was reinstated when Venizelos regained power in 1922, but dampened again when Theodore Pangalos took power in 1925.

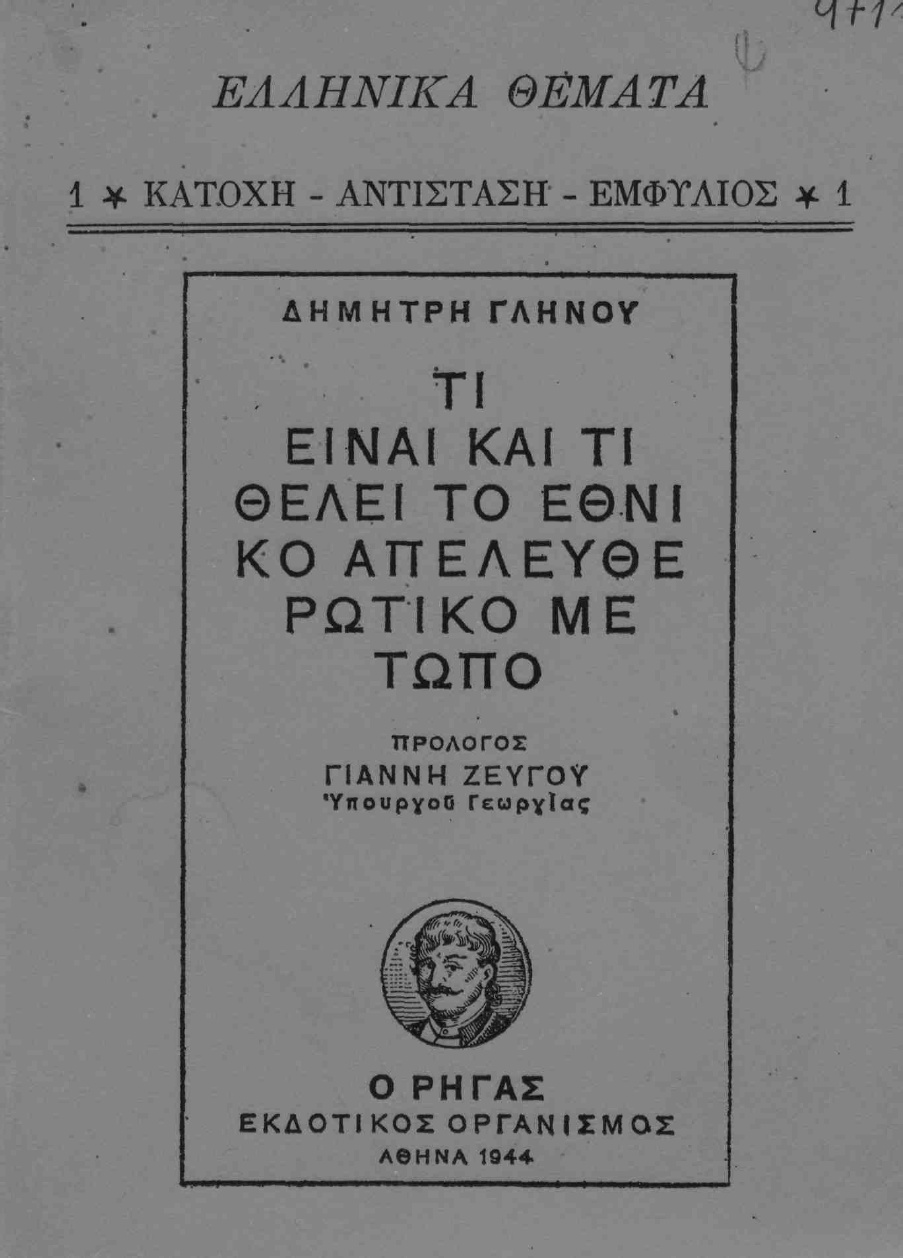
Glinos' booklet "What is the National Liberation Front and what does it want", 1944 re-issue

In 1930 he began his active involvement in politics, being elected as an MP with the Communist Party of Greece in the 1936 elections. After the establishment of the Metaxas Regime, along with many other Communists and other political dissidents, he was sent to internal exile on the island of Agios Efstratios. During the Axis Occupation of Greece, Glinos became actively involved in the founding of the Communist-led National Liberation Front (EAM), and wrote its political manifesto, What is the National Liberation Front, and what does it want (Τί είναι και τί θέλει το ΕΑΜ) in September 1942. At the same time, in December 1942, he was elected a member of the Politburo of the KKE, in whose ranks he had been a member since 1935.

Glinos died during Christmas of 1943, after an operation and while he was preparing to move to Free Greece, in order to participate in the foundation of the "Mountain Government" and possibly take the position of its President.

== Works ==
- Creative Historism. Sideris: Athens, 1920.
- Feminist Humanism. Higher Education Faculty for Women: Athens, 1921.
- Pigs are Oinking, Guinea Pigs are Weeking, Snakes are Hissing. Hestia: Athens, 1921; 2nd edn., Dimitrakos: Athens, 1923.
- Nation and Language. Hestia: Athens, 1922.
- The Crisis of Demoticism. Hestia: Athens, 1923.
- The Goals of the Pedagogical Academy. Athens 1924.
- An Unburied Dead. Athina Publishing House: Athens, 1925.
- Address of the Board of Directors of the Educational Association. Athens, 1927.
- The Open Road Ahead, Student Fraternity: Athens, 1932.
- Address to New Students, Student Fraternity: Athens, 1933.
- The Raisin Question. Rizospastis: Athens, 1936.
- On Humanist Studies in Greece Today. Zacharopoulos: Athens, 1940.
- A Few Thoughts on Plato and his Work. Zacharopoulos: Athens, 1940.
- What is the National Liberation Front (1942). 2nd edn., Rigas: Athens, 1944
- Today's Issues of the Greek People (1944). 2nd edn., Ta Nea Vivlia: Athens, 1945.
- The War Trilogy. Ta Nea Vivlia: Athens, 1945. Repr., edited by George D. Boubous, Papazisis: Athens, 2004.
- The Philosophy of Hegel. Ta Nea Vivlia: Athens, 1946.
- Unpublished essays and correspondence, in the collective volume To the Memory of Dimitris A. Glinos, Ta Nea Vivlia: Athens, 1946. Repr., edited by Costas Mavreas and George D. Boubous, Papazisis: Athens, 2003.
- Selected Works, 4 vols., ed. by Loukas Axelos. Stochastis: Athens, 1971–75.
- Collected Works, vols. 1–2, ed. by Philippos Iliou. Themelio: Athens, 1983.
