= Georgios Skliros =

Greek intellectual and journalist (1878–1919)

- Γεώργιος Κωνσταντινίδης
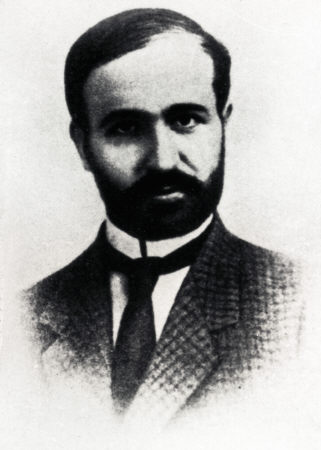
- Georgios Skliros (date unknown)
- Born: Georgios Konstantinides; 1878; Trebizond, Ottoman Empire
- Died: 24 December 1919 (aged 40–41); Alexandria, Sultanate of Egypt
- Other names: Skliros «Σκληρός»

Georgios Konstantinides (Greek: Γεώργιος Κωνσταντινίδης; nom de plume Skliros (Σκληρός); 1878–1919) was an early Greek socialist intellectual and journalist. Describing contemporary reality, he based his work on the class stratification of society and, analyzing Greek society, using Marxist methods. Until his death he was considered to be “the most significant Greek Marxist”.

== Biography ==
Skleros was born to a middle-class family of Trebizond in Ottoman Pontus, and took a typical education and cosmopolitan outlook for the city and its Greek quarter of that age, and in his younger years travelled to Odessa in Russia to work as a merchant. Later he left for Moscow, where he engaged in medical studies, in 1904, at the University of Moscow. The following year he got involved in the revolutionary movement, under the influence of Georgi Plekhanov, taking up the pseudonym of "Skliros" ("Severe"). A series of problems with the Tsarist establishment drove him to Estonia and then to Jena in Germany. There, as representative of Marxist theory he met with Dimitris Glinos in the "Filiki Prodevtiki Enosi" ("Friendly Progressive Unity"), a student society oriented in a socialist direction.

Skleros, suffering from tuberculosis, then moved to and lived in Alexandria, where he died in 1919.

== Works ==
- Το Κοινωνικόν μας Ζήτημα (Our Common Goal, 1907)
- Η Φιλοσοφία του Πολέμου και της Ειρήνης (The Philosophy of War and of Peace)
- Σύγχρονα Προβλήματα του Ελληνισμού (Contemporary Problems in Hellenism)
- Μελέτες - παρεμβάσεις στα πολιτικά και πολιτιστικά δρώμενα (Plans - Interventions in Politics and Political Roles)
