= Demotic Greek =

Vernacular form of Modern Greek

Demotic Greek (Greek: Δημοτική Γλώσσα, Dimotikí Glóssa [ðimotiˈci ˈɣlo.sa], lit. 'language of the people') is the standard spoken language of Greece in modern times and, since the resolution of the Greek language question in 1976, the official language of Greece. "Demotic Greek" (with a capital D) contrasts with the conservative Katharevousa, which was used in formal settings, during the same period. In that context, Demotic Greek describes the specific non-standardized vernacular forms of Greek used by the vast majority of Greeks during the 19th and 20th centuries.

As is typical of diglossic situations, Katharevousa and Demotic complemented and influenced each other. Over time, Demotic became standardized. In 1976, it was made the official language of Greece. It continued to evolve and is now called Standard Modern Greek. The term "demotic Greek" (with a minuscule d) also refers to any variety of the Greek language which has evolved naturally from Ancient Greek and is popularly spoken.

== Basic features ==
Demotic Greek differs in a few ways from Ancient Greek and from subsequent learned forms of Greek. Syntactically, it favours parataxis over subordination. It also heavily employs redundancy, such as μικρό κοριτσάκι (small little-girl) and ξανακοιμήθηκε πάλι (he-went-back-to-sleep again). Demotic also employs the diminutive with great frequency, to the point that many Demotic forms are in effect neuter diminutives of ancient words, especially irregular ones, e.g. νησί from νήσιον (island) from ancient νῆσος (island).

Greek noun declensions underwent considerable alteration, with irregular and less productive forms being gradually regularized (e.g. ancient ἀνήρ being replaced by άντρας (man)). Another feature is the merging of classical accusative and nominative forms in 1st and 3rd declension: They are only distinguished in Demotic by their definite articles, which continued to be declined as in Ancient Greek. This was especially common with nouns of the third declension, such as πατρίς (hometown, fatherland) which became nominative η πατρίδα, accusative την πατρίδα in Demotic.

A result of this regularization of noun forms in Demotic is that most native words end in a vowel, s (ς), or n (ν). Thus, the set of possible word-final sounds is even more restricted than in Ancient Greek. Exceptions are foreign loans like μπαρ (bar), learned forms ύδωρ (from Ancient Greek ὕδωρ, water), and exclamations like αχ! (ach!, oh!). Many dialects even append the vowel -e (ε) to third-person verb forms: γράφουνε instead of γράφουν (they write). Word-final consonant clusters are also rare, again mainly occurring in learned discourse and via foreign loans: άνθραξ (coal – scientific) and μποξ (boxing – sport).

The indirect object is usually expressed by prepending the word σε to the accusative (where Ancient Greek had εἰς for accusative of motion toward) or genitive (especially with regard to means or instrument). Bare σε is used without the article to express an indefinite duration of time, or contracted with the definite article for definiteness (especially with regard to place where or motion toward). Using one noun with an unmarked accusative article-noun phrase followed by σε contracted with the definite article of a second noun distinguishes between definite direct and indirect objects, whether real or figurative, e.g. «βάζω το χέρι μου στο ευαγγέλιο» or «...στη φωτιά» (lit. I put my hand upon the Gospel or ...in the fire, i.e. I swear it's true, I'm sure of it). By contrast, Katharevousa continued to employ the older εἰς in place of σε.

The verb system inherited from Ancient Greek gradually evolved. The perfect, pluperfect, future perfect, and past conditional tenses were gradually replaced with conjugated forms of the verb έχω (I have). The future tense and the subjunctive and optative moods, and eventually the infinitive, were replaced by the modal/tense auxiliaries θα and να used with either the simplified or fused future/subjunctive forms. In contrast to this, Katharevousa employed older perfective forms and infinitives that had been mostly lost in the spoken language. However, Katharevousa did sometimes employ the same aorist or perfective forms as the spoken language, but preferred an archaizing form of the present indicative, e.g. κρύπτω for Demotic κρύβω (I hide), which both have the same aorist form έκρυψα.

Demotic Greek also borrowed a significant number of words from other languages, including Italian and Turkish, something which Katharevousa avoided.

== Demotic and Modern Greek ==
=== Demotic as "Standard Modern Greek" ===
Demotic is commonly used interchangeably with "Standard Modern Greek" (Νέα Ελληνικά). Nonetheless, these terms are not necessarily synonyms. While today's Standard Modern Greek is fundamentally a continuation of earlier Demotic, it also contains—especially in its written form and formal registers—numerous words, grammatical forms, and phonetical features that did not exist in the most "pure" and consistent forms of Demotic during the period of diglossia in Greece. Due to these admixtures, it could even be described as a product of a "merger" between earlier Demotic and Katharevousa.

Furthermore, in a broader sense, the Greek term Δημοτική (Dimotikí) can also describe any naturally evolved colloquial language of the Greeks, not just that of the period of diglossia.

=== Modern features that did not exist in Demotic ===
The following examples are intended to demonstrate Katharevousa features in Modern Greek. They were not present in traditional Demotic and only entered the modern language through Katharevousa (sometimes as neologisms), where they are used mostly in writing (for instance, in newspapers), but also orally, especially words and fixed expressions are both understood and actively used also by non-educated speakers. In some cases, the Demotic form is used for literal or practical meanings, while the Katharevousa is used for figurative or specialized meanings: e.g. φτερό for the wing or feather of a bird, but πτέρυξ for the wing of a building or airplane or arm of an organisation.

==== Words and fixed expressions ====
- ενδιαφέρων (interesting)
- τουλάχιστον (at least)
- την απήγαγε (he abducted her)
- είναι γεγονός ότι ... (it is a fact that ...)
- προς το παρόν (for now)
- νίπτω τας χείρας μου (figurative, I wash my hands [of him, her, it]); adapted from the Ancient Greek phrase describing Pontius Pilate washing his hands at Matthew 27:24; for actual hand-washing, the Demotic phrase is πλένω τα χέρια μου.

Special dative forms:

- δόξα τω Θεώ (thank God)
- εν ονόματι ... (in the name [of] ...)
- τοις μετρητοίς (in cash)
- εν συνεχεία (following)
- εν τω μεταξύ (meanwhile)
- εν αγνοία (in ignorance [of])
- συν τοις άλλοις (moreover)
- επί τω έργω (working, literally on the deed)
- τοις εκατό (percent, literally in a hundred)
- ιδίοις χερσί (with [one's] own hands)

==== Grammatical (morphological) features ====
- Adjectives ending in -ων, -ουσα, -ον (e.g. ενδιαφέρων interesting) or in -ων, -ων, -ον (e.g. σώφρων thoughtful) - mostly in written language.
- Declinable aorist participle, e.g. παραδώσας (having delivered), γεννηθείς ([having been] born) - mostly in written language.
- Reduplication in the perfect. E.g. προσκεκλημένος (invited), πεπαλαιωμένος (obsolete)

==== Phonological features ====
Modern Greek features many letter combinations that were avoided in traditional Demotic:

- -πτ- (e.g. πταίσμα "misdemeanor"); Demotic preferred -φτ- (e.g. φταίω "to err; to be guilty")
- -κτ- (e.g. κτίσμα "building, structure"); Demotic preferred -χτ- [e.g. χτίστης "(stone)mason"]
- -ευδ- (e.g. ψεύδος "falsity, lie"); Demotic preferred -ευτ- (e.g. ψεύτης "liar")
- -σθ- (e.g. ηρκέσθην / αρκέσθηκα "I was sufficed / satisfied"); Demotic preferred -στ- (e.g. αρκέστηκα)
- -χθ- (e.g. (ε)χθές "yesterday"); Demotic preferred -χτ- [e.g. (ε)χτές]
- etc.

Native Greek speakers, depending upon their level of education, may often make mistakes in these "educated" aspects of their language; one can often see mistakes like προήχθη instead of προήχθην (I've been promoted), λόγου του ότι/λόγο το ότι instead of λόγω του ότι (due to the fact that), τον ενδιαφέρον άνθρωπο instead of τον ενδιαφέροντα άνθρωπο (the interesting person), οι ενδιαφέροντες γυναίκες instead of οι ενδιαφέρουσες γυναίκες (the interesting women), ο ψήφος instead of η ψήφος (the vote).

== Radical demoticism ==
One of the most radical proponents of a language that was to be cleansed of all "educated" elements was Giannis Psycharis, who lived in France and gained fame through his work My Voyage (Το ταξίδι μου, 1888). Not only did Psycharis propagate the exclusive use of the naturally grown colloquial language, but he actually opted for simplifying the morphology of Katharevousa forms prescription.

For instance, Psycharis proposed changing the form of the neuter noun "light" το φως (gen. του φωτός) into το φώτο (gen. του φώτου). Such radical forms had occasional precedent in Renaissance attempts to write in Demotic, and reflected Psycharis' linguistic training as a Neogrammarian, mistrusting the possibility of exceptions in linguistic evolution. Moreover, Psycharis also advocated spelling reform, which would have meant abolishing most of the six different ways to write the vowel /i/ and all instances of double consonants. Therefore, he wrote his own name as Γιάνης, instead of Γιάννης.

As written and spoken Demotic became standardized over the next few decades, many compromises were made with Katharevousa (as is reflected in contemporary standard Greek) despite the loud objections of Psycharis and the radical "psycharist" (ψυχαρικοί) camp within the proponents of Demotic's use. Eventually these ideas of radical demoticism were largely marginalized and when a standardized Demotic was made the official language of the Greek state in 1976, the legislation stated that it would be used "without dialectal and extremist forms"—an explicit rejection of Psycharis' ideals.
