= Katharevousa =

Former prestige form of the Modern Greek language

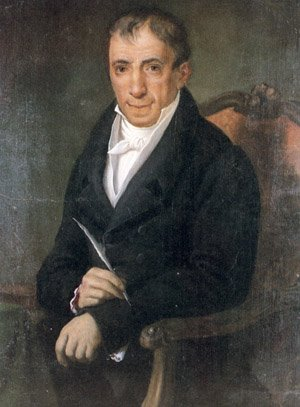
Adamantios Korais, the conceiver of Katharevousa

Katharevousa (Greek: Καθαρεύουσα [kaθaˈrevusa], literally 'purifying [language]') is a conservative form of the Modern Greek language conceived in the late 18th century as both a literary language and a compromise between Ancient Greek and the contemporary vernacular, Demotic Greek. Originally, it was widely used for both literary and official purposes, though sparingly in daily language. In the 20th century, it was increasingly adopted for official and formal purposes, until minister of education Georgios Rallis made Demotic Greek the official language of Greece in 1976, and in 1982 Prime Minister Andreas Papandreou abolished the polytonic system of writing for both Demotic and Katharevousa.

Katharevousa was conceived by the intellectual and revolutionary leader Adamantios Korais (1748–1833). A graduate of the University of Montpellier, Korais spent most of his life as an expatriate in Paris. As a classical scholar credited with both laying the foundations of Modern Greek literature and being a major figure in the Greek Enlightenment, he was repelled by Byzantine influence on Greek society as well as that of its successors, and was a fierce critic of the clergy and their alleged subservience to the Ottoman Empire. He held that education was a prerequisite to Greek liberation.

Part of Katharevousa's purpose was to serve as a compromise solution for the struggle between the "archaists" demanding full reversion to archaic Greek, and the "modernists".

== History ==
Although Katharevousa was introduced relatively recently, the concept of a conservative literary version of Greek had been present since the times of Koine Greek. There had always existed a tendency towards a state of diglossia between the Attic literary language and the constantly developing spoken Koine, which eventually evolved into Demotic Greek. Medieval Greek texts and documents of the Byzantine Empire were almost always written in conservative literary Greek. Examples of texts written in vernacular Greek prior to the 13th century are very rare. It can be argued that the establishment of Katharevousa was an official declaration and standardization of the conservative form of Greek, which had already existed in one way or another. The first known use of the term Katharevousa is in a work by the Greek polymath Nikephoros Theotokis, in 1796.

Old no-parking sign seen in Anemotia, Lesvos. The word στάθμευσις ("parking") is Katharevousa Greek.

Katharevousa was widely used in public documents and whatever was conceived as work of formal activity by Greek scholars. The name Katharevousa implies a pure form of Greek as it might hypothetically have evolved from ancient Greek without external influences, while in its modern connotation the word has come to mean "formal language". In later years, Katharevousa was used for official and formal purposes (such as politics, letters, official documents, and newscasting), while Demotic Greek (δημοτική, dimotikí), or popular Greek, was the daily language. This created a diglossic situation whereby most of the Greek population was excluded from the public sphere and advancement in education unless they conformed to Katharevousa.

In 1976, Demotic was made the official language, and in 1982 Andreas Papandreou abolished the polytonic system of writing; by the end of the 20th century full Katharevousa in its earlier form had become obsolete. Much of the vocabulary of Katharevousa and its grammatical and syntactical rules have influenced the Demotic language, so that the project's emphasis has made an observable contribution to the language as it is used today. Modern Greek might be argued to be a combination of the original Demotic and the traditional Katharevousa as stressed in the 19th century, also with institutional input from Koine Greek. Among Katharevousa's later contributions are the promotion of classically based compounds to describe items and concepts that did not exist in earlier times, such as "newspaper" (εφημερίδα, ephimerída), "police" (αστυνομία, astymomía), "automobile" (αυτοκίνητο, aftokínito) and "television" (τηλεόραση, tileórasi) rather than borrowing new words directly from other languages.

== Etymology ==
Katharevousa (Greek: Καθαρεύουσα) means 'cleansing, purifying', the feminine present participle of the verb katharévo (Greek: καθαρεύω, pronounced [kaθaˈrevo]). (The term is thus cognate with English catharsis.)

== Present-day use ==
The Church of Greece and other churches of the Greek Orthodox tradition still use Katharevousa in official communications.

== Text sample ==
This is a text sample of Katharevousa from the Great Greek Encyclopedia, published in 1930. The text relates to Adamantios Korais's relations with the Greek Church. It is rendered in Demotic and translated into English.

Katharevousa	Standard Modern Greek
Ἡ δ' ἀπὸ τῆς Ἑλλάδος ἀποδημία του ἐγένετο πρόξενος πολλῶν ἀδίκων κρίσεων περὶ προσώπων καὶ πραγμάτων καὶ πρῶτα πρῶτα τῆς περὶ ἧς ἀνωτέρω ἔγινε λόγος πρὸς τὸν κλῆρον συμπεριφορᾶς του. Ἂν ἔζη ἐν Ἑλλάδι καὶ ἤρχετο εἰς ἐπικοινωνίαν πρὸς τὸν κλῆρον καὶ ἐγνώριζεν ἐκ τοῦ πλησίον ὄχι μόνον τὰς κακίας, ἀλλὰ καὶ τὰς ἀρετὰς αὐτοῦ, ὄχι μόνον πολὺ θὰ συνετέλει εἰς διόρθωσίν τινων ἐκ τῶν κακῶς ἐν τῇ Ἐκκλησίᾳ ἐχόντων, ἀλλὰ καὶ δὲν θὰ ἤκουεν ὅσα ἤκουσεν ἐκ τῶν ὑπερβολικῶν κατὰ τοῦ κλήρου ἐκφράσεών του.	Η αποδημία του από την Ελλάδα έγινε πρόξενος πολλών άδικων κρίσεων για πρόσωπα και πράγματα και πρώτα πρώτα, για την οποία έγινε λόγος παραπάνω, της συμπεριφοράς του προς τον κλήρο. Αν ζούσε στην Ελλάδα και ερχόταν σε επικοινωνία με τον κλήρο και γνώριζε από κοντά όχι μόνο τις κακίες, αλλά και τις αρετές αυτού, όχι μόνο θα συντελούσε πολύ στη διόρθωση μερικών από τα κακά που υπάρχουν στην Εκκλησία, αλλά και δεν θα άκουγε όσα άκουσε εξαιτίας των υπερβολικών εκφράσεών του εναντίον του κλήρου.
Transliteration: Hē d' apò tē̂s Helládos apodēmía tou egéneto próxenos pollō̂n adíkōn kríseōn perì prosṓpōn kaì pragmátōn kaì prō̂ta prō̂ta tē̂s perì hē̂s anōtérō égine lógos pròs tòn klē̂ron symperiphorâs tou. Àn ézē en Helládi kaì ḗrcheto eis epikoinōnían pròs tòn klē̂ron kaì egnṓrizen ek toû plēsíon óchi mónon tàs kakías, allà kaì tàs aretàs autoû, óchi mónon polỳ thà synetélei eis diórthōsín tinōn ek tō̂n kakō̂s en tē̂i Ekklēsíāi echóntōn, allà kaì dèn thà ḗkouen hósa ḗkousen ek tō̂n hyperbolikō̂n katà toû klḗrou ekphráseṓn tou.	Transliteration: I apodimía tou apó tín Elláda égine próxenos pollón ádikon kríseon gia prósopa kai prágmata kai próta próta, gia tín opía égine lógos parapáno, tís siberiphorás tou pros ton klíro. An zoúse stin Elláda kai erchótan se epikinonía me ton klíro kai gnórize apó kondá óchi móno tis kakíes, allá kai tis aretés aftoú, óchi móno tha syndeloúse polý sti diórthosi merikón apó ta kaká pou ypárchoun stin Ekklisía, allá kai den tha ákouge ósa ákouse exetías tōn ypervolikón ekphráseón tou enandíon tou klírou.

- English translation: His expatriation from Greece was a cause for many unjust judgments as regards situations and people, and mainly for his behaviour towards the clergy, which was discussed above. If he had lived in Greece and been in contact with the clergy and known closely not only its turpitude but also its virtues, not only would he have contributed greatly to correcting some of the problems within the Church, but also would not have listened to all that he listened to due to his exaggerated sentiments against the clergy.

== See also ==
- Demotic Greek
- Diglossia
- Greek diacritics
- Greek language question
- Linguistic purism

Similar movements

- Landsmål, Nynorsk, Riksmål (Norwegian)
- Modern Standard Arabic
- Revival of the Hebrew language
- Language reform and modern Turkish
