= Georgios Hatzidakis =

Greek philologist (1843-1941)

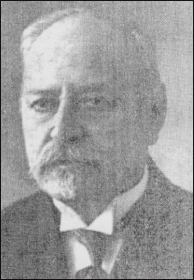
Georgios Hatzidakis (1915)

Georgios Nicolaou Hatzidakis, a.k.a. Georgios Nikolaou Chatzidakis (Greek: Γεώργιος Νικολάου Χατζιδάκις; 23 November [O.S. 11 November] 1843, in Myrthios, Ottoman Crete – 28 June 1941, in Athens) was a Greek philologist, who is regarded as the father of linguistics in Greece. He was the first chair of Linguistics and Indian Philology at the University of Athens in 1890–1923.

== Life and work ==
His family was traditionally part of the Cretan revolts against the Ottoman Empire. His grandfather Kyriakos had taken part as a captain in the uprising of 1821. After his schooling at Rethymno, Georgios at the age of 18 fought himself by the side of his father in the uprising of 1866. After a three-year school visit in Athens, Chatzidakis was enrolled at the faculty of philosophy of the University of Athens for classical philology. In 1877, he won in a university competition a scholarship for linguistics study in Germany, which he pursued afterwards at the University of Leipzig with Georg Curtius and Karl Brugmann. Since then, Chatzidakis remained in contact with German researchers, as for example the more than 15 years his junior Albert Thumb (de) whose obituary he later wrote. After his return to Greece, Chatzidakis was first a grammar school teacher in Athens and was conferred a doctorate the next year with a thesis entitled Συμβολή εις την Ιστορίαν της Ελληνικής Γλώσσης ("Contribution to the History of the Greek Language") at the university there.

== Sources ==
- CV at UoA.gr
