= Oikos (disambiguation) =

Oikos is ancient Greek for "household". It may also refer to:

- Oikos (journal), a journal on ecology
- Oikos International, a sustainability-oriented student association
- Oikos, Cyprus, a village in Cyprus
- Oikos University, a Christian school in Oakland, California
- Oikos (Swedish think-tank), a conservative Swedish think-tank, founded 2020
- Oikos, an alternate name for Kontakion, a Byzantine hymn
- Ōiko, a Japanese legendary strong woman in the Heian period
- Oikos/Oykos, a North American brand of Danone yogurt

== See also ==
- Oecus
- Oeconomus
- Oikophobia
- Ecology
