= Ionian school (literature) =

The term Heptanese school of literature (Greek: Επτανησιακή Σχολή, lit. 'school of the Seven Islands'; also known as the Ionian school) denotes the literary production of the Ionian Islands' literature figures from the late 18th century till the end of the 19th century. The center of this production is considered to be the poet Dionysios Solomos, so its periods are conventionally divided as follows: Pre-Solomian poets (Προσολωμικοί ποιητές), Solomian poets, Post-Solomian poets, minors and descendants.

== General traits ==
Some general traits of the Ionian style were:

- the use of Dimotiki instead of Katharevousa (with some exceptions, mainly Kalvos),
- the manifest influence that the contemporary Italian poets had in its thematology, that is regarding the depiction of real-life scenes,
- the worship of homeland,
- the worship of nature,
- a "romantic impulse" (also described as folkloric idealism),
- an emphasis on the importance of love and freedom,
- an appreciation of religion's role in man's life.

== Notable representatives ==
- Mikelis Avlichos
- Andreas Kalvos
- Andreas Laskaratos
- Antonios Martelaos
- Gerasimos Markoras
- Antonios Matesis
- Lorentzos Mavilis
- Iakovos Polylas
- Dionysios Solomos
- Georgios Tertsetis
- Aristotelis Valaoritis
- Ioannis Zambelios

== Notable works ==
- Hymn to Liberty (1823) by Dionysios Solomos (national anthem of Greece)
- The Free Besieged by Solomos
- Vasilikos (1859), play by Antonios Matesis
- The mysteries of Cephalonia (1872) by Andreas Laskaratos
- Idou o anthropos (1886) by Andreas Laskaratos

== Gallery ==
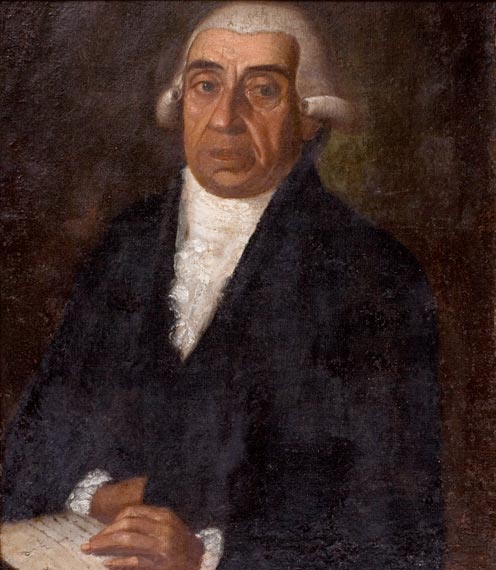
Antonios Matesis

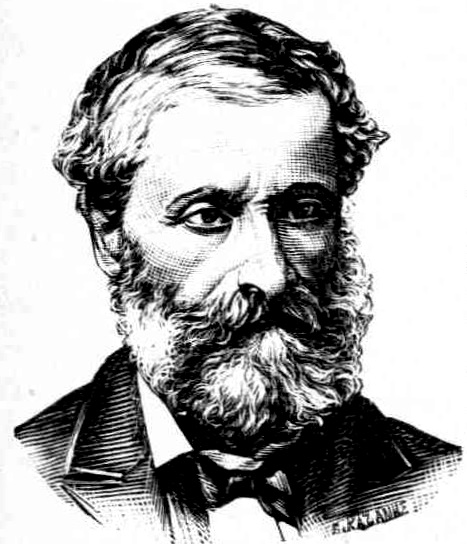
Andreas Laskaratos

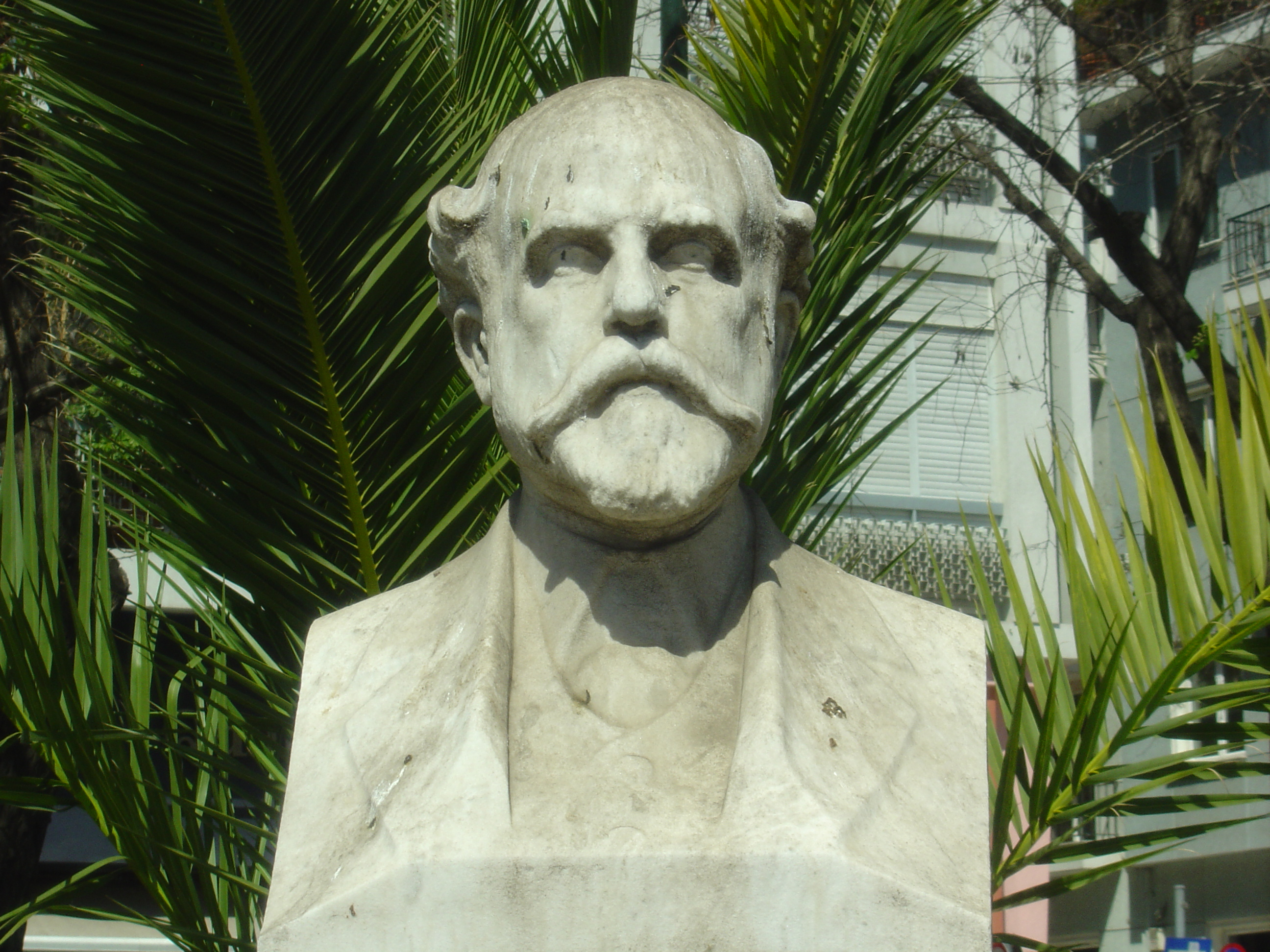
Bust of Lorentzos Mavilis in Athens

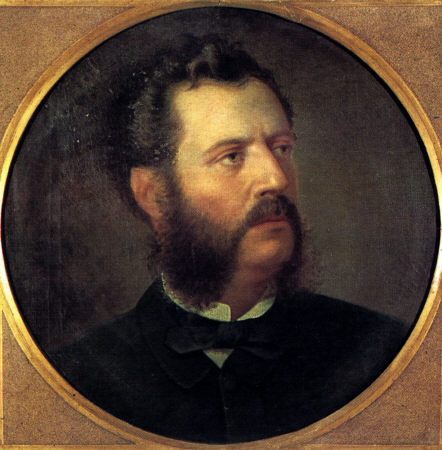
Aristotelis Valaoritis
