= Dionysios Solomos =

Greek national poet (1798–1857)

- Διονύσιος Σολωμός
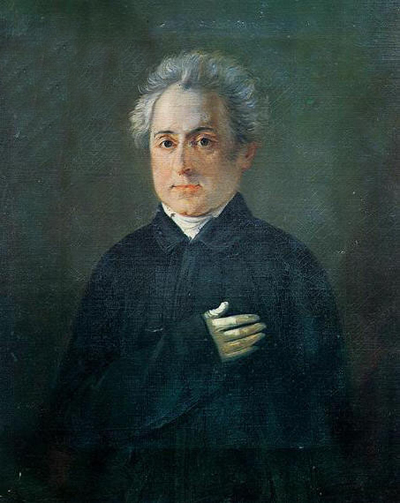
- Born: 8 April 1798; Zakynthos, Département de la Mer-Égée (modern-day Greece)
- Died: 9 February 1857 (aged 58); Kerkyra, United States of the Ionian Islands (modern-day Greece)
- Education: University of Pavia (LL.B., 1817)
- Occupation: Poet
- Writing career
- Language: Greek, Italian
- Notable awards: Gold Cross of the Redeemer; 1849

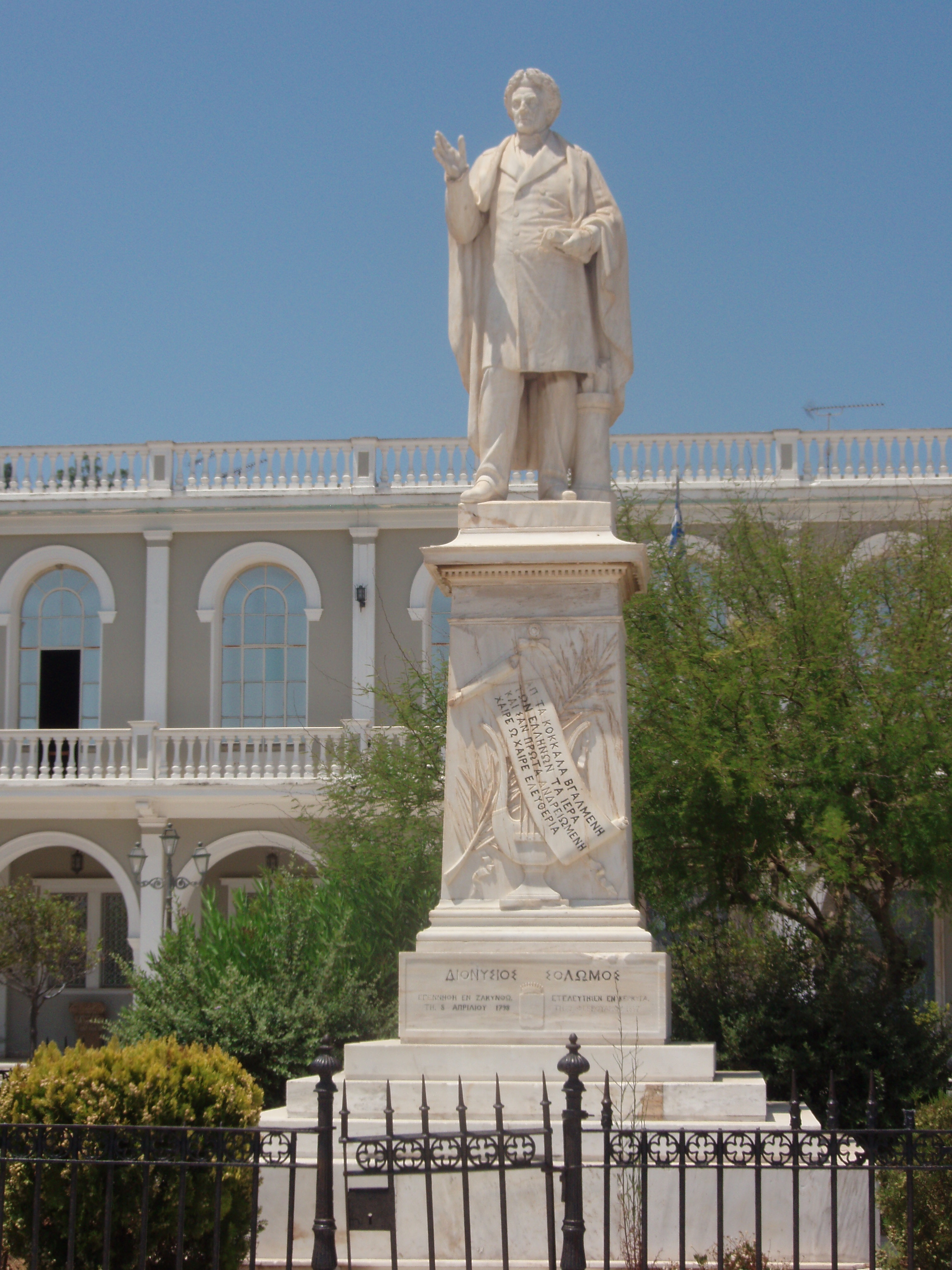
Dionysios Solomos statue in Zakynthos (city)

Dionysios Solomos (/ˈsɒləmɒs/; Greek: Διονύσιος Σολωμός [ði.oˈnisios soloˈmos]; 8 April 1798 – 9 February 1857) was a Greek poet from Zakynthos, who is considered to be Greece's national poet. He is best known for writing the Hymn to Liberty (Greek: Ὕμνος εἰς τὴν Ἐλευθερίαν, Ýmnos eis tīn Eleutherían), which was set to music by Nikolaos Mantzaros and became the Greek and Cypriot national anthem in 1865 and 1966 respectively. He was the central figure of the Heptanese School of poetry. He is considered the national poet of Greece, not only because he wrote the national anthem, but also because he contributed to the preservation of earlier poetic tradition and highlighted its usefulness to modern literature. Other notable poems include Ὁ Κρητικός (The Cretan), Ἐλεύθεροι Πολιορκημένοι (The Free Besieged). A characteristic of his work is that no poem except the Hymn to Liberty was completed, and almost nothing was published during his lifetime.

== Life ==
=== Early life and education ===
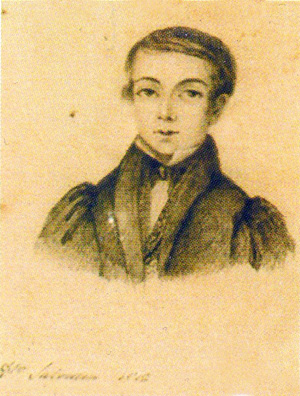
Solomos when young

Born in Zakynthos in 1798, Dionysios Solomos was the illegitimate child of a wealthy count, Nikolaos Solomos, and his housekeeper, Angeliki Nikli. Nikolaos Solomos was of Cretan origin; his family were Cretan refugees who settled on Zakynthos in 1670 after Crete's conquest by the Ottoman Empire in 1669, and was connected with the Venetian patrician family of Salamon, who had settled on the island of Crete in the 15th century. It is possible that his mother Angeliki Nikli came from the region of Mani. The Italian version of the family name is recorded as: Salamon, Salomon, Solomon, and Salomone.

Count Nikolaos Solomos was legally married to Marnetta Kakni, who died in 1802. From that marriage, he had two children: Roberto and Elena. Since 1796, Nikolaos Solomos had a parallel relationship with his housekeeper Angeliki Nikli, who gave birth to one more son apart from Dionysios, Dimitrios (born in 1801). His brother Dimitrios Solomos was in 1852 elected President of the United States of the Ionian Islands under the British Regime and was awarded the British Grand Cross of the Order of St Michael and St George. Count Dimitrios Solomos GCMG was married to Elena, daughter of Dr Demetrio Arvanitachi, the Senator of Zakynthos, who inspired his later work The Woman from Zakynthos.

His father married Dionysios' mother a day before he died on 27 February 1807, making the young Dionysios legitimate and a co-heir to the count's estate, along with his half-brother. The poet spent his childhood years on Zakynthos until 1808, under the supervision of his Italian tutor, abbot Santo Rossi. After his father's death, count Dionysios Messalas gained Solomos' custody, whereas his mother married Manolis Leontarakis on 15 August 1807. In 1808, Messalas sent Solomos to Italy in order to study law, as was customary with Ionian nobility, but possibly also because of Dionysios' mother's new marriage.

=== Studies in Italy ===
Solomos went to Italy with his tutor, who returned to his home town, Cremona. Initially he was enrolled at the Lyceum of St. Catherine in Venice, but he had adjustment difficulties because of the school's strict discipline. For that reason, Rossi took Solomos with him to Cremona, where he finished his high-school studies in 1815. In November 1815, Solomos was enrolled at Pavia University's Faculty of Law, from which he graduated in 1817. Given the interest the young poet showed in the flourishing Italian literature and being a perfect speaker of Italian, he started writing poems in Italian. One of the most important first poems written in Italian during that period of time was the Ode per la prima messa (Ode to the first mass) and La distruzione di Gerusalemme (The destruction of Jerusalem). In the meantime, he acquainted himself with famous Italian poets and novelists (possibly Manzoni, Vincenzo Monti etc.); Ugo Foscolo from Zakynthos was among his friends. As a result, he was easily accepted in the Italian literary circles and evolved into a revered poet of the Italian language.

=== Return to Zakynthos ===
After 10 years of studies Solomos returned to Zakynthos in 1818 with a solid background in literature. On Zakynthos, which at that time was well known for its flourishing literary culture, the poet acquainted himself with people interested in literature. Antonios Matesis (the author of Vasilikos), Georgios Tertsetis, Dionysios Tagiapieras (a physician and supporter of the dimotiki, and also a friend of Ioannis Vilaras) and Nikolaos Lountzis were some of Solomos' most well-known friends. They used to gather in each other's homes and amused themselves by making up poems. They frequently satirized a Zakynthian doctor, Roidis (Solomos' satirical poems referring to the doctor are The doctors' council, the New Year's Day and The Gallows). They also liked to improvise poems on a given rhyme and topic. His improvised Italian poems during that period of time were published in 1822, under the title Rime Improvvisate.

=== First works in Greek and encounter with Spyridon Trikoupis ===
Along with the Italian poems, Solomos made his first attempts to write in Greek. This was a difficult task for the young poet, since his education was classical and in Italian, but also because there did not exist any poetic works written in the demotic dialect that could have served as models. However, the fact that his education in Greek was minimal kept him free of any scholarly influences, that might have led him to write in katharevousa, a "purist" language formulated as a simpler form of ancient Greek. Instead he wrote in the language of the common people of his native island. In order to ameliorate his language skills, he started studying methodically demotic songs, the works of pre-solomian poets (προσολωμικοί ποιητές) and popular and Cretan literature that at that time constituted the best samples of the use of the demotic dialect in modern Greek literature.The result was the first extensive body of literature written in the demotic dialect, a move whose influence on subsequent writers cannot be overstated. Poems dating to that period of time are I Xanthoula — The little blond girl, I Agnoristi — The Unrecognizable, Ta dyo aderfia — The two brothers and I trelli mana — The mad mother.

Solomos' encounter with Spyridon Trikoupis in 1822 was a turning-point in his writing. When Trikoupis visited Zakynthos in 1822, invited by Lord Guilford, Solomos' fame on the island was already widespread and Trikoupis wished to meet him. During their second meeting, Solomos read to him the Ode to the first mass. Impressed by Solomos' poetic skills, Trikoupis stated:

Your poetic aptitude reserves for you a select place on the Italian Parnassus. But the first places there are already taken. The Greek Parnassus does not yet have its Dante.

Solomos explained to Trikoupis that his Greek was not fluent, and Trikoupis helped him in his studies of Christopoulos' poems.

=== Hymn to Liberty and the poet's establishment ===
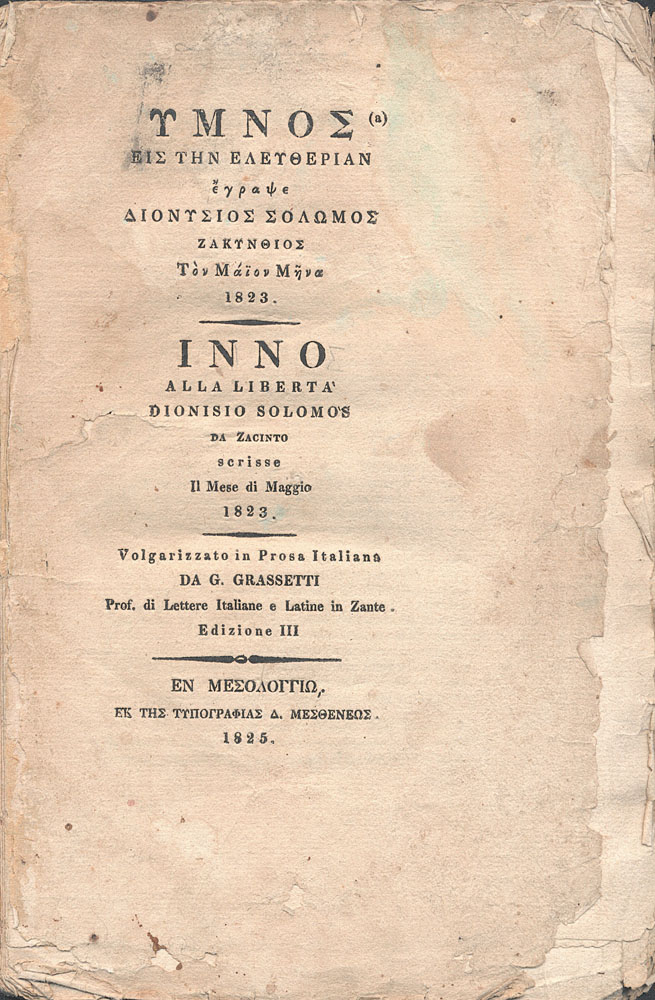
Cover of the "Hymn to Liberty" (Ύμνος εις την ελευθερίαν), published on 1825 (second Greek edition)

The first important turning point in the Greek works of Solomos was the Hymn to Liberty that was completed in May 1823-a poem inspired by the Greek revolution 1821. The poem was at first published in 1824 in occupied Mesolongi and afterwards in Paris in 1825 translated into French and later on in other languages too. This resulted in the poet's fame proliferation outside the Greek borders. Thanks to this poem, Solomos was revered until his death, since the rest of his work was only known to his small circle of admirers and his "students". The Hymn to Liberty inaugurated a new phase in the poet's literary work: this is the time when the poet has finally managed to master the language and is experimenting himself with more complex forms, opening up to new kinds of inspirations and easily leaving aside improvisation. This period resulted in the Odi eis to thanato tou Lordou Byron — Ode to the death of Lord Byron, a poem having many things in common with the Hymn but also many weaknesses, I Katastrofi ton Psaron — Psara's Destruction, O Dialogos — The Dialogue (referring to the language) and I Gynaika tis Zakynthos — The Woman from Zakynthos. It is alleged that Solomos could hear the cannon firing from Zakynthos during the Greek War of Independence, which inspired him to write his most famous works.

=== Establishment on Corfu: first years ===
After frictions and economic disputes with his brother Dimitrios concerning legacy matters, Solomos move to Corfu, the most important intellectual center of the Ionian islands in those years. However, Dionysios did not leave Zakynthos solely because of his family problems; Solomos had been planning to visit the island since 1825. Corfu would offer him not only a more stimulating environment but also the vital isolation for his solitary and bizarre character. Corfu was the perfect place for contemplation and writing poetry, in line with Solomos' noble ideas about Art. That explains the fact that his happiest years were the first years he spent on Corfu. It was during this period of time that he took up studying German romantic philosophy and poetry (Hegel, Schlegel, Schiller, Goethe). Since he did not know German, he read Italian translations by his friend Nikolaos Lountzis. In the meantime, he continued to work on The Woman of Zakynthos and Lambros that he had started in 1826. The Woman of Zakynthos was said to be inspired by the infidelities of his sister-in-law Elena Arvanitachi, the daughter of Dr Demetrio Arvanitachi, the Senator of Zante.

=== 1833: trial and great works of maturity ===
Between 1833 and 1838, having restored the relations with his brother, Solomos' life was perturbed by a series of trials where his half-brother (from his mother's side) Ioannis Leontarakis was claiming part of their father's legacy, arguing that he was also the legal child of count Nikolaos Solomos, since his mother was pregnant before the father's death. Even though the outcome of the trial was favorable to both the poet and his brother, the dispute led to Solomos' alienation from his mother (his feelings were badly hurt because of his adoration towards his mother) and his withdrawal from publicity.

Even though the trial influenced the poet to such a point, it was not able to seize his poetical work. 1833 signifies the mature period of his poetical work, that resulted in the unfinished poems of O Kritikos — The Cretan (1833), Eleftheroi Poliorkimenoi — The Free Besieged (until 1845) and O Porfyras(1847), that are considered to be the best of his works. In the meantime, he was planning other works that either remained at the preparation stage or remained as fragments, such as Nikoforos Vryennios, Eis to thanato Aimilias Rodostamo — To the death of Emilia Rodostamo, To Francisca Fraser and Carmen Seculare.

=== Circle of Corfu ===
On Corfu, Solomos soon found himself at the admirers' and poets' center of attention, a group of well educated intellectuals with liberal and progressive ideas, a deep knowledge of art and with austere artistic pretensions. The most important people Solomos was acquainted to were Nikolaos Mantzaros, Ioannis and Spyridon Zampelios, Ermannos Lountzis, Niccolò Tommaseo, Andreas Mustoxydis, Petros Vrailas Armenis, Iakovos Polylas, Ioulios Typaldos, Andreas Laskaratos and Gerasimos Markoras. Polylas, Typaldos and Markoras were Solomos' students, constituting the circle referred to as the "solomian poets" (σολωμικοί ποιητές), which signifies Greek's poetry flourishing, several decades before the appearance of the New Athenian School, a second poetical renaissance inspired by Kostis Palamas.

=== Last years ===
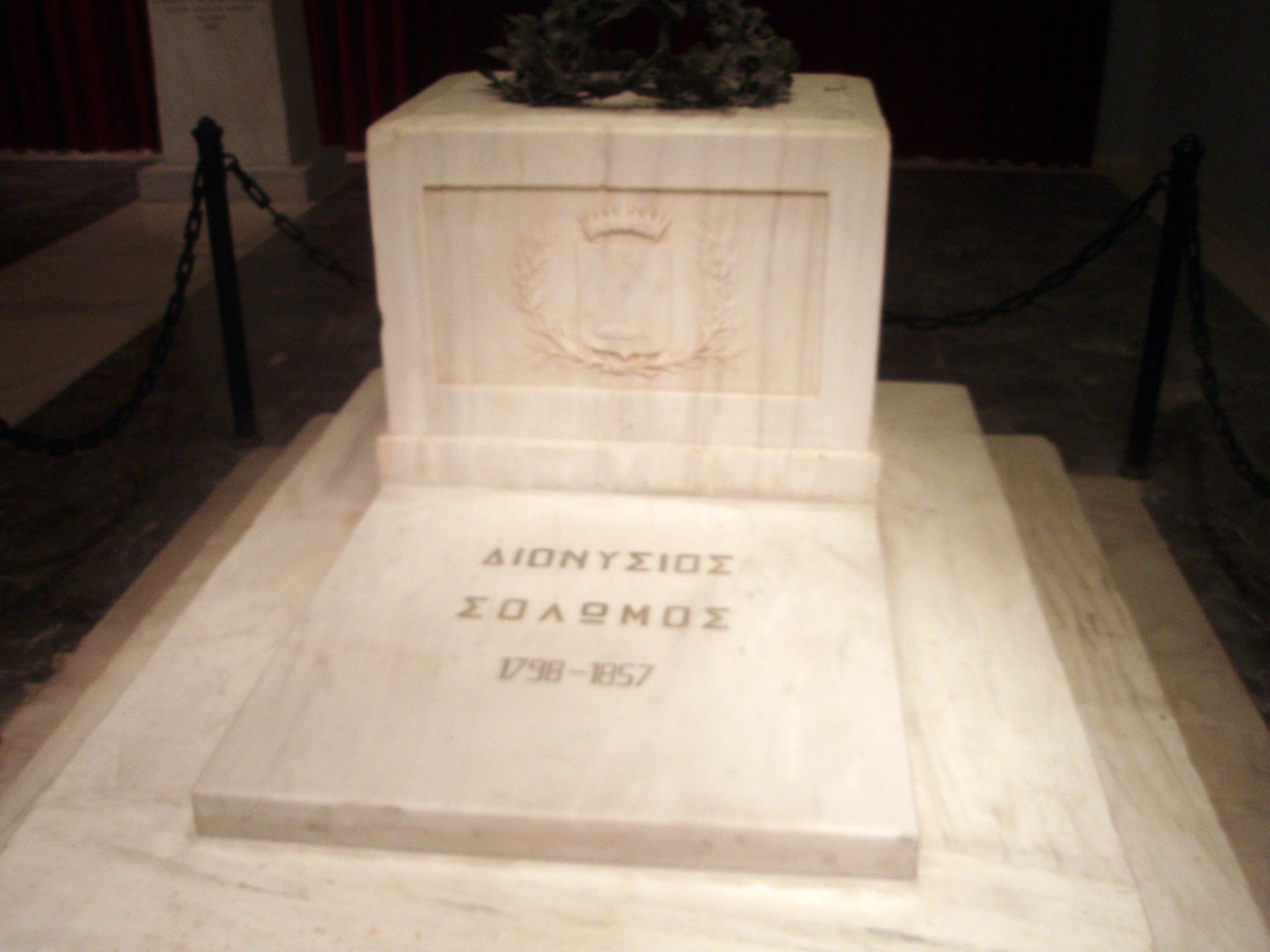
The tomb of Dionysios Solomos, located in the Museum of Dionysios Solomos; Zakynthos (city)

After 1847, Solomos started writing in Italian once more. Most works from this period are half-finished poems and prose drafts that maybe the poet was planning to translate into Greek. Serious health problems made their appearance in 1851 and Solomos' character became even more temperamental. He alienated himself from friends such as Polylas (they came on terms with each other in 1854) and after his third stroke the poet did not leave his house. Solomos died in February 1857 from apoplexy. His fame had reached such heights so when the news about his death became known, everyone mourned. Corfu's theater closed down, the Ionian Parliament's sessions were suspended and mourning was declared. His remains were transferred to Zakynthos in 1865.

== Work ==
=== Literary influences and major works ===
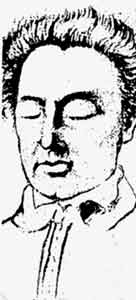
Sketch of Solomos after his death (1857) by Dionysios Vegias

Solomos' first poems written on Zakynthos were influenced by Italian poetry of that era, in line with the Academy of Arcadia movement (e.g. O thanatos tou voskou-The shepherd's death, Evrikomi) and by early romanticism (I trelli mana-The mad mother). Generally speaking, Solomos was heavily influenced by European romanticism, including Byron and Leopardi. The decade 1823–1833 determined the poet's progress. It was during that time he tried to give up improvisation and abandoned the new classicism style of poems such as Hymn to Liberty and Ode to the death of Lord Byron.

Solomos was exposed to the cultural and political ferment of the Enlightenment and the ideas of the French Revolution, and he identified with Italian national sentiments for unification and liberation from the Habsburgs.

In 1823, the poet writes the epic Hymn to Liberty, the first two stanzas of which became the Greek national anthem. This work salutes the War of Greek Independence, started in 1821, by invoking the personified image of Liberty, reborn and renewed out of "the sacred bones of the Greeks." Of particular interest to non-Greeks are references to all the great powers of the time, which include the "heartfelt joy of Washington's land" that "remembered the irons that bound her as well", and a savage dig at the Austrian Eagle "that feeds on the entrails of the Italians to grow wings and talons" and does his best to harm Liberty. Solomos' own Ionian islands, under British rule at the time, are described as being "artfully chained" and having "'False Freedom' written on their foreheads." The poem does not shrink from the savagery of the war, and ends with exhortations to the revolutionaries to maintain unity and avoid civil war, which had already erupted at the time of writing. In the Hymn to Liberty Solomos rejoices in the sight of "lily-fingered virgins" whose "breasts are preparing the sweet-suckled milk of bravery and freedom."

In 1824, Solomos composed The Dialogue, dealing with the language issue. The work involves three people: the poet, his friend (the first draft mentions Sp. Trikoupis) and the savant. However, it is mainly the poet and the savant who speak. The poet is trying to prove that katharevousa is an artificial language, of no use to either the people nor to literature. The poet supports a literary language based on the language spoken by the people, that should be elaborated on by the poet. In order to support his argument, the following phrase is used: "firstly succumb to the language of the people and then, if you are worthy, conquer it". His arguments are based on the French Age of Enlightenment on the subject of the use of national languages and on examples of Italian poetry, by which he tries to prove that no word is vulgar in itself but gets its meaning by the poem's context. At the end of the work, the poet abandons the rational reasoning and supports his arguments with passion.

Between 1824 and 1826, the poet started working on the poem Lampros, a poem that remained unfinished. Lampros is an extreme romantic hero: he entered into a relationship with a young girl named Maria and they had four children without being married. Lampros sen t their children to an orphanage. While he was fighting against Ali Pasha, he met a girl, unaware of the fact that she was his daughter, and had a love affair with her. When he finally became aware of the incest, after recognizing the daughter's birthmarks, he told his daughter the truth that resulted in the daughter's suicide. On his way home, Lampros was forced to tell Maria about his crime and he fled to a church in order to appease his soul. Divine Justice however sent the three boys' ghosts that chased him to the end of a cliff from which he fell of. Maria had already lost her reason and fell into a lake, hoping that she would at last find peace.

Between 1826 and 1829, Solomos worked on the prose-like poem I Gynaika tis Zakynthos, a work of a satirical character, that mainly analyses the Evil. The poem is a monk's (Dionysios) narration and "I Gynaika"-"The Woman" is the Evil's main expression. It is said that this composition was about one of Solomos' relatives and that is the reason why the poet's brother never let Polylas publish the poem.

In 1833, Solomos wrote his first important work during his maturity, O Kritikos (The Cretan), in iambic fifteen-syllable verse, as a result of the Cretan's literature influence. The work describes the story of a Cretan who left from Crete after the revolution was lost in 1826, the shipwreck and his efforts to save his beloved from the tempest. A central point in the work is the apparition of an oracle, the Feggarontymeni (meaning the one dressed by the moon). The narrator of the story is the Cretan himself: he starts telling his story many years later, when he is living alone as a beggar, doing flashbacks (from his life on Crete and the shipwreck) and talking about the future (the resurrection of the dead and his encounter with his beloved one in Paradise). O Kritikos is aesthetically the most complete poem. There is juxtaposition of storm imagery and the pursuit by the Turks. The problem troubling language specialists is the interpretation of the Feggarontymeni's figure. Some think the figure is an allusion to the Virgin Mary. She is described as the 'goddess' and reads in his heart the story of his heroic and ultimately futile struggles against the Turks in his native island which all but charms him out of his mortal body. David Ricks writes with respect to her identity, "we must hold in balance the soul of the expiring fiancée, the kindly presence of the Motherland and a recollection of our Lady".

Between 1833 and 1844, Solomos edited the second draft of The Free Besieged, a poem inspired by the Third Siege of Missolonghi and the heroic exodus of its inhabitants, written in a rhyming fifteen-syllable verse. After 1845, the poet started working on the poem once more, this time without using rhyme. The poem describes the last days of the siege, when food supplies were exhausted and it was certain that the city would fall. The notes written by the poet in Italian are very useful for the poem's interpretation. These notes are included in the Polylas edition. The central theme of the poem is willpower and the struggle with the temptations of nature that give birth to the will for life. There are three fragmentary drafts of this unfinished work, each draft longer and more thoroughly worked than the previous one, all of which show glimpses of what the finished poem could have been; yet the three drafts are considered possibly the finest moment of modern Greek poetry. This opinion of reverence and awe is not only one expressed by critics and scholars, but also by all major Greek poets who have invariably referred to Dionysios Solomos as a poet far superior than themselves.

The last work of maturity is "O Pórfyras" (The Shark), written in 1847. The poet was inspired by a real incident, when a shark mangled an English soldier swimming in Corfu harbor. Porfyras is a difficult poem to interpret, mostly because of its fragmented nature. This poem also refers to the relation between nature and man and the body's and soul's dimension.

The fragmented poems Lampros and Porfyras show the romantic impulse of Solomos (melancholy, gothic and supernatural, influenced by both Byron and Leopardi).

The poem Ode to the death of Lord Byron, is labeled lyrical and was written after Byron died during the siege of Mesolongi, but the subject matter and form are epic.

In the works of The Hymn to Liberty and Ode to the death of Lord Byron there are several direct and indirect references to Byron's works. A good example is a reference (in Solomos' own footnotes) to Byron's Don Juan, where in Canto the Third (The Greek Isles 15) a Greek poet says:

Fill high the bowl with Samian wine!

Our virgins dance beneath the shade –
I see their glorious black eyes shine;
But gazing on each glowing maid,
My own the burning tear-drop laves,

To think such breasts must suckle slaves.

=== Minor works ===
Solomos also wrote translations of Italian poetry and Desdemona's song from Shakespeare's Othello, epigrams, other miscellaneous verse, satirical poems in Zakynthian dialect, and two prose works, including the tragic/mystical The Woman of Zakynthos. Of his attempts to translate parts of the Iliad into modern Greek only a couple of dozen lines remain.

=== Acceptance of his work ===
Since the beginning, Solomos was in the center of the literary circles of Zakynthos. After the Hymn to Liberty's publication, his fame spread throughout the Greek state. On the Ionian Islands and in Athens, the poet was known only by his published poems: the Hymn to Liberty, the abstract from Maria's prayer, Lampros, the Ode to the Nun and his poems written in his youth, many of them which were spread by word of mouth and many of them were set to music. This means that his contemporaries' opinion was formed by these works and it was thanks to these works that Solomos gained the fame that lasted until his death. The most important representatives of the First Athenian School admired Solomos' works even though they expressed their objections about the language used by the poet. In 1827, Iakovos Rizos Neroulos wrote in the Cours de la littérature grecque moderne: "Dionysios Solomos' poems... have the value of a strong and fascinating inspiration, a fantasy full of courage and fertility". Alexandros Soutsos in the poem Letter to King Otto described Solomos (and Andreas Kalvos) as a great maker of odes who, however, neglected the beauties of the language and presented rich ideas poorly clad. Alexandros Rizos Ragkavis in Esquisses de la littérature grecque moderne wrote: his spirit makes him one of Greece's greatest glories... Solomos shone like the most beautiful gem of Greece's poetical crown. Even before his death, Solomos' poetical work was identified with the fatherland's concept; in 1849, the newspaper Aion wrote: "the poetry of Solomos is not the poetry of a single person but the poetry of a whole nation". Similar judgements were expressed even after the poet's death. The magazine Pandora wrote: "one of the finest poets of Greece and of Europe, the author of the dithyramb to Liberty, Dionysios Solomos from Zakynthos died at a thriving age". The funeral orations of Solomos' students were of course more essential and referred to the poet's unpublished works, many of which they had heard their teacher reciting. Ioulios Typaldos described Solomos as the "first and greatest founder of a new type of literature" and Iakovos Polylas in Solomos' poems "Prolegomena" in 1859 refers to him as "the national poet".

The perception of Solomos' work changed radically after the long-awaited publication in 1859. His uncompleted work was an unpleasant surprise and created puzzlement to the newspapers which praised the greatest Greek poet after his death did not mention anything about the publication of the works. Valaoritis wrote to Constantinos Asopius in 1859 after the poet's death: "the nation's hopes were deceived" and in 1877 in a letter to Emmanouil Roidis he wrote that Solomos left us "only a hymn and some incoherent verses". Spyridon Trikoupis also expressed negative comments about Solomos' poems in his essay "Where does the common word "tragoudo" (i.e. "I am singing") derive from?" written in 1859.

The first revaluation of Solomos' work outside the Ionian region started after 1880, especially after the critical work of Kostis Palamas, who acknowledged the historical importance of Solomos' work, which is characterized by the creation of a personal poetic language and the combination of all elements of the poetical tradition and the European poetical currents and ideas.

=== Formal elements ===
The poet used different metrical and rhyme forms, starting with some influenced by Italian poetry (sonnet form, rhymed trochaic tetrameters) and settling into the standard forms of Greek folk songs (iambic 15-syllable blank verse). His epigram on the destruction of Psara, an event of the Greek War of Independence, influenced by classical forms, is a marvel of rhythm and brevity in six lines of anapaest.

=== The fragmented nature of Solomos' works ===
One of the most important issues of Solomic poetry and of Greek literature in general is the fragmented nature of the poet's works. The only works published during Solomos' lifetime were the Hymn to Liberty (1825), an extract from Lampros ("Maria's prayer") (1834), the Ode to the Nun (1829) and the epigram To Francisca Fraser (1849). The rest of his works remained incomplete. Solomos was constantly editing his works and was striving towards total perfection of form, making efforts to get rid of anything excessive that destroyed their essential lyrical substance. His manuscripts do not comprise engrossed works; on the contrary, they reveal all stages of editing, without their latest version being the final one. At first, the poet conceptualized a draft of the poem written in Italian prose and after that he used to start editing the Greek version. Many of the verses are saved in the form of alternative versions, often in the wrong order, some incomplete and with many gaps. The poet often used to write verses of different poems on the same piece of paper. The poem 'The Cretan' (1833), written about the Cretan revolution was one of his most famous poems. It is highly fragmented, however, this adds to the tormented atmosphere of the dramatic monologue because the speaker is a beggar whose life has been torn apart and who is in emotional turmoil, his entire family killed by the Turks.

A faithful student of Solomos, Iakovos Polylas, affronted many difficulties when he undertook the publication of his "teacher's" work (that was long-awaited, not only in the Ionian Islands but also the rest of Greece). First of all, Polylas had to ask permission from the poet's brother Dimitrios in order to be able to study the poet's manuscripts. After that, he had to arrange the scattered material (written in the poet's difficult to decipher handwriting) so as to present an as much as possible complete and coherent work. Polylas piled and arranged this material, choosing the verses that he thought were closest in meaning to what the poet had in mind. Sometimes Polylas added verses that he had heard Solomos recite and wrote down some alternative versions. In 1859, Polylas published the work of Solomos under the title "Apanta ta Evriskomena- Omnibus of the works found", accompanying this work with an exceptional introduction, in which he stated that the poet's manuscripts with their definitive form were lost.

=== Attempt to interpret the fragmented works ===
The form of Solomos' work as presented in its first edition was the source of disappointment, because at that time the work's value could not be appreciated. Polylas in his "Prolegomena" stressed that the major manuscripts of the poems' final version were either lost or destroyed. People assumed that the works may have been stolen by Solomos' servant or by the poet's brother Dimitrios or even that the poet himself destroyed them. Only in the beginning of the 20th century was it made clear that no more manuscripts existed and that Solomos had not completed his poems. The first attempts to interpret the fragmented nature of the poet's work were mostly based on theories having nothing to do with the texts themselves: the difficulty to complete the works was thought to be due to the lack of an appropriate intellectual atmosphere that would provide Solomos with the motivation to complete his works, or due to the lack of an adequate literary tradition that the poet could have followed. The fragmentation of Solomos' work was also attributed to psychological factors, such as the poet's alcoholism, the lack of compositive capability, the negative effects of the 1833–1838 trial, Solomos' perfectionism or his feeling of dissatisfaction.

Other scholars underlined however that, to a great extent, Solomos did not care about the completion of his poems. A phrase attributed to the poet is illustrative: "Lampros will remain an abstract, because the whole poem does not reach the height of some days". Linos Politis notes on the fragmentary nature of the Free Besieged: "He did not want or did not care to incorporate these lyrical pieces into a narrative group ... He stuck to the pure, lyrical expression, without regard to the non-lyrical linking substance, thus advancing ... to the conquest of a 'pure' lyrical sphere, long before his time. We detected something similar in Kritikos too and the same thing is applied to the rest of his 'fragmented' works". Later on, Solomos was considered by several poets and critics as the forerunner of "pure poetry" and the fragmented nature of his work did not "disturb" any more; on the contrary, it was considered as an advantage.

During the last decade, attempts have been made to associate the incomplete Solomian works with the fragmentary works of romantic literature (such as Kubla Khan by Coleridge, Giaour by Lord Byron and Heinrich von Oftendingen by Novalis), even though this interpretation is not accepted by all scholars.

=== Publication issue ===
From 1920 to 1930, an issue arose concerning the publication of works that were not included in Iakovos Polylas' edition such as The Woman of Zakynthos, the satirical The Gallows and several Italian sonnets that were published by K. Kairofylas in 1927. The Academy of Athens decided to publish Solomos' poems accompanied by a critical edition by N.B. Tomadakis, thus contributing to the discussion about whether a genuine (as Linos Politis was in favor of) or a critical edition of Solomos' works would be best. The critical edition was never published and the two classical scholars prepared "easy to use" editions of the poems, aiming at a wider range of readers. In 1964, Linos Politis published the poet's manuscripts using photographic reprint and typographical transcription. This edition constitutes a turn-point in the research on the Solomian works because not only was the poet's way of work revealed but also because the scholars had the opportunity to study all of the poet's editing phases and maybe even propose new editions.

The contemporary editing attempts of the solomic work can be divided into two categories: the "analytical" edition which reveals the successive editing stages of every poem and its different versions, such as Politis had proposed and intended to realize; the "synthetical" edition which presents the work with a logical sequence and a completion of form, excluding verses or abstracts that do no fulfill these criteria. A sample of "synthetical" edition is the one of Stylianos Alexiou (1994), that was strongly criticized by the supporters of "analytical" approach.

== Surviving works at his death ==
The poet's work at his death was mostly unfinished and in fragments, and was edited and published by his friend and fellow poet Iakovos Polylas. Whether Solomos was never satisfied with his work and kept little of it, whether large parts of his manuscripts were lost (something Polylas implies), or whether he had difficulties fleshing out the ambitious structure of his planned works is not clear, but the fragments show a huge disconnect between intention and surviving work: The Cretan begins with a fragment of Canto 18 and ends with Canto 22, and none of them are complete; Lambros was conceived with at least 38 cantos (of some of them only a prose summary survives), with the shortest poetic fragment consisting of a single line, and the longest containing 33 stanzas; the second draft of The Free Besieged consists of 61 fragments, of which 27 are single lines, seven are two lines, and two are half-lines.

== Legacy ==
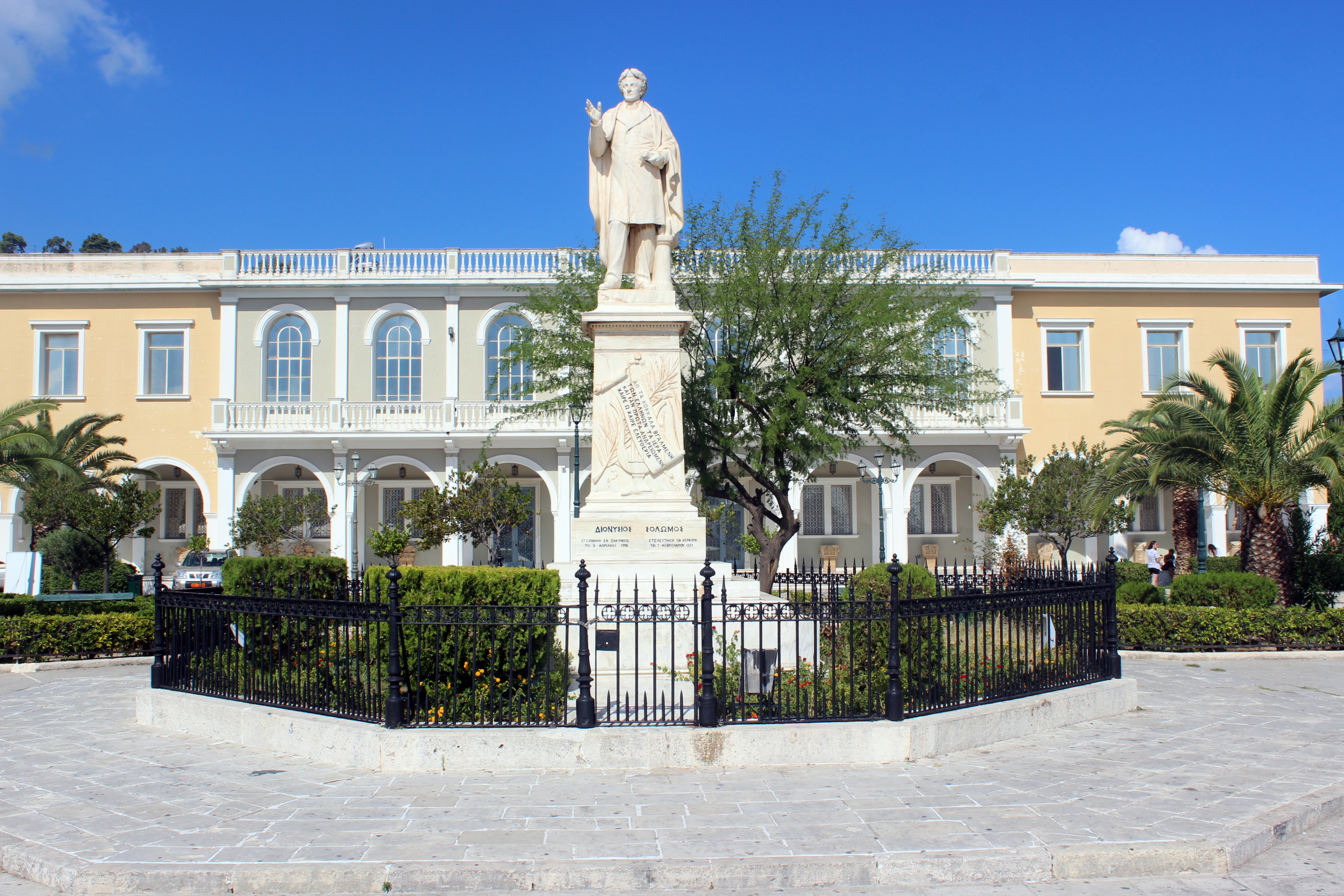
The statue of Solomos in Solomos Square, Zakynthos

Solomos is commonly referred to as Greece's "national poet" for his important legacy to Greek literature and national identity.

The Museum of Solomos and Eminent Zakynthians was founded in 1959, located in St Mark's Plaza in Zakynthos city. It features him and Andreas Kalvos prominently. He has been interred in the mausoleum since 1968.

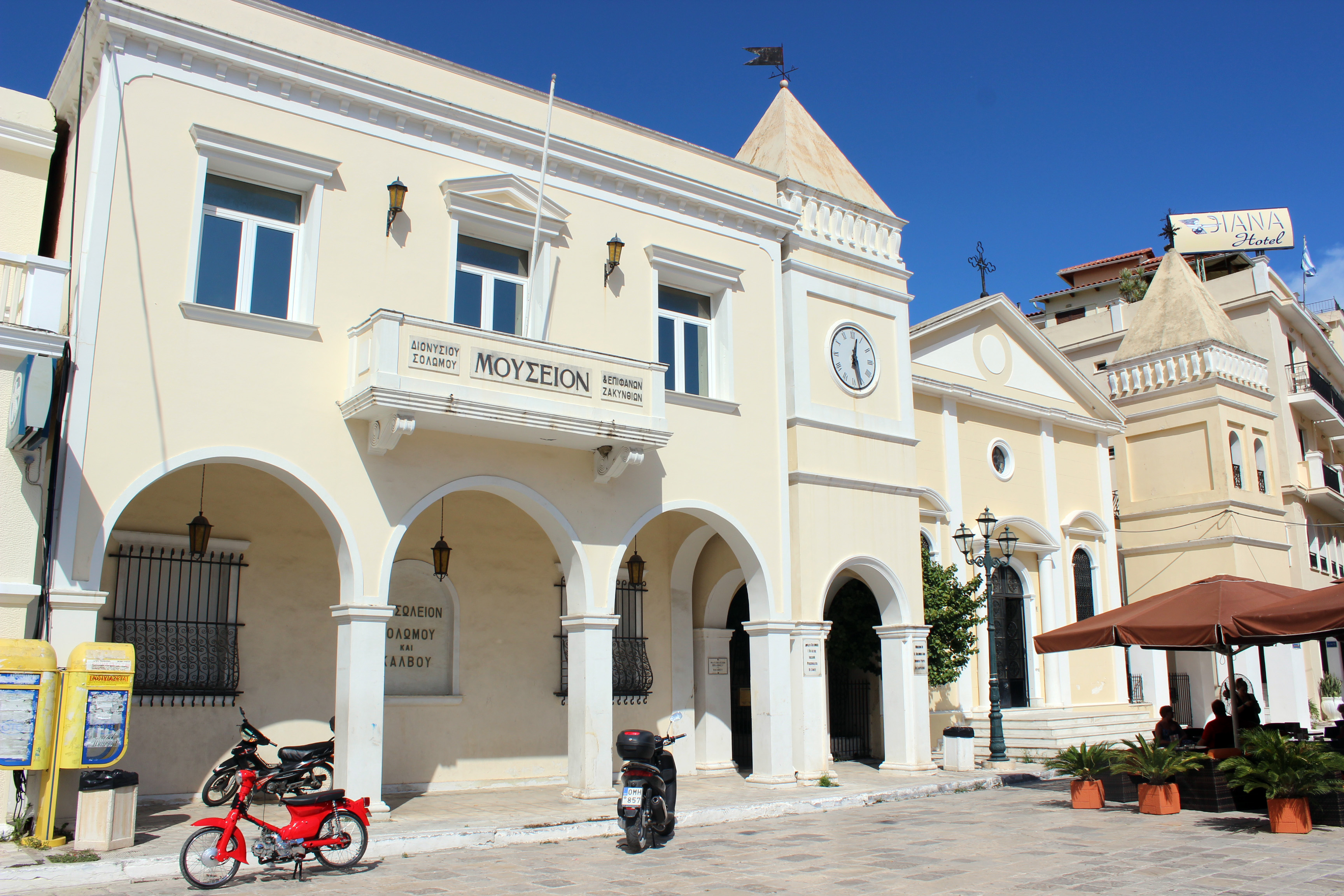
Solomos Museum and Saint Mark’s Church

He was depicted on the reverse of the Greek ₯20 coin of 1990–2001. A 50 drachmas commemorative coin was issued in 1998 for the 200th anniversary of his birth.

The international airport on the island of Zakynthos and a square in Nicosia, Cyprus, are named after Dionysis Solomos.

The film Eternity and a Day (1998) depicts a dying Greek poet who attempts to complete some of Solomos' unfinished works. He also sees visions of Solomos (played by Fabrizio Bentivoglio) as he travels around Thessaloniki.

== Works ==
=== Greek poems ===
==== His first works ====
- Eis korin i opoia anethrefeto mesa eis monastiri-To the girl who was brought up in a monastery
- Sto thanato tis mikris anipsias-To the small niece's death
- Pothos-Desire
- I skia tou Omirou-Homer's shadow
- Anamnisis-Remembrance
- Evrikomi
- Eis filon psyxoraggounta-To a friend near death
- O thanatos tis orfanis-The orphan's death
- To oneiro-The dream
- O thanatos tou voskou-The shepherd's death
- H Psyxoula-The little soul
- Pros ton Kyrion Lodovikon Strani-To sir Lodovikos Stranis
- Pros ton Kyrion Georgion Dhe Rossi-To sir Georgios De Rossi
- I Agnoristi-The Unrecognizable
- Kakioma-The miff

==== 1823–1833: the period of formation ====
- Hymn to Liberty (1823)
- Nekriki Odi-Funerary Ode
- Poiima lyrikon eis to thanato tou Lord Byron-Lyrical poem "To the death of Lord Byron (1824)
- Eis monachin-To a nun (1829)
- Eis Marko Botsari-To Markos Botsaris (1823)
- I katastrofi ton Psaron-The destruction of Psara (1824)
- Eis to thanato kyrias Agglidas-To the English lady's death
- I Farmakomeni-The poisoned (1826)
- I Farmakomeni ston Adi-The poisoned in Hades
- Lampros (1829)

==== Great works of maturity ====
- O Kritikos-The Cretan (1833)
- Eleftheroi Poliorkimenoi-The Free Besieged (1826–1844)
- Porfyras-The Whale (1849)

==== Last drafts ====
- Nikiforos o Vryennios
- Eis to thanato Aimilias Rodostamo-To the death of Emilia Rodostamo (1848)
- Eis Fragkiskan Fraizer-To Francisca Fraser (1849)
- Eis to thanato tis anipsias tou-To the death of his niece
- Pros ton Vasilea tis Elladas-To the King of Greece
- O Anatolikos Polemos-The Eastern War
- Carmen Seculare
- Ellinida Mitera-Greek Mother

==== Satirical works ====
- I Protochronia-The New Year's Eve (1824)
- To Iatrosymvoulio-The Doctors' council (1825)
- To oneiro-The dream (1826)
- H Tricha-The Hair (1833)

=== Translations ===
- I anoixi-Spring by Metastasio
- To kalokairi-Summer by Metastasio
- Odi tou Petrarchi-Petrarca's Ode

=== Greek prose ===
- O Dialogos-The Dialogue (1822–1825)
- H Gynaika tis Zakynthos-The Woman of Zakynthos (1826–1829)

=== Italian poems (selection) ===
==== Early works ====
- La Distruzione di Gierusalemme-Jerusalem's destruction
- Ode per la prima messa-Ode to the first mass
- Rime Improvvisate (collection, 1822)

==== Incomplete poems of the last period ====
- La navicella Greca-The Greek little boat
- Saffo-Sappho
- Orfeo, sonetto-Orpheus
- Sonetto in morte di Stelio Marcoran-A sonnet on the death of Stelios Marcoras
- L'albero mistico (frammento-extract)-The mystical tree
- L'avvelenata (frammenti)-The poisoned
- Il giovane guerriero (frammenti)-The young warrior

==== Drafts of poems written in prose ====
- La madre Greca-The Greek Mother
- La donna velata-The veiled woman
- L'usignolo e lo sparviere-The nightingale and the falcon
- Orfeo-Orpheus
- Porfyras

==== Italian prose ====
- Per Dr. Spiridione Gripari (funeral oration, 1820)
- Elogio di Ugo Foscolo (oratio in memoriam, 1827)

== Sources ==
- Evripidis Garantoudis, The Ionians and Solomos. Aspects of a complicated relation (1820–1950), Kastaniotis, Athens 2001
- Romilly Jenkins, Dionysius Solomós (Cambridge 1940; reprinted by Denise Harvey, Athens 1981)
- Eratosthenis G. Kapsomenos, Solomos and the Hellenic Cultural Tradition, Greek Parliament, Athens 1998
- Ε. Kapsomenos, "Kali 'nai i mavri petra sou". Interpretation keys for Solomos, Estia, Athens 2000
- E. Kriaras, Dionysios Solomos, Estia, Athens 1969, 2nd edition
- Peter Mackridge, Dionysios Solomos, translation by Katerina Aggelaki-Rooke Kastaniotis, Athens 1995
- L. Politis, About Solomos, National Bank of Greece, Athens 1985
- M. B. Raizis, Dionysios Solomos (1972) (Twayne's World authors)
- David Ricks, "Dionysios Solomos (1798–1857)", Modern Greek writing. An anthology in English translation, Peter Owen, London 2003
- Giorgos Veloudis, Dionysios Solomos. Romantic poetry and poetic. The German sources, Gnosi, Athens 2000
- Giorgos Veloudis, Critics on Solomos, Dodoni, Athens 2000
- K. Zanou, "Dionysios Solomos: A Life in Translation", in Transnational Patriotism in the Mediterranean, 1800–1850: Stammering the Nation, Oxford 2018, part I, chapter 3, pp. 54–61
