= Andreas Laskaratos =

Greek satirical poet and writer

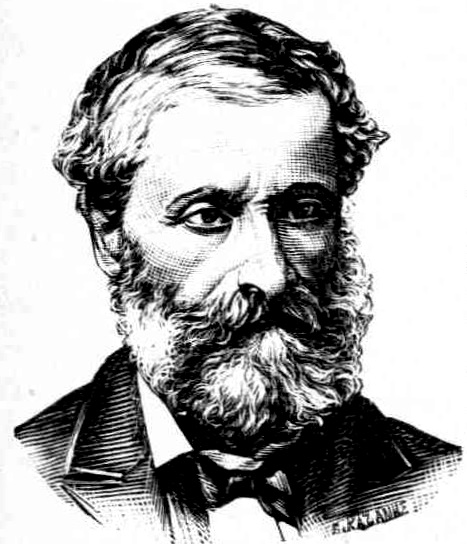
Andreas Laskaratos

Andreas Laskaratos (Greek: Ανδρέας Λασκαράτος; 1 May 1811 – 23/24 July 1901) was a satirical poet and writer from the Ionian island of Cefalonia (or Kefallinia), representative of the Heptanese school. He was excommunicated by the Greek Orthodox Church because his satire targeted many of the church's prominent members.

== Biography ==
Andreas Laskaratos was born in Lixouri in 1811, at the time when the Ionian Islands were moving from the French to the British as a protectorate. He was considered to be highly spirited by nature, intelligent and glib. He was intensely satirical and constant in his views, publishing works which contrasted the views of his time. The fact that he did not hesitate to freely express his views by criticizing hypocrisy became the main reason behind his arrest and imprisonment, persecutions, and excommunication by the church.

He lived through the entire process of unification of the Ionian Islands with mainland Greece but he distanced himself from the opinions of most leaders of the pro-unification movement. During his persecution he lived at times in Corfu, Zakynthos, London and Argostoli, where he died in 1901.

Being brought up in a wealthy aristocratic family of land-owners, he studied law in Paris, but only practised law when he was in financial need. He was the student of the great poet Andreas Kalvos and also met Greece's 'national poet' Dionysios Solomos, both of whom influenced his later course. He worked as a journalist and published poetry but is more well known as a writer of satire. He married Penelope Korgialeniou (Πηνελόπη Κοργιαλένιου), also from a wealthy family, who bore him two sons and seven daughters. His niece Eleni Lambiri was a conductor, librettist and composer.

He published several satirical newspapers such as Lychnos (Λύχνος) that criticized immorality, injustice and hypocrisy. On many occasions he turned against politicians and their incompetence while he also fought against religious prejudices and the corruption of religious authority.

His main works include:

- Ta mistiria tis Kefalonias (Τα μυστήρια της Κεφαλονιάς) "The mysteries of Cephalonia"
- Idou o anthropos i anthropinoi charaktires (Ιδού ο άνθρωπος ή ανθρώπινοι χαρακτήρες) "Ecce homo or human characters"
- Poiimata kai anekdota (Ποιήματα και ανέκδοτα) "Poems and anecdotes"
- Oi katadromes mou eksaitias tou "Lychnou" (Οι καταδρομές μου εξαιτίας του «Λύχνου») "The troubles Lychnos caused me"
- Apokrisi ston aforismo (Απόκριση στον αφορισμό) "Response to aphorism"
- Aftoviografia (Αυτοβιογραφία) "Autobiography"

== Anecdotal incidents ==
- On his birthday, a neighbour in order to make fun of him sent him a basket full of goat's horns (implying his wife's adultery) with the inscription "For your birthday". Laskaratos replied by sending him a basket full of flowers: "One can only give away what one has in plenty".

== Published works ==
- Poiimata (Ποιήματα) "Poems", ed. Φέξης, Athens, 1916
- Stochasmoi (Στοχασμοί) "Ponderings", ed. Γανιάρης και Σία (Ganiaris et co.), 1921
- Ithi, ethima kai doksasies tis Kefalonias (Ήθη, έθιμα και δοξασίες της Κεφαλλονιάς) "Ways, mores and beliefs of Cephalonia", ed. Ελευθερουδάκης, Athens, 1924
- Aftoviogrfafia (Αυτοβιογραφία) "Autobiography", ed. Δημητράκος, Athens, 1927
- Ta pathimata kai oi paratiriseis mou stis filakes tis kefalonias (Τα παθήματά μου και οι παρατηρήσεις μου στις φυλακές της Κεφαλλονιάς) "My misfortunes and observations in the jail of Cephalonia", ed. Κοντομάρης και Σία, Athens, 1930
- Techni tou dimigorein kai singrafein (Τέχνη του δημηγορείν και συγγράφειν) "Art of declaiming and writing", ed. Κολιατσάδα, Athens, 1954
- Apanta (3 volumes) (Άπαντα) "Omnibus", Athens, 1959
- Viografika mou enthimimata (Βιογραφικά μου ενθυμήματα) "My biographical rememberings", Athens, 1966
- Idou o anthropos (Ιδού ο άνθρωπος), ed. Πάπυρος, Athens, 1969
- Ena anekdoto poiima (Ένα ανέκδοτο ποίημα) "An unpublished poem", ed. Κείμενα, 1976
