= World Day for Greek Language =

The World Day for Greek Language is celebrated annually on 9 February, the anniversary of the death of Dionysios Solomos, the national poet of Greece. It was established by UNESCO General Conference and is celebrated worldwide.

In 2026, for the first time, Monday 9 February, marked the inaugural celebration of World Day for Greek Language, and tributes were paid from across Europe in recognition of Greece's historical impact on life, literature and thought in Western society. The people of Greece and lovers of the language were marked its official global celebration on the first ever 'World Greek Language Day'.

== History ==
The initiative to establish a day dedicated to the Greek language began in 2014, inspired by Professor Giannis Korinthios, then President of the Federation of Greek Communities and Brotherhoods of Italy. Classical lyceums and the Greek Community of Naples and Campania played a leading role in mobilizing support for the establishment of the day.

Initially, a draft law entitled “Establishment of a World Day of Greek Language and Greek Culture” was proposed, with 20 May—considered a possible date of birth of Socrates—as the suggested date. Ultimately, following a proposal by cultural management advisor Ilias Bountouris, 9 February was selected, the commemorative day of Dionysios Solomos (1798–1857).

The observance was established in 2017 by a joint decision of the Ministers of the Interior, Foreign Affairs, and Education of Greece. Subsequently, by a Joint Ministerial Decision (Government Gazette, 24 April 2017, no. 1384), the title “World Greek Language Day” was formally adopted. In November 2025, during the proceedings of the 43rd session of the UNESCO General Conference in Samarkand, Uzbekistan, the international observance of 9 February as World Greek Language Day was officially proclaimed.

To mark the occasion, events are held at educational institutions in Greece as well as in university departments of Greek language studies around the world.
