= Arvanitakis family =

Arvanitakis Αρβανιτάκης Arvanitachi
- Country: Republic of Venice; United Kingdom; Greece
- Current region: Crete; Corfu; Paxos; Kefalonia; Zakinthos
- Origin: Kingdom of Candia, Republic of Venice (now Greece)
- Founded: 15th century
- Distinctions: Entered in the Libro d'Oro of: Corfu; Paxos; Kefalonia; Zakinthos
- Traditions: Iconographer-priests

The Arvanitakis family (Greek: Αρβανιτάκης; Italian: Arvanitachi) is a Cretan family also found in the Ionian Islands and elsewhere in Greece. The family are particularly famous for the many generations of iconographer-priests which they produced. Other members of the family were soldiers, statesmen, merchants, doctors and lawyers.

== Origin ==
The name 'Arvanitakis' (or 'Arvanitachi' in Venetian) is a nickname meaning 'little Arvanite', which dates from the days of Venetian service and was adopted in Crete in the 15th century. The first members of the family were mercenary stradioti for the Republic of Venice. They were granted land in Vleroma in Crete in return for their military service and entered the Venetian nobility.

The family fought for the Republic of Venice throughout all of the Ottoman-Venetian wars until the Ottoman capture of Crete in 1669. Some members of the family remained on Crete where they were known as being fierce warlords (captains). Other members of the family moved elsewhere to continue their service to the Venetian Republic. In 1671 the first Arvanitakis arrived in Zakinthos, with other members of the family settling in Paxos and Corfu, all of which were Venetian territories. The family were entered into the Libro d'Oro of Paxos in the 17th century. They were entered into the Libro d'Oro of Corfu in 1803. They were entered into the Libro d'Oro of Zakinthos on 25 September 1785. The Kefalonia branch had their noble status confirmed by the British on 10 February 1841. During the Venetian and British eras the family were educated at Italian universities such as Padua and Pisa and so were culturally more Italian than Greek until the reunification of the Ionian Islands with the Kingdom of Greece in 1862.

The coat of arms of the family used since at least the 17th century are Party per fess argent and azure, two bends counterchanged, with the coronet of a Venetian Patrician.

== Zantiot branch ==
In 1904, Ludwig Salvator writes how the Arvanitakis family were among the 16 most important families on the island of Zakinthos. The Arvanitakis family had vineyards in Agrilia in Zakinthos and were one of the largest wine producers on the island in the late 19th century. The family also produced their own variety of snuff.

Following the custom of the Venetians, the Arvanitakis family were an urban noble family and had their seat in the main town of Zakinthos. This was destroyed in the earthquake of 1953 but was one of the largest palazzi in the town. It was built in the 18th century in Venetian Palladian style with five doric columns on the ground floor, arched loggia and triglyphs above. The upper two stories were planned in a 'giant' style with large columns extending over the two upper stories. In the atrium of the house was a bust of the Roman emperor Vitellius which survived the earthquake of 1953 and was donated by Dr Giovanni Arvanitachi to the Museum of Zakynthos.

The Zakinthos branch of the family is famous for producing many iconographers. Many of these icons, which are produced in the Heptanese School, remain among the best examples of 17th–18th century icons on the island. Famous members include: Don Pancratio Arvanitachi (fl. 1635); Don Niccolo Arvanitachi (fl. 1718); Don Eustacchio Arvanitachi (fl. 1732–1743); Don Pancratio Arvanitachi (18th century) and Don Niccolo Arvanitachi (fl. 1784–1787).

== Notable Members ==
- Captain Zorzi Arvanitachi (17th Century), Venetian stratioti captain on Crete.
- Captain Spiridon Arvanitachi of Zakinthos (fl. 1820–1844), son of Don Zorzi Arvanitachi, Greek revolutionary who was initiated into the Filiki Eteria in 1820 and led a company of Kefallonians in the Wallachia Uprising of 1821 and afterwards sought asylum in Odessa in Russia. In 1826 he entered the Greek Civil Service where he served in Nafplion (c. 1837) and was later Superintendent of Amaliapoli in 1844.
- Dr. Demetrio Arvanitakis of Zakinthos (fl. 1780–1823), son of Giovanni Arvanitachi, signatory to the 1817 constitution of the United States of the Ionian Islands and first Senator of Zakinthos. He was Prefect of Zakinthos in 1823 and said to be a close associate of Sir Thomas Maitland.
- Dionysios Arvanitakis MP of Zakinthos (fl. 1795–1809), son of Giovanni Arvanitakis, President of College of Lawyers in Zakinthos and Interim Governor of Zakinthos 1805–1809. From 1809 he was MP for Zakinthos.
- Elena Arvanitaki (b. 1802), daughter of Dr. Demetrio Arvanitachi and wife of Count Dimitri Solomos GCMG, Deputy President of the Ionian Parliament, and elder brother to the national poet of Greece Dionysios Solomos. His play The Woman of Zakynthos (1826–29) is said to be based on Elena's infidelities.
- Dr. Spiridon Arvanitakis MP of Corfu (1802–1880), son of Niccolo Arvanitakis MP, he was Professor of Medicine at the Ionian Academy 1844-1865 who controversially introduced lectures in Greek (which previously had only been in Italian). He was a founding member of the Literary Society of Corfu and a member of the Société Phrénologique de Paris. In 1852 he was elected MP for the Ionian Parliament and was a member of the Party of Radicals who campaigned for the unification of the Ionian Islands with the Kingdom of Greece. One of the main streets in Corfu town is named after him.
- Captains Dimitrios and Christos Arvanitakis (fl. 1870), two brothers who led a gang of brigands in the 19th century and fought at the Battle of Mouzaki.
- Leandro Arvanitakis (1823–1892), Professor of Latin and Greek at the Halki Seminary.
- George Arvanitakis (1872–1946), son of above, Professor of Science at University of Athens.
- Evangelos Arvanitakis MP (1907–1971), Minister of Communications in the Greek Government who was arrested during the Junta of 1967-74.
