= Anastasios Polyzoidis =

Greek politician and judicial official (1802–1873)

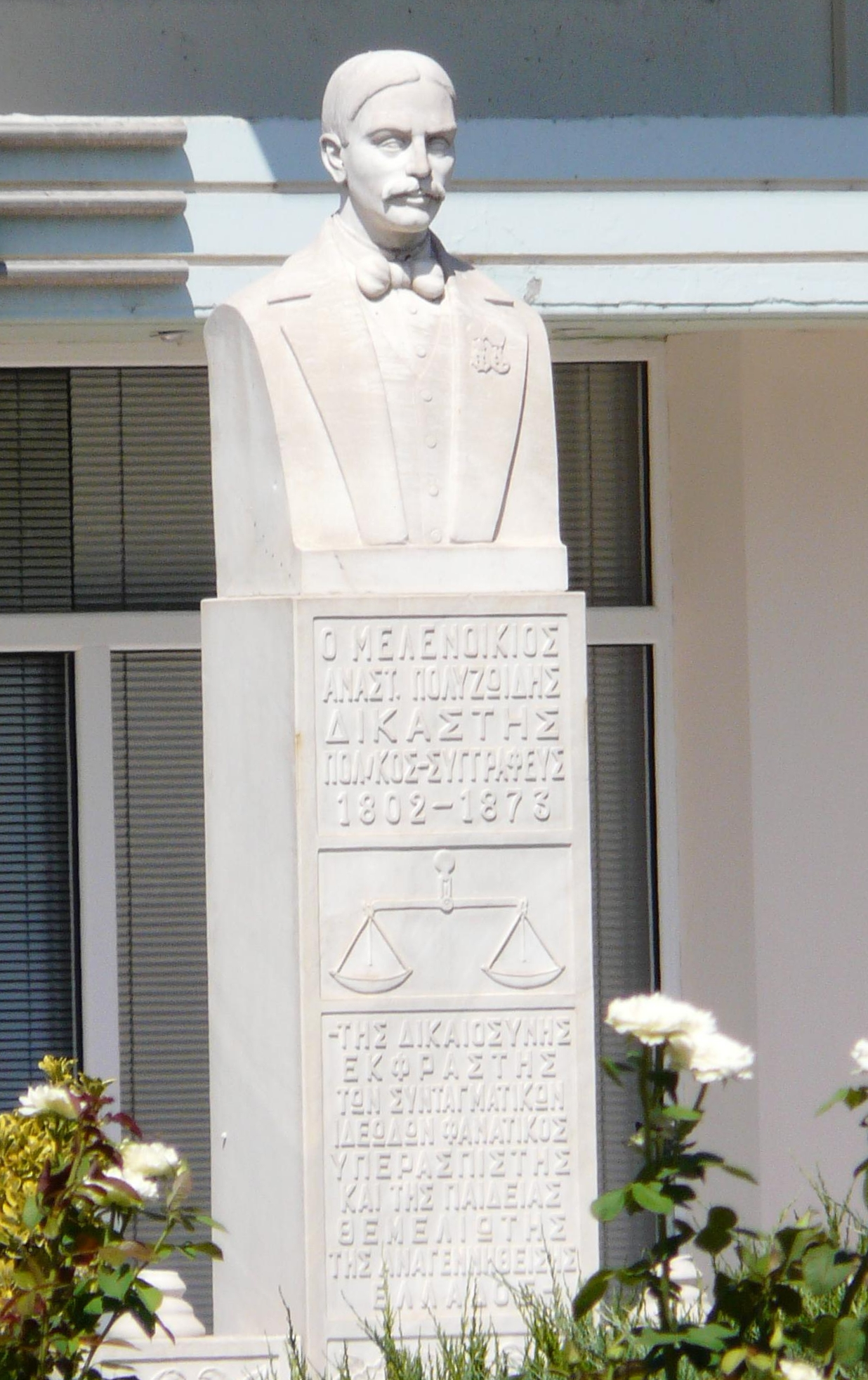
Bust of Polyzoidis at Sidirokastro

Anastasios Polyzoidis (Greek: Αναστάσιος Πολυζωίδης, 1802–1873) was a Greek politician and judicial official.

He was born in Melnik, Ottoman Empire (nowadays in Bulgaria), where he graduated local Greek school. From 1818 he was studying law, history and social studies in Vienna, Göttingen and Berlin. At the outbreak of the Greek War of Independence, he interrupted his studies and returned to Greece. After a series of adventures he reached Trieste, and from there he passed to Missolonghi along with some philhellenes.

In Missolonghi he cooperated with Alexandros Mavrokordatos and was set in several gubernatorial positions (secretary of executive) in the Provisional Administration of Greece. He took part in the First Greek National Assembly at Epidaurus. There, almost on his own, he wrote the new state's constitution and the declaration of 15 January 1822, which informed the European powers, allied in the Holy Alliance, that the revolution was national and not social. In 1823 he was in charge of the committee, which was sent to London for the negotiation of a public loan. In 1827, he was elected representative to the National Convention at Troezen. In October of the same year, he went to Paris, in order to continue his studies.

Returning from Paris, Polyzoidis found himself pitted against the autocratic government of Governor Ioannis Kapodistrias, and soon passed into the opposition, editing the newspaper Apollon, printed at Hydra. In 1834 he was nominated by the Bavarian regency to be president of a five-member court of Nafplio, which had to judge Theodoros Kolokotronis, Dimitrios Plapoutas and other former leaders of the War of Independence on trumped-up charges of treason. Polyzoidis, together with fellow judge Georgios Tertsetis, knowing very well the innocence of the defendants, refused to countersign the decision of condemnation. The Minister of Justice, Konstantinos Schinas, personally intervened to force Polyzoidis to append his signature to the document "in the name of the King", to which Polyzoidis replied: "I prefer my hand to be cut off rather than sign." His stance caused his imprisonment and violent maltreatment. This refusal to accept royal intervention in the administration of justice was indicative of Polyzoidis' integrity, and his portrait, together with that of Tertsetis, now hangs in the Areios Pagos, the Supreme Court of Greece.

After the coming of age of king Otto, he was rehabilitated and nominated as vice-president of the Areios Pagos and counselor of state. In 1837, he was named minister of education and of internal affairs. In the former capacity, he was instrumental in the establishment of Greece's first university in Athens, while from his latter post he fought against censorship. Following the overthrow of Otto in 1862, he was appointed prefect of the joint Attica and Boeotia Prefecture. He died in Athens in 1873.

The events of the trial of Kolokotronis and the consecutive trial of Polyzoidis and Tertsetis have been portrayed in the 1974 Greek Film "Η δίκη των Δικαστών".
