= Solomos Museum =

Museum in Zakynthos, Greece

Coordinates: 37°47′18″N 20°53′55″E

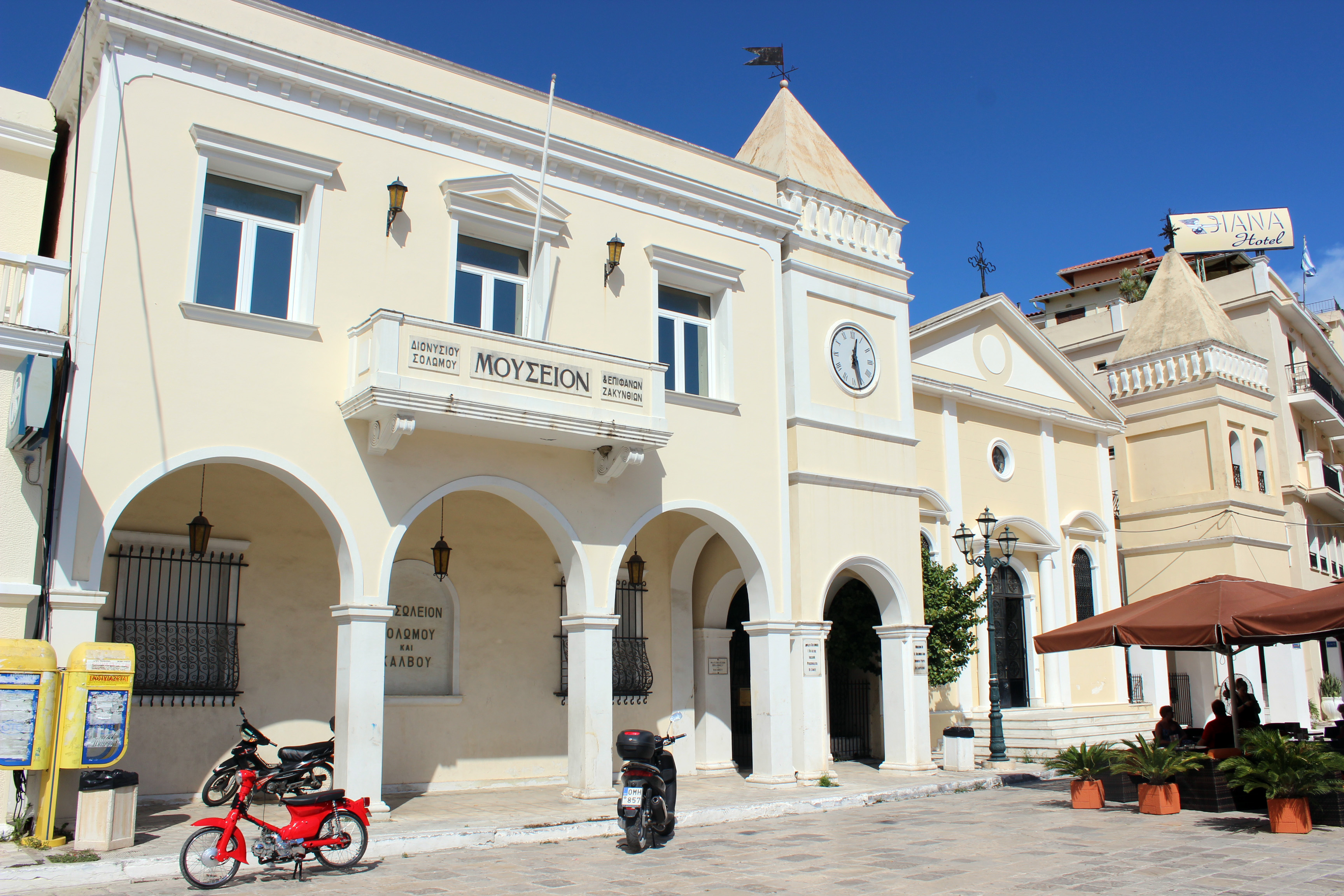
Museum in 2012

The Solomos Museum (Greek: Μουσείου Σολωμού και Επιφανών Ζακυνθίων); officially known as the Museum of Solomos and Eminent Zakynthians, is a museum dedicated to Dionysios Solomos and Andreas Kalvos. Founded in 1959, it is located in St. Mark's Square, in the northern part of Zakynthos. The museum features local art from the 18th and 19th centuries, sculptures, musical instruments contemporary to the eminent Zakynthians, and ceramics. There are also portraits dedicated to the most important people of the island. Since March 2022, its head is a female mathematician Eleni Pylarinou.

== History ==
Dionysios Solomos (April 8, 1798 - February 9, 1857) was a Greek poet born in Zakynthos. Among his most important works is the "Hymn to Liberty", the first two stanzas of which are part of the national anthems of Greece and Cyprus. In 1828, he moved to Corfu to become a poet. He has been interred in the mausoleum since 1968.

Andreas Kalvos (April 1, 1792 - November 3, 1869) was born in Zakynthos (under the rule of the Venetian Republic). He published five volumes of poetry and drama.

Other prominent Zakynthians featured in the museum include:

- Antonios Matesis
- Ionias Tsakassianos
- Gregorios Xenopoulos
- Pavlos Carrer
- Machi Mouzaki
- Lula Valvi Mylonas
