= Eleni Lambiri =

Greek conductor and composer

Eleni Lambiri Ελένη Λαμπίρη
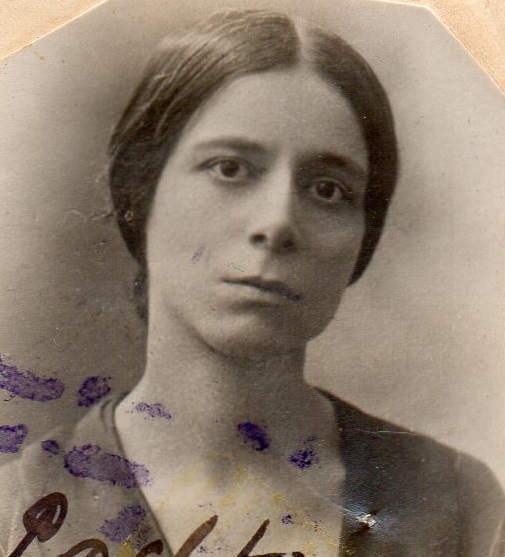
- Eleni Lambiri Greece February 1925
- Born: 9 February 1889; Athens, Greece
- Died: 30 March 1960 (aged 71); Athens, Greece
- Education: Athens Conservatory, Royal Conservatory of Leipzig
- Occupations: Composer, conductor,
- Years active: 1913–1953
- Known for: First female Greek composer
- Notable work: To apokriatiko oneiro (operetta), Isolma (operetta), Symphony for large orchestra in B minor
- Parent: Georgios Lambiris (father)

Eleni Lambiri (Greek: Ελένη Λαμπίρη, 9 February 1882 – 30 March 1960) was a Greek conductor and composer. She is often regarded as the first female Greek composer.

== Life and career ==
Eleni Lambiri was born in Athens, daughter of the composer Georgios Lambiris and granddaughter of the poet Andreas Laskaratos. She studied composition with Edoardo Sacredote at the Athens Conservatory (from 1907 to 1908). In fact she was the first woman who studied composition at the Athens Conservatory, earning her the title of the first Greek female composer. Subsequently, she studied composition with Max Reger and conducting with Hans Scheidt in the Royal Conservatory of Leipzig (from 1908 to 1911), graduating in 1911. In 1913 the operetta «To apokriatiko oneiro» (A dream in carnival), with a libretto by Gregorios Xenopoulos and music by Eleni Lambiri was performed at the Panellinion Τheatre.

After completing her studies, she worked in Milan as a conductor. On 15 January 1915 she registered the author's rights of the opereta «Isolma», at the Milan regional registry (number of registry 64794). «Isolma» was an operetta in three acts fully composed and written by Eleni Lambiri. This opereta has been recorded in 1958, by Totis Karalivanos as conductor and Spiros Kapsaskis as choir director. In about 1925 she returned to Patras, Greece, where she worked as director of the Patras Conservatory until 1953. At the same time she wrote the music criticism for the local newspaper of Patras «Neologos Patron». She died at the Municipal Hospital of Athens.

== Works ==
Selected works include:

- To apokriatiko oneiro (A Dream in Carnival) 1913, opereta
- Isolma 1915, opereta
- Ballad for soprano and piano, 1933, (now lost)
- String quartet in A major
- Serenata for flute violin and viola
- Symphony for large orchestra in B minor
- ``Iratzi N,`` opera, in libretto L.Orsini
