= James Salomoni =

Dominican priest and ascetic

Blessed Giacomo Salomoni OP
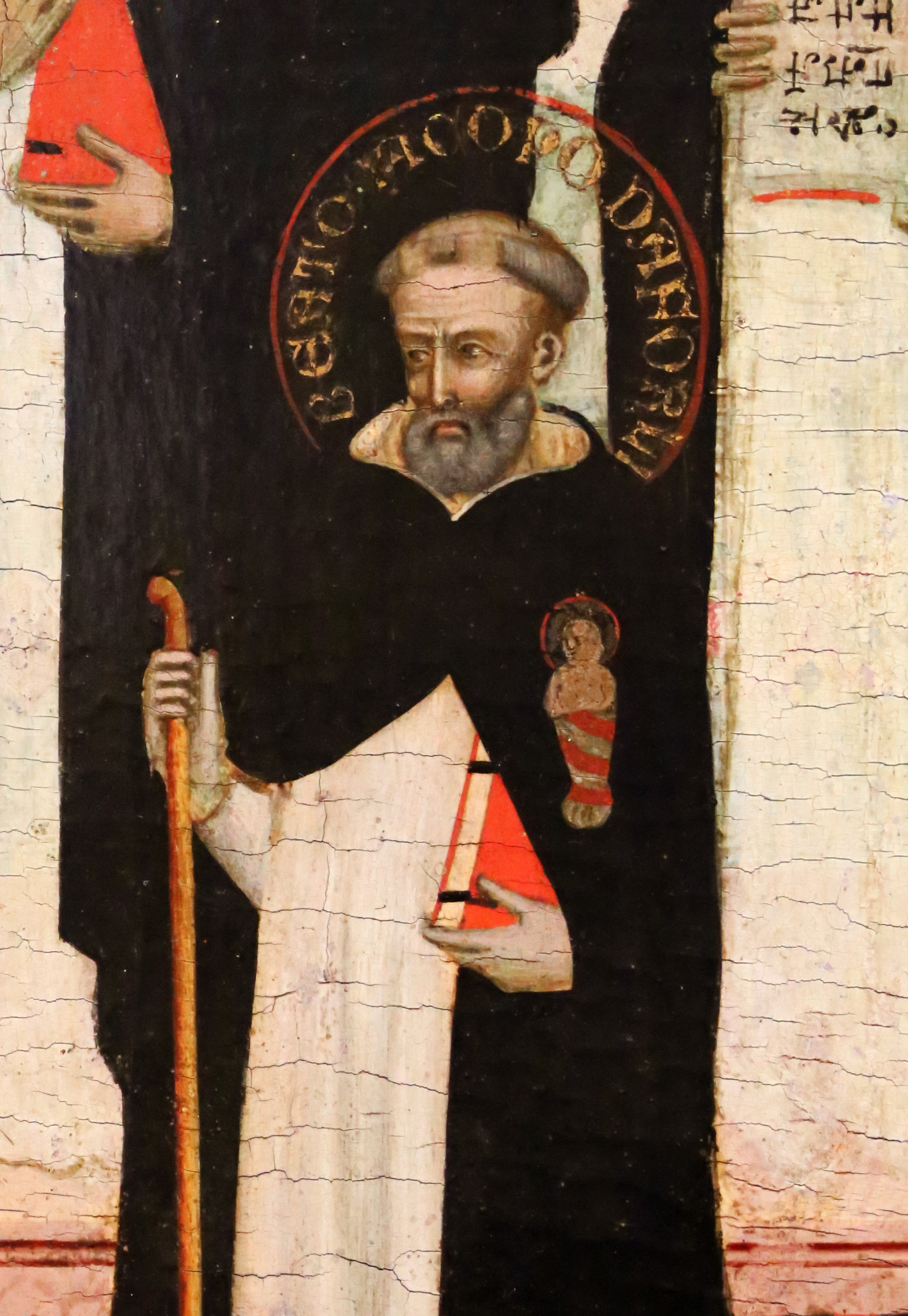

Priest
- Born: 1231; Venice, Republic of Venice
- Died: 31 May 1314 (aged 83); Forlì, Papal States
- Venerated in: Roman Catholic Church
- Beatified: 26 June 1526, Saint Peter's Basilica, Papal States by Pope Clement VII
- Major shrine: Santi Giovanni e Paolo, Venice, Italy
- Feast: 30 May
- Patronage: Forlì; Cancer patients; Against tumors

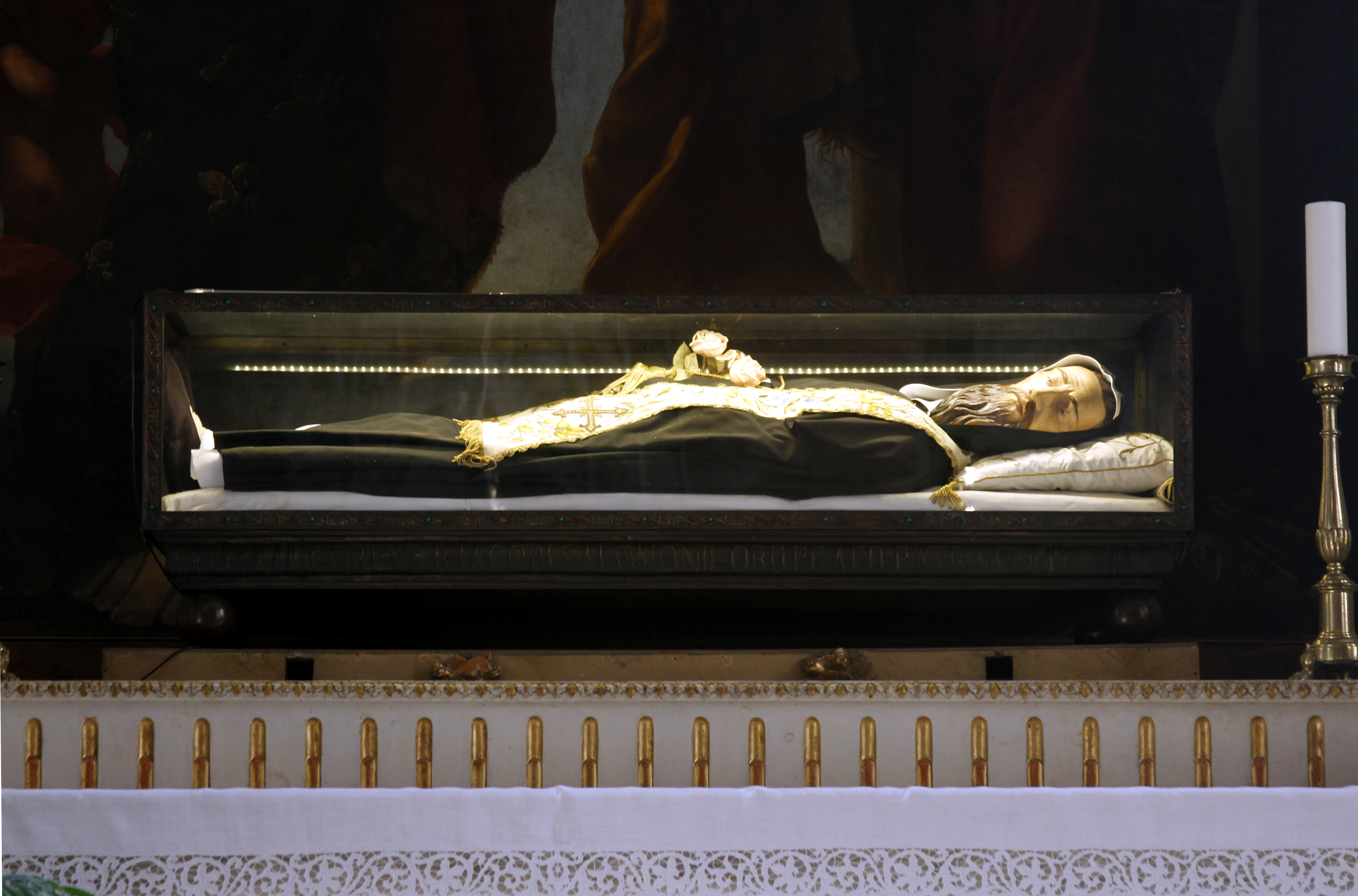
Tomb in Santi Giovanni e Paolo.

Giacomo Salomoni, OP (1231 – 31 May 1314) was an Italian Catholic priest and a professed member of the Order of Preachers. He was a noted ascetic known for being prone to ecstatic states on a frequent basis; he served as a prior of several convents until he settled in Forlì, where he remained until his death.

Salomoni's beatification was approved in mid-1526.

== Life ==
Giacomo Salomoni was born in 1231 in the Republic of Venice to the noble Salamon family, one of the oldest patrician houses of Venice; his mother raised him after his father died though his mother later became a Cistercian nun at which stage his maternal grandmother raised him.

He became a Dominican in 1248 and became the prior of houses at several places such as Faenza and San Severino as well as Ravenna. But Forlì was where he settled for the remainder of his life. He gained fame for healing as well as for his prophetic abilities obtained through an ecstatic state. From 1269 he lived at a Dominican convent in Forlì and was called the "father of the poor". He also earned fame for being the person who received the confession of Carino of Balsamo - the murderer of Peter of Verona - and became his spiritual director.

Salomoni suffered from cancer but he was cured some time before his death in 1314. He was serving in the choir when he suffered a sudden heart attack and died. Salomoni's remains were conserved in an urn at Forlì but in 1939 were translated to Venice to the basilica of Santi Giovanni e Paolo in a chapel.

== Beatification ==
In 1315 a brotherhood was founded to promote veneration for Salomoni. On 26 June 1526 he received formal beatification from Pope Clement VII upon the confirmation of his cult for Forlì. But it was not until 1568 that Pope Pius V approved that veneration for Venice; Pope Gregory XV approved his cult for the Dominicans in 1622.

A shrine was built to Salomoni at the Saint Catherine of Siena church that the Dominicans manage in Manhattan.

The oldest indult which Pope Benedict XIV quotes in this connection is that which Clement VII granted to the Dominicans of the convent of Forlì on 25 January 1526 to celebrate the Mass for the late Salomoni "as often during the year as their devotion may move them to do so" (Benedict XIV, De canonizatione de SS.).
