= The Free Besieged =

19th-century Greek epic poem

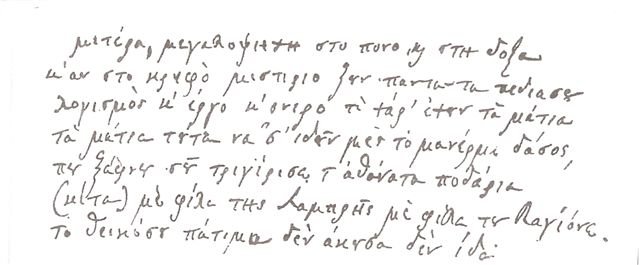
Manuscript of Dionysios Solomos from The Free Besieged.

"The Free Besieged" (Greek: Οι Ελεύθεροι Πολιορκημένοι, Oi Eleftheroi Poliorkimenoi) is an epic, unfinished work, composed by Dionysios Solomos and inspired by the third siege of Missolonghi (1825–1826), a crucial conflict of the Greek War of Independence. It is not a single work, but consists of three separate poems in fragmentary form. The Free Besieged is considered one of the greatest poems of Solomos, national poet of Greece.

== Background ==
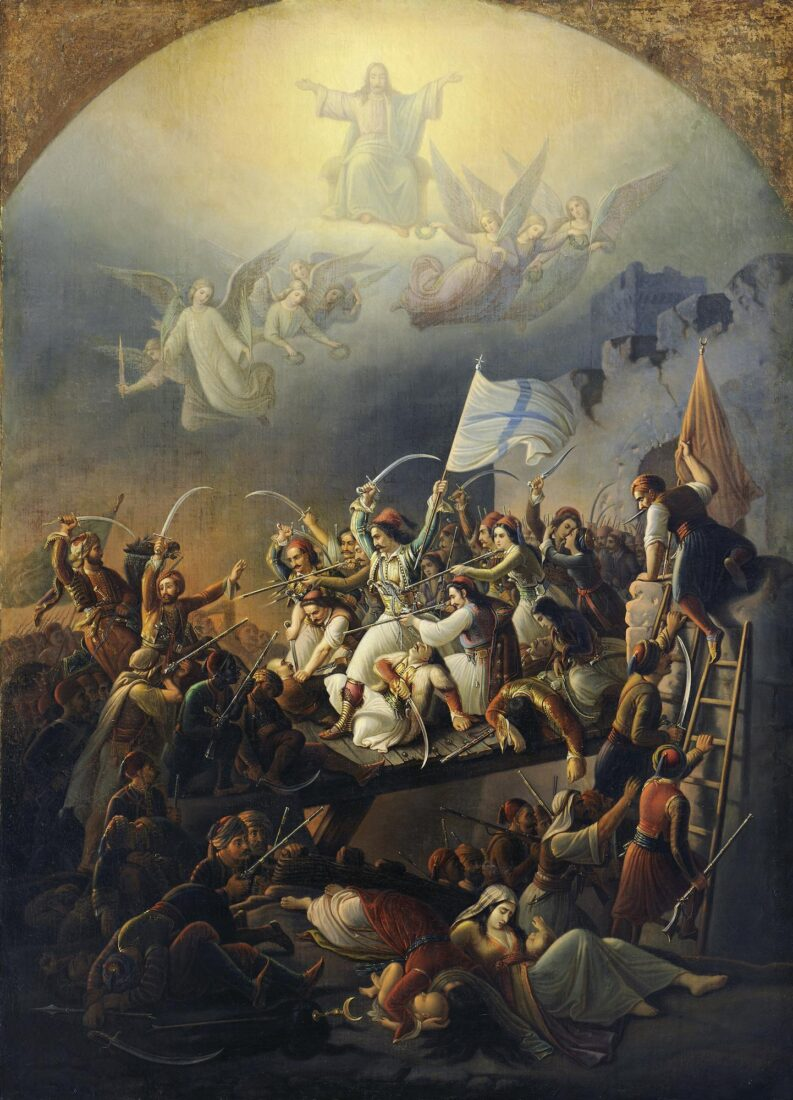
The third siege of Messolonghi, inspiration for the poet

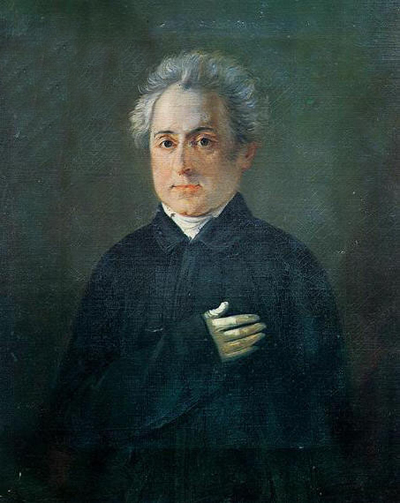
Portrait of Dionysios Solomos

On April 15, 1825, the invading Ottoman armies in Central Greece besieged the city of Missolonghi for the third time. However, the defenders managed to keep the city for almost one year, but a number of factors like the numerically superior strength of the Ottomans, the continuous assaults and the lack of food and other supplies led them to decide a heroic sortie on the night of 10 April 1826.

The siege and the subsequent sortie were one of the most stirring events of the Greek Revolution (1821–1830) and in fact the besieging forces were so overwhelming that there was no doubt about the result of the struggle. This event inspired Dionysios Solomos, the national poet of Greece, to compose The Free Besieged, which refers to the struggle of the defenders.

== Composition ==
The Free Besieged was composed in a period of more than twenty years (1828–1851). It is not a single work, but consists of three separate poems in fragmentary form. The first poem, in chronological order, is considered to be a lyric draft. Then the work is progressively advancing to a more epic form, with the second poem written in rhyming decapentasyllable and the final one a decapentasyllable without rhyme. The three fragments are linked together by short narrative passages in prose.

The Free Besieged does not have a continuous narrative, but consists of a series of scenes and glimpses that occurred during the last days of the siege, before the sortie. The central theme, according to Solomos' notes, is the defenders' power of the will, which is tested by a number of afflictions. Thus, the besieged, according to Solomos, become truly free because of their spiritual victory over all their trials. This was described by the poet as an inner freedom of the will.

== Interpretations: temptations and struggle ==
The theme of temptation is one of the most significant in the epic. Apart from the armed conflicts, the defenders have also to undergo a spiritual struggle against these that threaten to weaken their will to resistance. It is not only their physical condition of starvation and destitution, but also the far more subtle and insidious effect on them of the spell cast by nature itself: the work is set in the last days of the siege, just before the Easter of 1826, during springtime, and two of its sections are dedicated to the beauty of spring. Thus, at one time the poet describes pastoral scenes of peace which are suddenly disrupted by a bugle call, faintly blown by one of the defending soldiers, to waken and rescue their souls from 'enchantment'.

At times Solomos describes the spirit of a woman that walks through the town and encourages the defenders. On the other hand, memories of past happiness and love also provide a poignant background to their sufferings, as in a scene where a soldier recalls his last meeting with his girlfriend, who died during the siege.

According to Bruce Merry, The Free Besieged is "the greatest Greek poem never written."

== Sources ==
- Mackridge, Peter, ed. (1996). Ancient Greek myth in modern Greek poetry : essays in memory of C.A. Trypanis (1. publ. ed.). London: Frank Cass. ISBN 9780714647517.
- Merry, Bruce (2004). Encyclopedia of modern Greek literature. Greenwood Publishing Group. ISBN 978-0-313-30813-0.
- Capetanakis, Demetrios (1971). Demetrios Capetanakis; a Greek poet in England. Freeport, N.Y.: Books for Libraries Press. ISBN 9780836980554.
- Gianos, C. Th. Dimaras. Transl. by Mary P. (1972). A history of modern Greek literature ([1st ed.] ed.). Albany: State Univ. of New York Press. ISBN 9780873950718.
