= Andreas Kalvos =

Greek poet

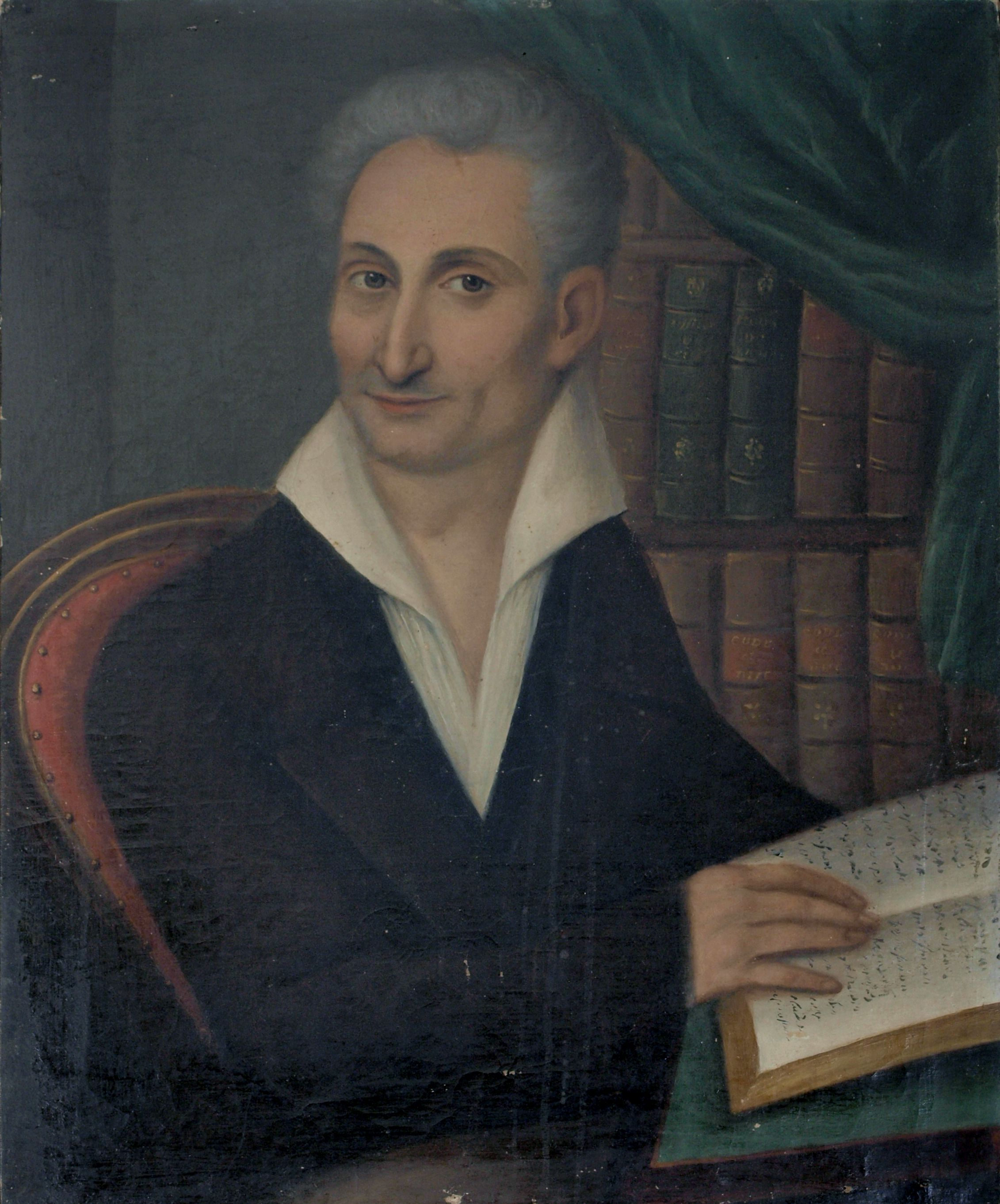
Portrait of the poet Andreas Kalvos

Andreas Kalvos (also Calvos, /ˈkɑːlvɒs/ KAHL-voss; Greek: Ἀνδρέας Κάλβος [anˈðreas ˈkalvos]; Italian: Andrea Calbo; 1 April 1792 – 3 November 1869) was a Greek poet of the Romantic school.

He published five volumes of poetry and drama: Canzone... (1811), Le Danaidi (1818), Elpis patridos (1818), Lyra (1824) and New odes (1826). He was a contemporary of the poets Ugo Foscolo and Dionysios Solomos. He was among the representatives of the Heptanese School of literature.

He is featured prominently in the Museum of Solomos and Eminent Zakynthians.

== Biography ==
Andreas Kalvos was born in April 1792 on the island of Zacynthos, then ruled by the Venetian Republic, the elder of the two sons of Ioannes Kalvos and Andriane Kalvos (née Roucane). His mother came from an established, landowning Venetian family. His younger brother, Nicolaos, was born in 1794. In 1802, when Andreas was ten years old, his father took him and Nicolaos, but not his wife, to Livorno in Italy, where his brother was consul for the Ionian Islands and where there was a Greek community. The two boys never saw their mother again. In 1805 Kalvos's mother obtained a divorce on the grounds of desertion; and shortly afterwards remarried. In Livorno, Andreas first studied ancient Greek and Latin literature and history.

In Livorno, in 1811 he wrote his Italian Hymn to Napoleon, an anti-war poem that he later repudiated (this is how we know of its existence, as the poem itself was not saved). Around the same time he lived for a few months in Pisa, where he worked as a secretary; and then moved to Florence, a centre of intellectual and artistic life of the time.

In 1812 his father died, and Kalvos's finances became deeply strained. However, during that year he also met Ugo Foscolo, the most honoured Italian poet and scholar of the era, and, like Calvos, a native of Zacynthos. Foscolo gave Calvos a post as his copyist, and put him to teaching a protégé of his. Under the influence of Foscolo Kalvos took up neoclassicism, archaizing ideals, and political liberalism. In 1813 Kalvos wrote three tragedies in Italian: Theramenes, Danaïdes and Hippias. He also completed four dramatic monologues, in the neoclassical style.

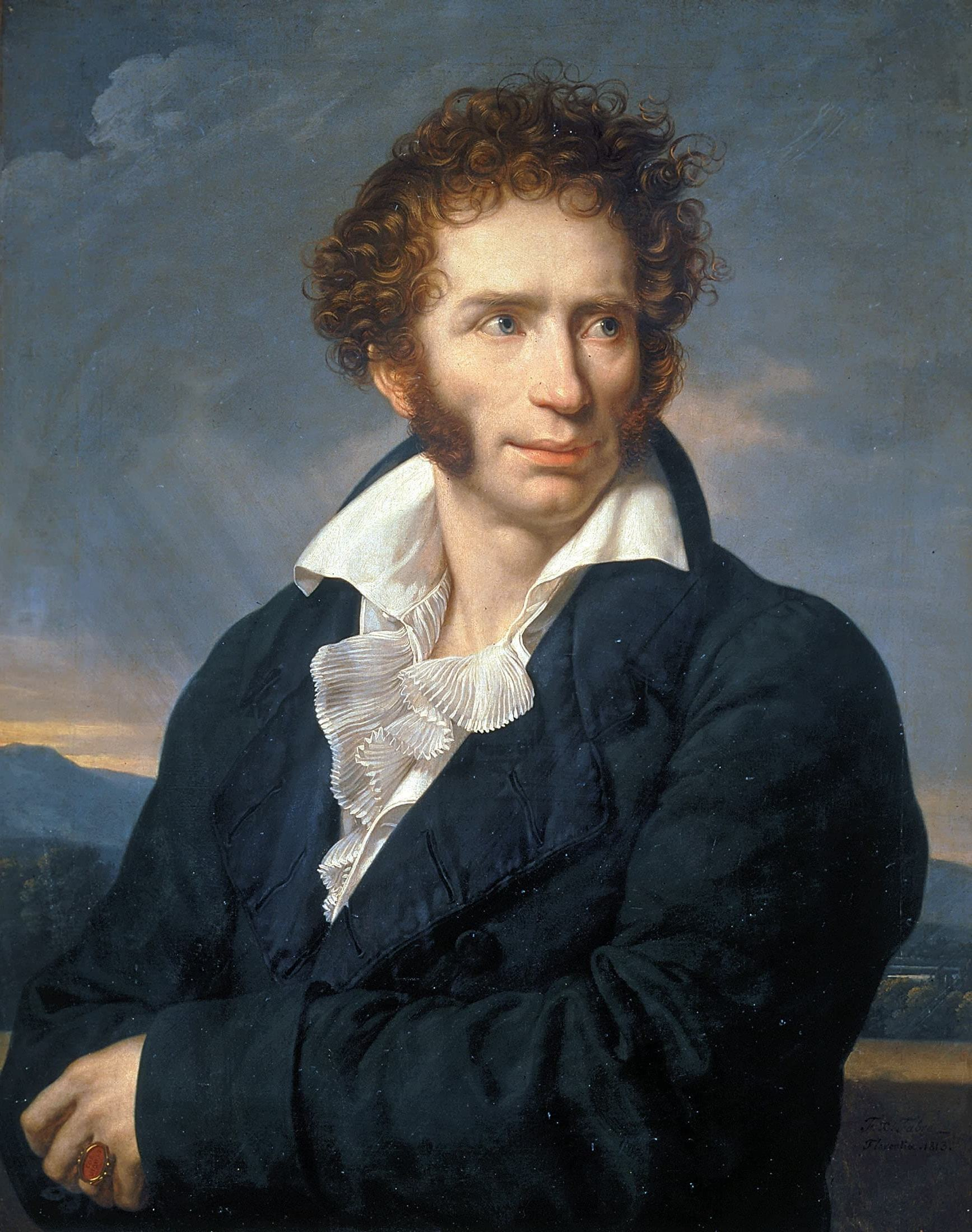
Ugo Foscolo

At the end of 1813, because of his 'advanced' views, Foscolo withdrew to Zürich in Switzerland. Kalvos remained in Florence, where he again became a teacher. In 1814 he wrote another Italian ode, 'To the Ionians', expressing his sympathy with the plight of his fellow-countrymen, and at this period made a close study of the works of Rousseau. He also, it seems, embarked on a love affair with a woman.

In 1816 Calvos broke off his affair and went to join Foscolo in Switzerland. That year he also learned that his mother had died a year before, a thing that saddened him deeply, as can be seen in his Ode to Death.

By the end of 1816 the two poets travelled together to Britain, and continued their association in London until February 1817, when for an unknown reason they quarrelled and separated. Foscolo later said that Calvos had exploited him, but it is possible that the younger poet had begun to find Foscolo's patronage irksome. Kalvos earned a living by giving Italian and Greek lessons, and translating the Anglican liturgy into Italian and Greek. In 1818 and 1819 he gave lectures on the pronunciation of ancient Greek. He composed and published a modern Greek grammar, 'Italian Lessons, in four parts' and dealt with the syntax of an English-Greek dictionary.

After several love affairs, he married Maria Theresa Thomas, with whom he had one daughter; but his wife died on 17 May 1819 and his daughter shortly afterwards. By the end of 1819 Calvos had a love affair with a student, Susan Fortune Rideout, but her parents did not approve, and it was considered too soon after his wife's death for them to think of marrying. During that time he may have attempted to commit suicide.

At the beginning of 1820 Calvos left Britain. In September 1820, while returning to Florence, he stopped a short while in Paris.

in Florence he became involved in the movement of the Carbonari, and was arrested and expelled on 23 April 1821. He retreated to Geneva, finding support in the philhellene circle of the city. He worked again as a teacher of foreign languages, while publishing of a manuscript of the Iliad, that however was not successful. Carried away in the enthusiasm of the outbreak of the Greek War of Independence he composed several poems in Greek, and in 1824 published Lyra, a collection of ten Greek odes. Almost immediately the odes were translated into French, and found a favourable reception.

At the beginning of 1825 Kalvos returned to Paris, where in 1826 he published ten more Greek odes, Lyrica, with the financial aid of philhellenes.

In the end of July 1826 Calvos decided to travel to Greece himself, and, as he said in the dedication to his 1826 odes, to expose his heart to Musulman fire. He landed at Nauplion; but was soon disappointed by the rivalries and hatreds of the Greeks and their indifference to himself and his work. In August the same year he withdrew to Cercyra (Corfu).

There he taught in the Ionian Academy (Ionios Akademia) as a private tutor, until he was appointed to the academy in 1836. He was director of the Corfiot Gymnasium (Kerkyraiko Gymnasio) during 1841, but resigned by the end of the year. He also contributed to local newspapers. For many years he and the poet Dionysios Solomos were both living on Corfu, but the two do not appear to have known each other. This is probably due to his wayward character. The fact he was not recognized in his homeland is perhaps also owed to that. After 1826, Calvos published no more poetry.

In the end of 1852 Kalvos left Corfu, and returned to Britain. On 5 February 1853 he married Charlotte Augusta Wadams, a woman twenty years younger than he. They settled at Louth, Lincolnshire, where they ran a school for girls.

Kalvos died on 3 November 1869 in Louth. His widow died in 1888. They were buried in the graveyard of St Margaret's church, Keddington, near Louth.

In June 1960 the poet George Seferis, who at that time was Greek ambassador to Britain, arranged for Calvos's remains to be transferred to Zacynthos, where they rest in the church of St Nicolas.

== Portraiture ==
Andreas Kalvos is considered as one of the most important poets of the Greek War of Independence, whose forgotten work was discovered by the poet Kostis Palamas in 1888. Ever since, no sketch, portrait, or photograph of him was traced, fact that created legends around his real face and character. During the 20th century, Nobel awarded poets Giorgos Seferis and Odysseas Elytis, and many others poets, artists and painters created countless imaginary portraits of Kalvos, painted according to the judgment or inspiration of each one. In 2002, Spyros Asdrachas discovered and published Kalvo's original passport (issued on June 24, 1826, by the British Consulate in Marseilles) making his face characteristics known, after almost two centuries.

In March 2025, Professor George Andriomenos (University of the Peloponnese, Dept. of Philology), announced the discovery of an antique portrait of a man, whose characteristics are identical to those of Kalvos' passport. Besides that, the canvas bears an inscription in Italian on its back (effigie del Sigr. And. Calvo), element that helped to the identification of the sitter. The authenticity of the portrait and the inscription has been confirmed through scientific analysis by the Prof. Anastasios Koutsouris (University of West Attica, Dpt. of Conservation), giving an end to the search of Kalvo's image.

== Works ==
- Ελπίς Πατρίδος (Hope of Homeland)
- Λύρα -- ᾨδαὶ Ἀνδρέα Κάλβου ['Lyre – Odes of Andreas Calvos'] (1824 Geneva) (text at Greek Wikisource)
- Λυρικά [= 'Lyrics'] (1826)
- Hippias
- Le Danaidi (1818)
- Theramenes (1813)
- The Seasons (Le Stagioni -- Giovanni Meli)
- Italian Lessons in Four Parts (1820)
- ᾨδὴ είς Ἰονίους Ode agli Ionii [= 'Ode to the Ionians'] (1814)
- Σχέδιο Νέων Ἀρχῶν τῶν Γραμμάτων [= 'A Plan of New Principles of Letters']
- Ἀπολογία τῆς Αὐτοκτονίας [= 'A Defence of Suicide']
- Έρευνα περὶ τῆς Φύσεως τοῦ Διαφορικοῦ Ὑπολογισμοῦ [= 'Introduction to Differential Calculus'] (1827)
- Ugo Foscolo, Grazie [publication of unpublished abstracts] (1846)
- Canzone (1811)
- Βιβλίον τῶν Δημοσίων Προσευχῶν [= 'Book of Common Prayer'] (1820)
- Γραμματικὴ τῆς Νέας Ἑλληνικῆς Γλώσσης [= 'Grammar of the modern Grek language'] (1822)
- Ἐπίκρισις Θεολογική [= 'Theological Criticism'] (1849)
