= Idou o anthropos =

1886 book by Andreas Laskaratos

Idou o anthropos (Greek: Ἰδοὺ ὁ ἄνθρωπος; Ecce homo or Behold the Man), written in 1886, is a work by the poet and writer Andreas Laskaratos. The main theme of the book is human characters and through a series of examples it tries to acquaint the reader with the different attributes of the human psyche in its different manifestations.

The multitude of different characters portrayed in the book is an early attempt to categorize people according to their personality traits.

Idou anthropos (Greek: Ἰδοὺ ἄνθρωπος) is also the words ironically uttered by Pilate, when condemning Jesus, Jesus being in the epitomal state of God becoming Man.
