= Salamon family =

Noble family of Venice

Salamon Salomon, Salomoni
- patrician family
- Coat of Arms of the House of Salamon
- Country: Republic of Venice; Italy
- Titles: Patricians of Venice
- Style: N.H. / N.D.

The Salamon family (sometimes Salomon or Salomoni) was a patrician Venetian noble family of ancient but uncertain origin, counted among the so-called “Case Vecchie” (Old Houses) of the Republic of Venice.

== History ==
According to some sources, they would derive from the aristocratic Centranico-Barbolano family, and they moved from Salerno or Cesena before living in Torcello and finally in Venice. The first to assume this surname was perhaps the Doge Pietro Barbolano (11th century). A branch of the family, engaged in trade, later settled in Heraklion.

The Salamons were admitted to the patriciate of Venice since the "Serrata del Maggior Consiglio" (Great Council Lockout) in 1297. Since the 15th century they appear as one of the 24 "Case Vecchie" of the city (i.e. the most ancient houses of the patriciate), whose members were called "Longhi", in place of the Ziani family extinct in the 14th century.

The Salamon family founded the church and the female monastery of Santa Marta in Venice: the oldest of the family, as head of the house, had the privilege of installing the new elected abbess, and every year, on the day of the titular saint, she gave a rose to the family.

One of the most important members of the family was fr. Jacopo Salamon (1231–1314), a Dominican friar, who was beatified by the Catholic Church. Numerous members of the family – particularly in the 16th century – held the position of "podestà" (i.e. mayor), on behalf of the Serenissima, in some cities under Venetian rule, including Treviso, Vicenza, Bergamo, Crema, Pola, Parenzo and Capodistria.

The variants "Salomon" and "Salomoni", that sometimes appear in documents, are probably normalizations or adaptations of the original form "Salamon".

The coat of arms of the Salamon family – lozengy/fusilly silver and red – is still visible on the facade of the Salamon Palace (15th century) in Cannaregio, Venice.

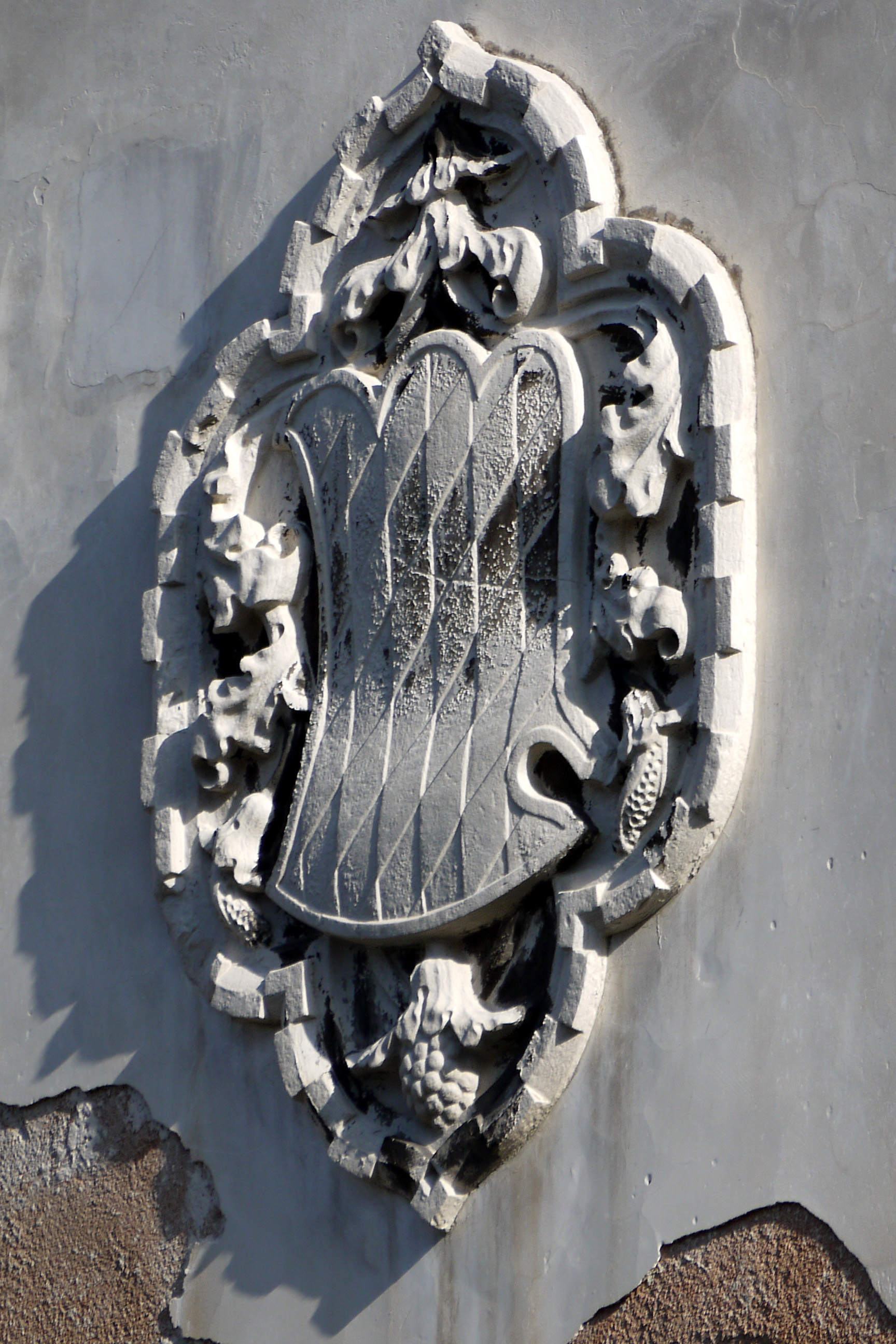
Coat of Arms of Salamon Family – Venice, Salamon Palace

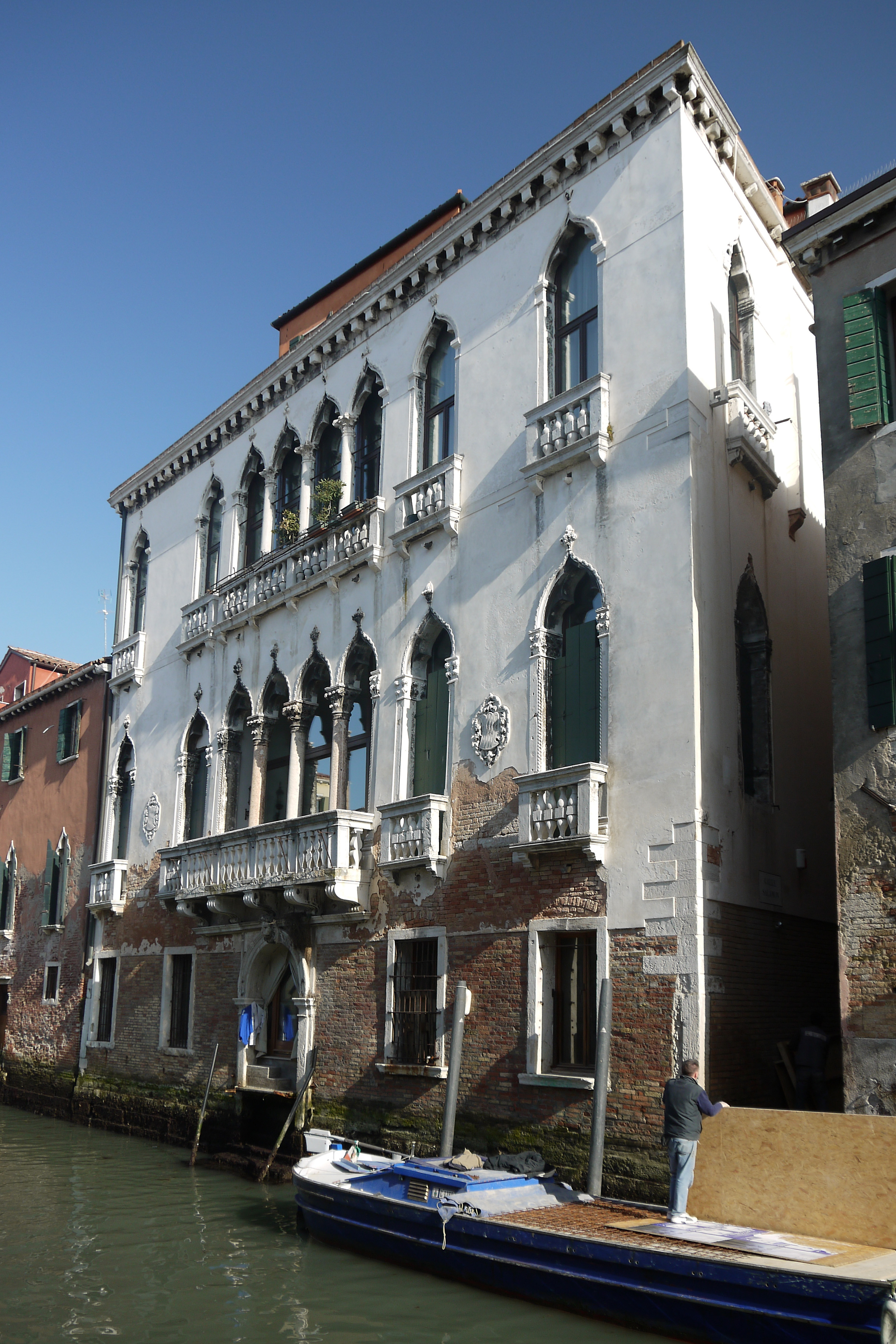
Salamon Palace – Venice, Cannaregio

== Palaces ==
- Salamon Palace, in Cannaregio, Venice.
- Salamon Palace, in Gračišće, Istria.
- Salamon Palace, in Gorgo al Monticano, Treviso.

== Notable members ==
- Pietro Centranico Barbolano (11th century), 28th Doge of the Republic of Venice.
- Vitale Salamon (12th century), underwriter of the construction of the St Mark's Campanile.
- James Salomoni (13th century), Dominican friar, then beatified by the Catholic Church.
- Zaccaria Salamon (16th century), Venetian politician, rector of Kotor.
- Nicolò Salamon (16th century), Venetian governor in Istria.
- Giovanni Salamon (17th century), senator and governor of the Republic of Venice.
- Michiel Angelo Salamon (17th century), doctor of the Republic of Venice.
- Caterina Dolfin (18th century), Venetian poet, daughter of N.D. Donata Salamon and descendant of the noble Dolfin family.
- Pier Luigi Bembo Salamon (19th century), senator of the Kingdom of Italy and mayor of Venice, descendant of the noble Bembo family.
