= Battle of Mouzaki =

1878 battle of the Thessalian Revolt

Coordinates: 39.4278036°N 21.6449528°E

- Part of the Thessalian Revolt of 1878
Date	4 May 1878
Location	Mouzaki, Sanjak of Tirhala, Ottoman Empire (Now Greece)
Result	Greek victory

Belligerents
Greece	Ottoman Empire

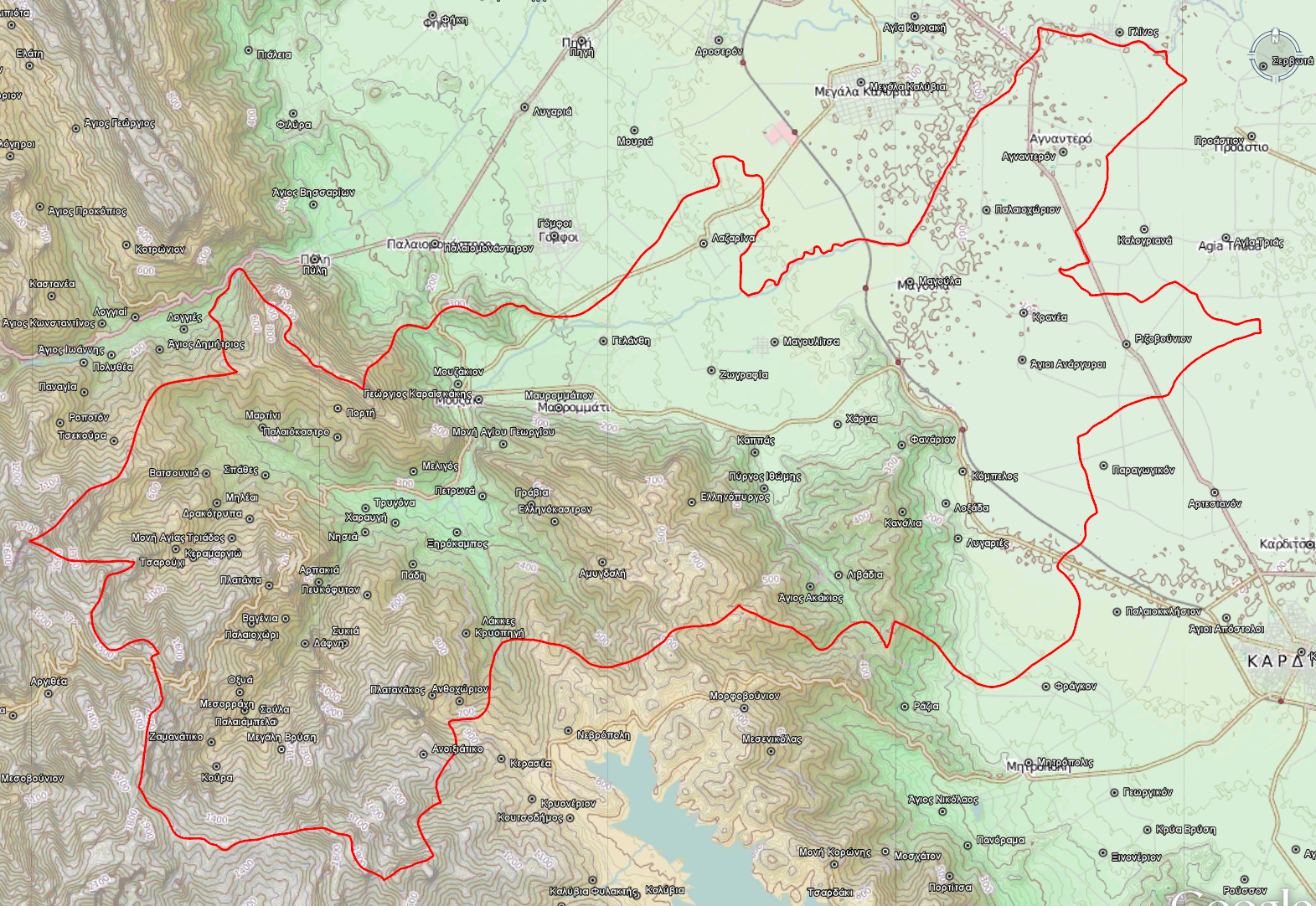
Topographic map of the Municipality of Mouzaki

The Battle of Mouzaki (Greek: Mάχη του Μουζακίου) occurred on 4 May 1878 between Greek irregulars with the cover support of the Greek Army against the Ottoman Army.

It is one of the main events of the Greek revolts that erupted in Thessaly and Epirus during the Russo-Turkish War of 1877–1878.

== Background ==
The creation of the independent Greek state spread irredentism to other, Ottoman areas with Greek inhabitants such as Thessaly, Epirus and Macedonia.

In Western Thessaly, agitations had started without the official involvement of the Hellenic Army, but a committee of Greek Officers had been secretly sent so as to coordinate with local guerrilla bands the harassment of Ottoman troops.

The headquarters was installed in Loutro Karditsas, under the overall command of Artillery Colonel Konstantinos Ischonomachos, aided by Captains Georgios Filaretos and Ioannis Igglesis.

== Events ==
Guerrilla warfare was already endemic in the area against Turks and Albanians. By the beginning of March 1878, the local chieftain Thanassis Ziakas and his band of Agraphiote brigands had revolted in the villages of Vounista, Granista and Mesenikola.

Stylianos Tzavaras, a senior sergeant in the Greek Army, also formed a compact force with Sarakatsan and Vlach klephts, many of them members of the infamous Arvanitakis gang.

Both groups gathered together and directed an attack on the village of Mouzaki, which was a strategic point in the region, key to obtaining food and water. In addition, it was the opportunity to draw Ottoman troops from the large cities into the countryside.

== Battle ==
The news about these events, and the fact that there was a considerable population of Turkish landlords and Muslim Albanians in danger soon reached Trikala, where the authorities sent a detachment of troops under Moussa Gkeka so as to recover the village and suppress the rebellion.

For the Greeks, it was a vital opportunity to defeat a major enemy, therefore troops from the regular Greek Army were deployed in order to support the irregulars. The Ottoman troops seemed not to expect to face any other forces than a gang of klephts as they have been used to do for years, so their strength was reduced to light cavalry and infantry troops.

As a result, the Ottomans were taken by surprise and completely defeated by much stronger and better-equipped Greek troops under Lieutenants Georgios Alexandris and Takis Stournaris on 4 May 1878. The Turks suffered heavy losses, and Gkeka himself was taken prisoner.

== Aftermath ==
The minor victory at Mouzaki was a morale boost for the rebels, but it did not change reality on the ground: the Ottomans soon stamped out the rebellion, while Greece was pressured by the Great Powers to remove support of the rebels. In the end however, Thessaly would be incorporated into the Greek kingdom in 1881.
