= Georgios Tertsetis =

Greek politician and scholar

- Γεώργιος Τερτσέτης
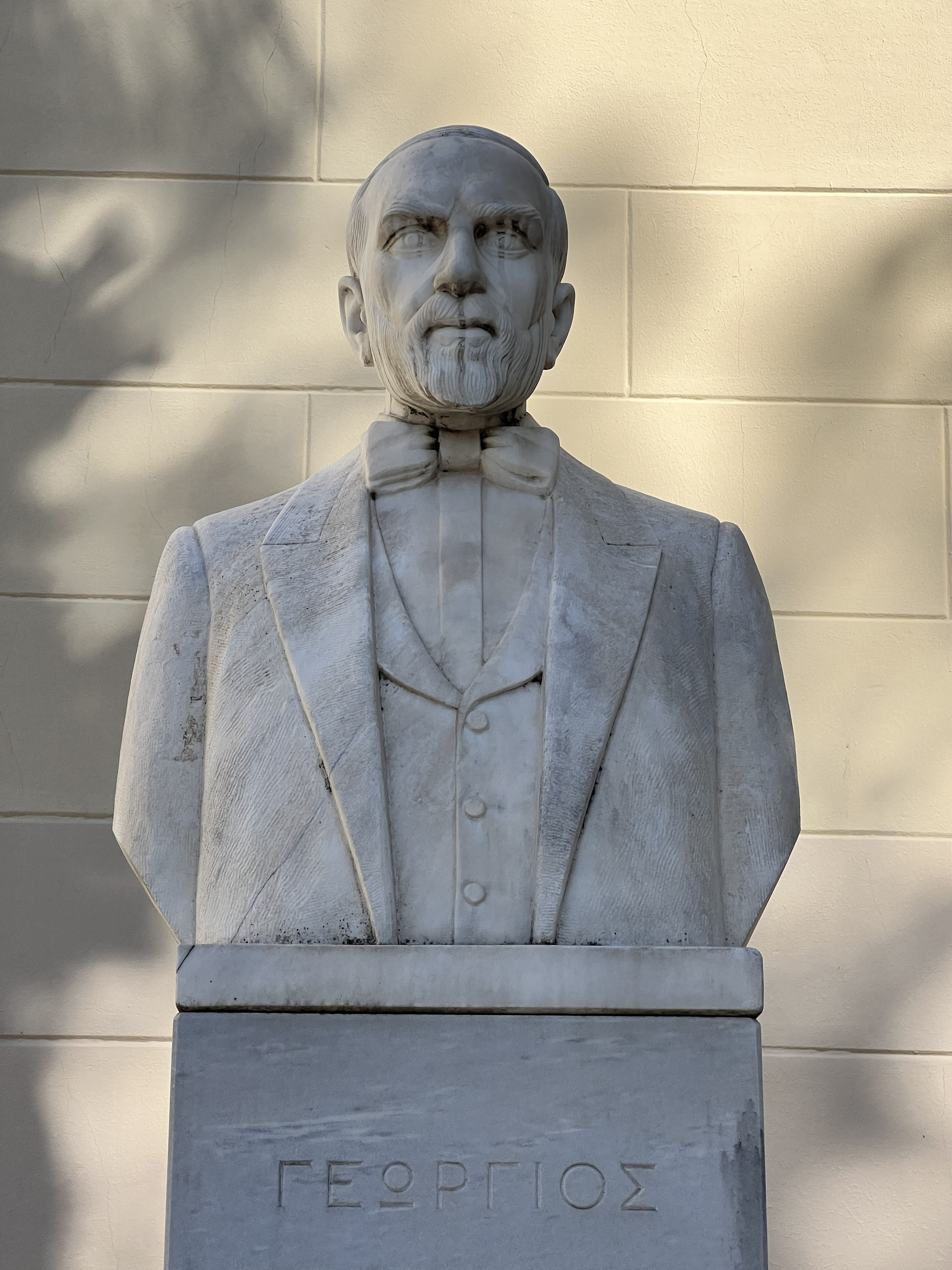
- Bust of Tertsetis in Nafplio
- Born: 1800; Zakynthos
- Died: 1874 (aged 73–74)
- Monuments: The Courthouse of Tripoli, in the Square of Ares
- Education: University of Padua (1816–1820)
- Occupation: Judge
- Known for: He is best known, along with Anastasios Polyzoidis, for his refusal to agree to the condemnation and execution of Theodoros Kolokotronis and Dimitrios Plapoutas, in 1834

Georgios Tertsetis (Greek: Γεώργιος Τερτσέτης; 1800, Zakynthos – 15 April 1874, Athens) was a Greek independence fighter, historian, politician, poet, writer, judge and philosopher. He is best known, along with Anastasios Polyzoidis, for his refusal to agree to the condemnation and execution of Theodoros Kolokotronis and Dimitrios Plapoutas, in 1834.

== Biography ==
Tertsetis was born in Zakynthos but studied law at the University of Padua. Soon he became interested in Italian literature and the European Enlightenment. When the Greek Revolution broke out in 1821, Tertsetis returned to Zakynthos, fired up with patriotic fever, and took part in some battles in Peloponnese. As he was under great financial difficulties, he worked as a tutor to the Botsaris family in Patras. He was able to find some work in Nafplion where he was given the post of History Professor at the Military Academy.

In 1833, Tertsetis was appointed a magistrate. He is mostly known in Greece as one of the two judges who refused to succumb to government pressure and condemn Theodoros Kolokotronis to death in 1834, a brave act that put him to exile, though. The passion of Georgios Tertsetis was literature. He wrote many verses and in 1833, he published a poem dedicated to King Otto, entitled The Kiss, a poem inspired by the folklore language of the common people. However, his poetry didn't have much popularity and remains unknown. It was his prose that was much appreciated. The most famous work of Tertsetis was The Memoirs of Kolokotronis, a narrative biography of the great hero of the Greek Revolution. Georgios Tertsetis died in Athens in 1874.

== Sources ==
- Roderick Beaton, David Ricks, The making of modern Greece: nationalism, Romanticism, & the uses of the past (1797-1896), Ashgate Publishing, Ltd., 2009, p. 117.
- "Information About The Courthouse of Tripoli". Archived from the original on December 22, 2015.
- "Great Personalities from Greek Islands".
