= Parnassos Literary Society =

Literary society in Greece

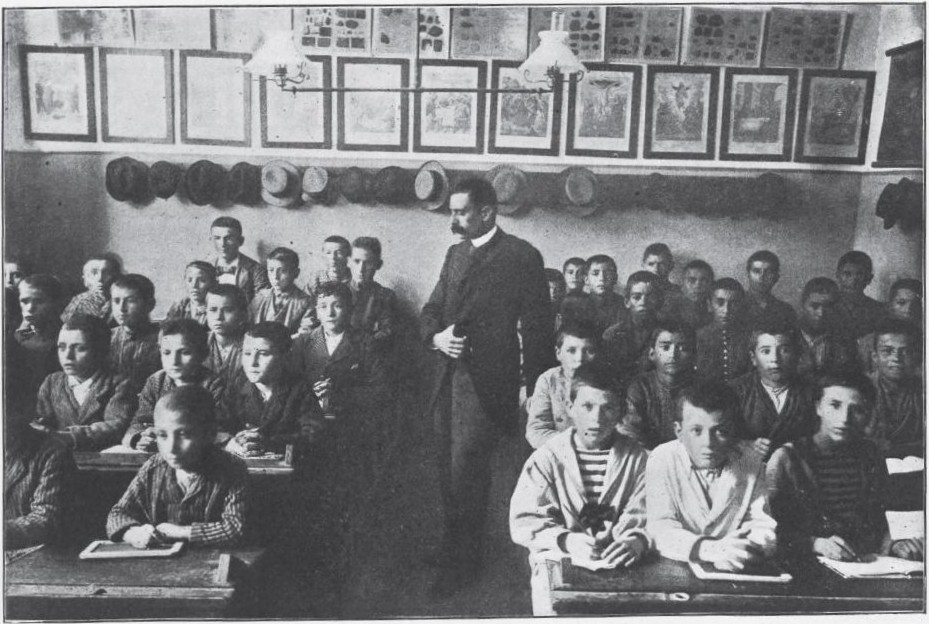
The society's school for the poor in 1896

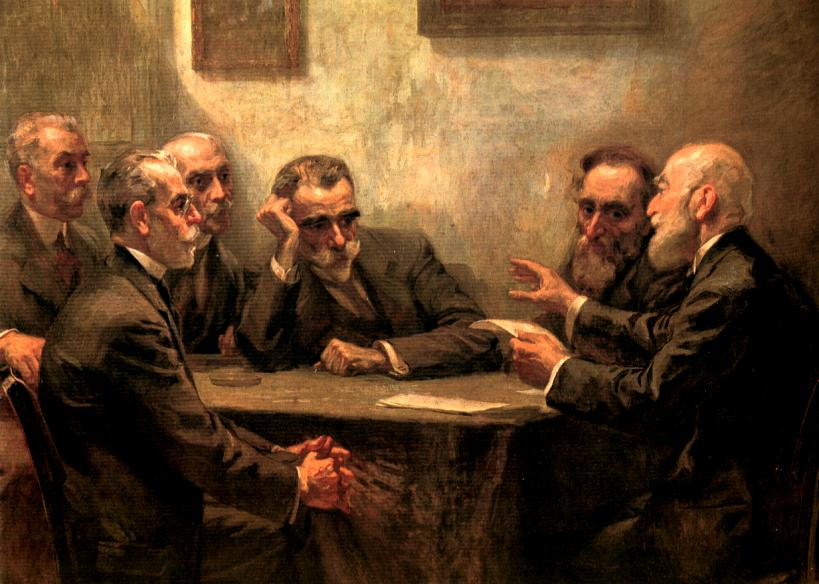
Parnassos Literary Society. From left: Georgios Stratigis, Georgios Drossinis, Ioannis Polemis, Palamas at the center, Georgios Souris and Aristomenis Provelengios, poets of the New Athenian School (or Palamian School). Paninting by Georgios Roilos

The Parnassos Literary Society (Greek: Φιλολογικός Σύλλογος Παρνασσός) was founded in 1865 in Athens and has published various magazines. The oldest literary society in mainland Greece, it continues to be active today.

The Society was founded on 24 June 1865 by the four children of the numismatist Pavlos Lambros to contribute to the spiritual, social, and moral improvement of the Greek people through its events. Its first president was Michael Lambros. The club quickly became well-known, and functioned as a sort of Academy with literary, archaeological, legal, artistic and even scientific sections. It organized lectures, exhibitions, and various competitions. In 1872, at the suggestion of S. Vassiliadis, it opened a night school for destitute children. The historian Constantine Paparrigopoulos became honorary chairman.

It was officially recognized as a nonprofit organization by the Greek state on March 17, 1875.

The club is now housed in a private mansion on the St. George Square designed by Ifikratis Kokkidis (Ιφικράτης Κοκκίδης). The club has a valuable library and art gallery with 250 works by Greek artists.

== Publications ==
From 1877–1895, the club published the magazine Parnassos (Παρνασσός).

From 1896–1939, it published Epeteris (Επετηρίς, "Yearbook").

From 1959 to the present, the club has published a second series of Parnassos quarterly.

== Notable members ==
- Simos Menardos
- John Pentland Mahaffy

== Bibliography ==
- Savaidou, Irini Mergoupi (2010). 'Δημόσιος Λόγος περί Επιστήμης στην Ελλάδα, 1870–1900: Εκλαϊκευτικά Εγχειρήματα στο Πανεπιστήμιο Αθηνών, στους Πολιτιστικούς Συλλόγους και στα Περιοδικά [Public Discourse about Science in Greece, 1870-1900: Population Projects at the University of Athens, in Cultural Associations and Magazines] (PDF). Athens, GR: Department of History and Philosophy of Science of the University of Athens.
