= Drossinis Museum =

Museum in Kifisia, Athens, Greece

Coordinates: 38.0712°N 23.8119°E

The Drossinis Museum
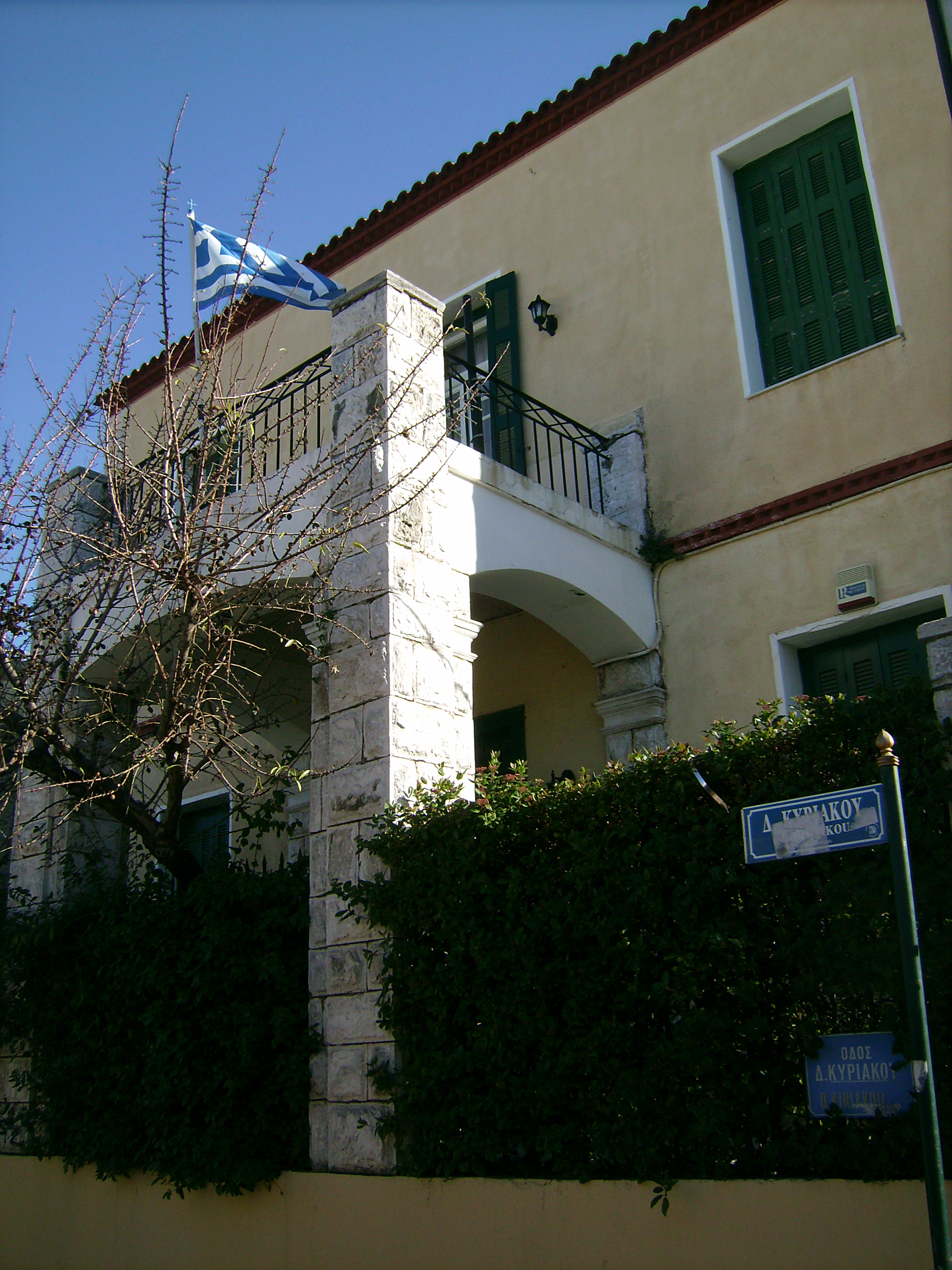
- Established: 1997
- Location: Agion Theodoron & D. Kyriakou St., Kifisia, Athens, Greece
- Public transit access: Kifissia
- Website: Official site

Drossinis Museum is in the center of Kifisia, a northern suburb of Athens, and it is housed in “Amaryllis” villa, where Georgios Drossinis lived in his last years and which is named after a central character of one of his earliest and most popular works. The museum was founded in 1997 with the aim to preserve and promote Drossinis’ (1859-1951) multidimensional work. Drossinis, along with Costis Palamas and Nikos Kampas co-founded the New Athenian School, the Greek literary ‘1880s Generation’, a movement which renewed Greek literature and fought for the establishment of modern Greek language ("Demotic") The museum includes three halls, which are on the first floor, while the ground floor houses the Municipal Library of Kifisia, according to Drossinis's wish.

== The museum ==
Going upstairs, the first hall on the right is the "Intellectual" Hall. Here lies Drossinis's intellectual treasure. Numerous exhibits demonstrate his significant presence in letters and his important contribution to education in Greece. Here one can find archived all issues of Estia newspaper, of which Drossinis was editor-in-chief and director and which circulated daily since 1894 and had a determining role in Greek life. In the same hall, the visitor can see a sample of Drossinis's work as a publisher: Asty, To Imerologion Tis Megalis Elladas ("Journal of Great Greece"), Nea Hellas (“New Greece”), Ethnike Agoge (“National Education”) are some of the magazines and journals published by Drossinis, which aimed towards the intellectual rebirth of Greek people. In addition, there is a great number of books exhibited here which were either edited by Drossinis or published by the "Society for the Propagation of Beneficial Books" (Σ.Ω.Β.), of which Drossinis was a co-founder (along with Demetrios Vikelas) and a lifelong secretary. The poet's collaborations in Greek publications (Athinai, O Noumas, Scrip, Romios) or foreign ones – Cypriot, French, German and American – can also be found in this hall. Manuscripts, correspondence with Greek and foreign intellectual people, a collection of newspapers with articles about Drossinis and personal belongings, all complete the poet's intellectual personality.

The hall on the left is the "Emotional" Hall. It is Drossinis’ bedroom, where the visitor has the feeling that the poet is constantly present. Photos of Mesolonghi, Drossinis's birthplace, on the walls and others of his friends and relatives, all complete the picture of the poet amongst his close ones. Fishing and hunting equipment reveal his great love of nature – Drossinis also wrote books about fishing and hunting – while religious icons express his deep faith. Children's reading books from all around the world – as he himself was an author of school reading books – show his care for education, to which he offered a lot from his high position in the Greek Ministry of Education. These objects, together with sculptures by Tombros and Vitsaris, surround the poet's figure as portrayed by the sculptor Angeliki Vlachopoulou sitting in his armchair at old age.

The third hall is the ‘Folk’ Hall. It is the largest part of the museum and the most interesting one, especially for the younger visitors. The heroes of his writings and his life are here: clay figures in real-life size – most works are by A. Vlachopoulou – represent vividly the world of his prose. Idyllic, interested in folk tradition, rich in emotions, full of sensitive female characters: Amaryllis and Ersie – the heroines of his homonymous works – Morfoula – a tenant farmer's daughter in his family farm in Evia – whom he first met very young and for whom he composed his favourite poem, To Moiroloi tis Omorfis (“The Beauty’s Lament”), and his cousin Drosina, who inspired his most popular poem, which was immediately set to music and is still sung today, Anthismeni Amygdalia (“Blooming Almond Tree”). Athanasios Diakos (the Greek Independence fighter) represents Drossinis's patriotic ideals, a grandfather sitting in the center of the hall, surrounded by his grandchildren listening to him reading fairy tales, shows his love for children – he himself also wrote fairy tales with educational content – while the small sofa on which he used to sit with Kate Manou, his last muse, signifies his passion for life until his latest years.

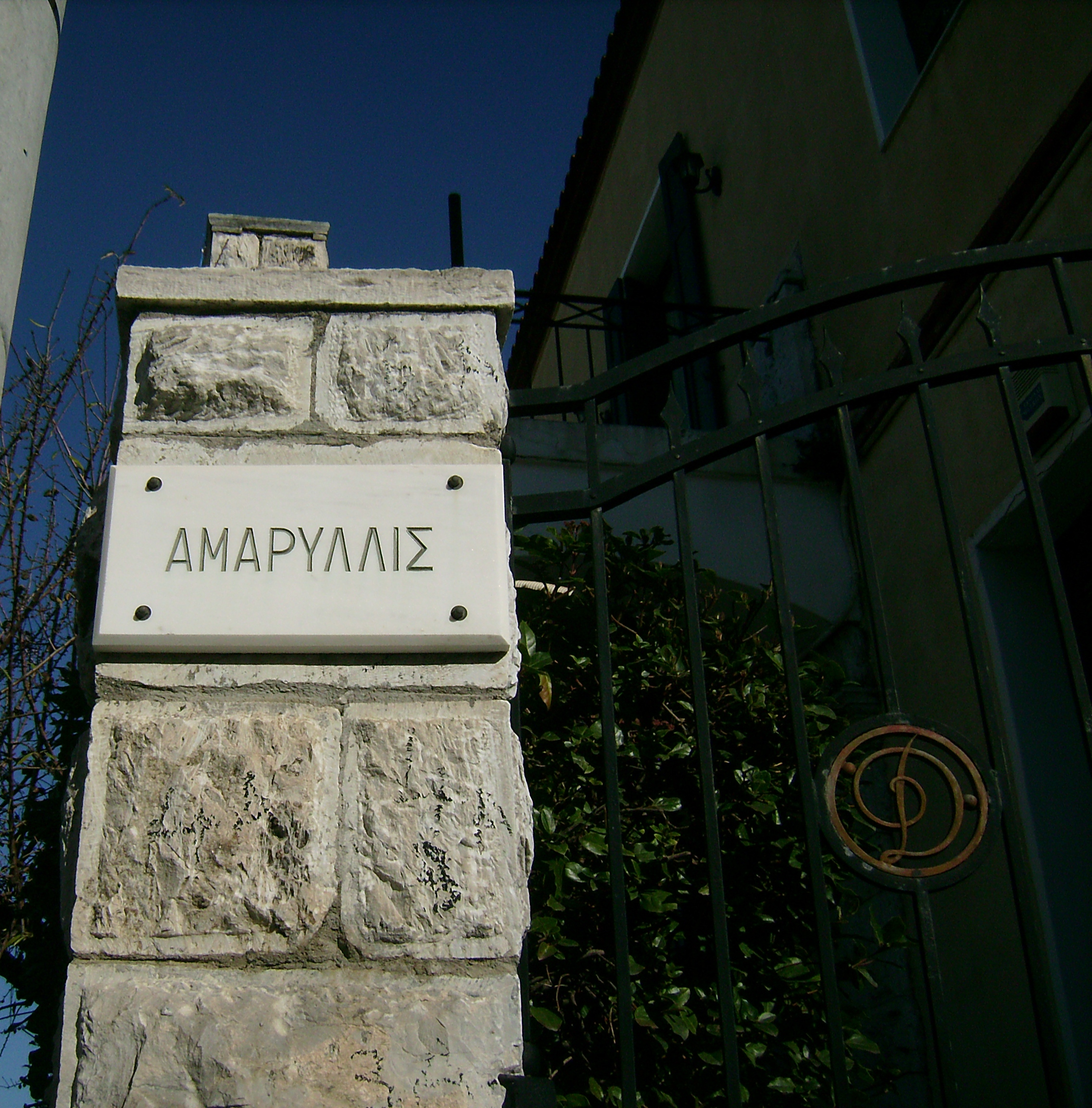
The Museum entrance: The name of the villa (“Amaryllis”) and the poet's monogram.

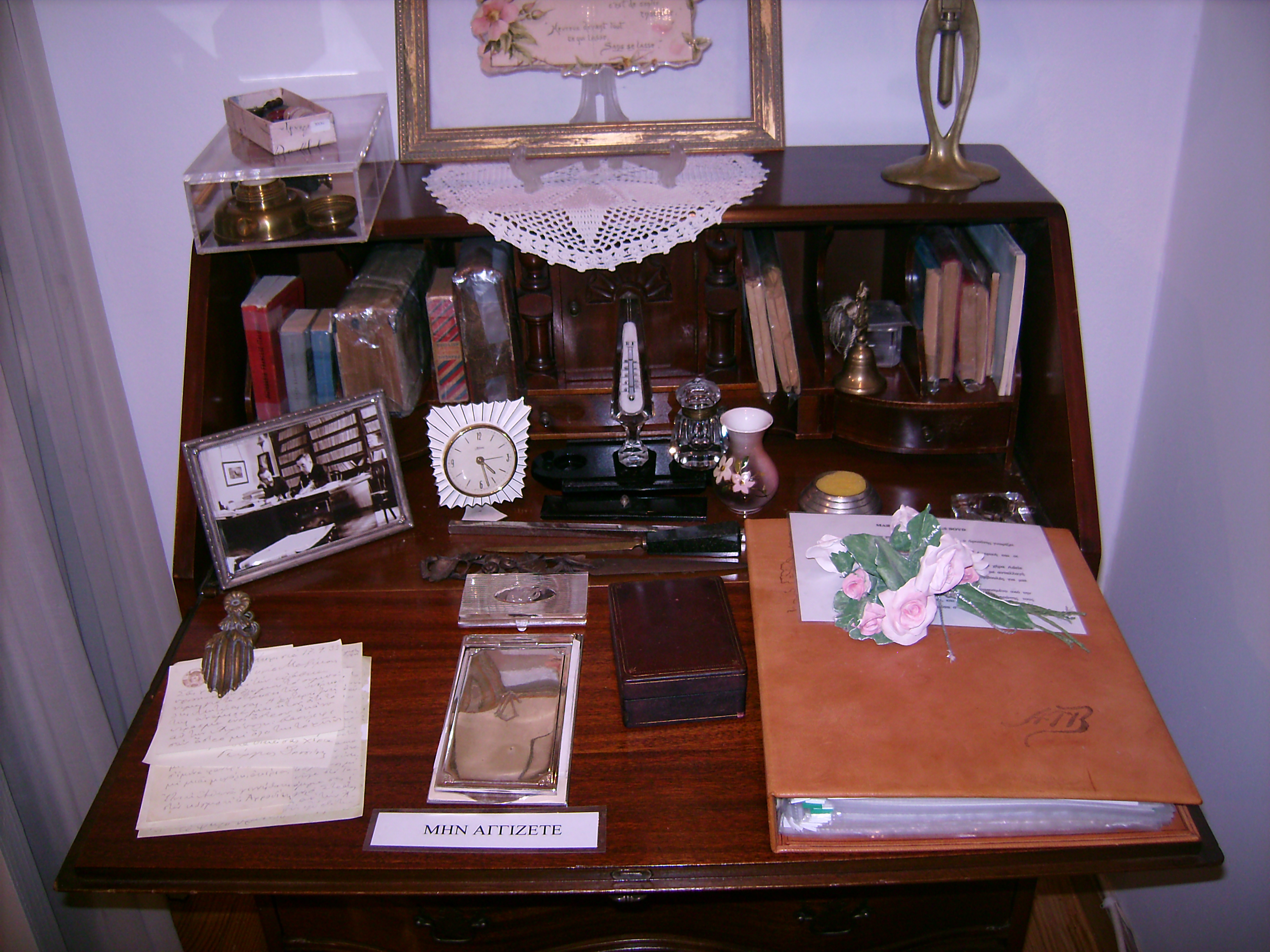
Secretary desk from the collection of G. Drossinis's personal belongings (‘Folk’ Hall).

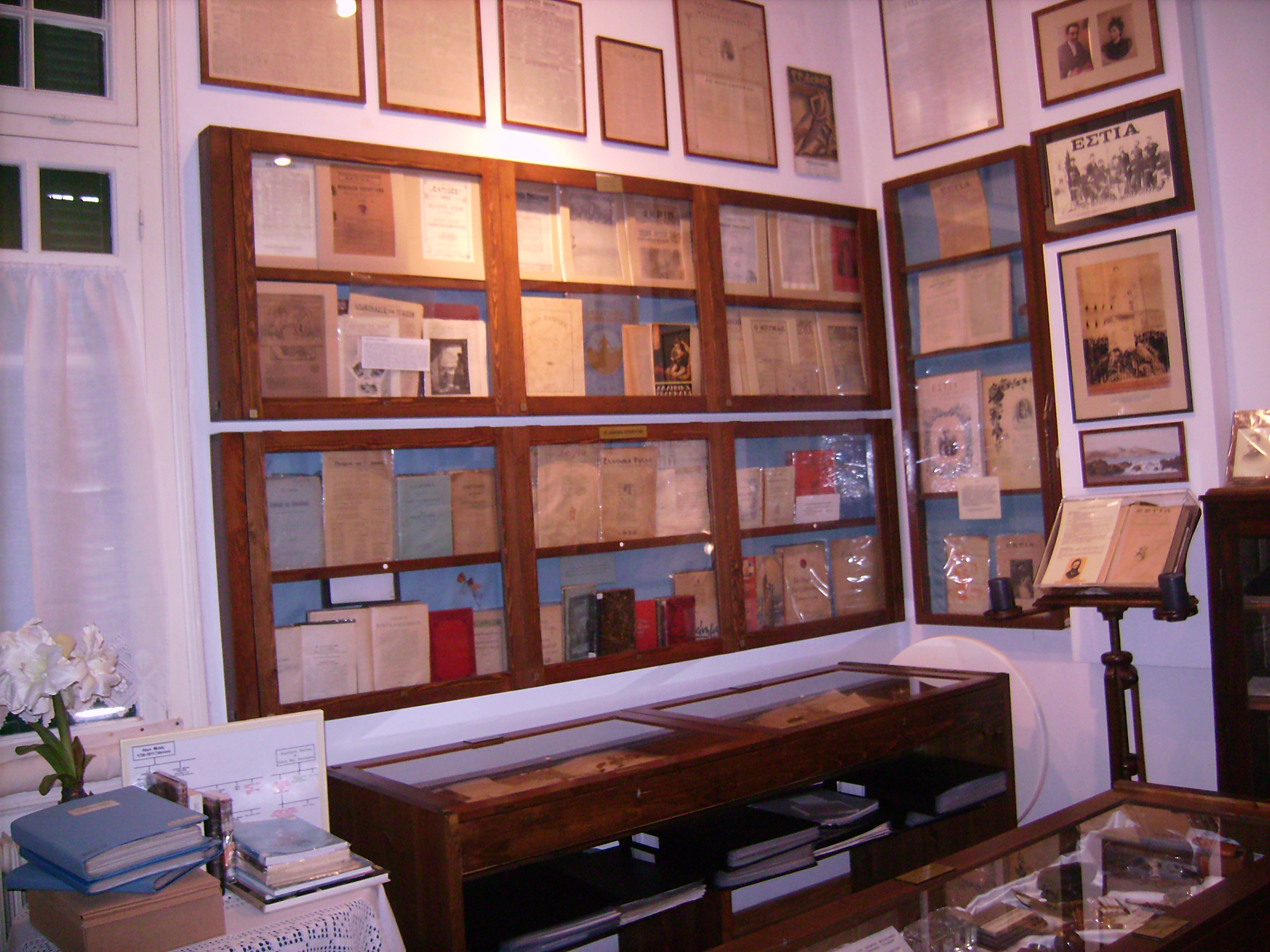
A collection of original publications in collaboration with G. Drossinis (‘Intellectual’ Hall).

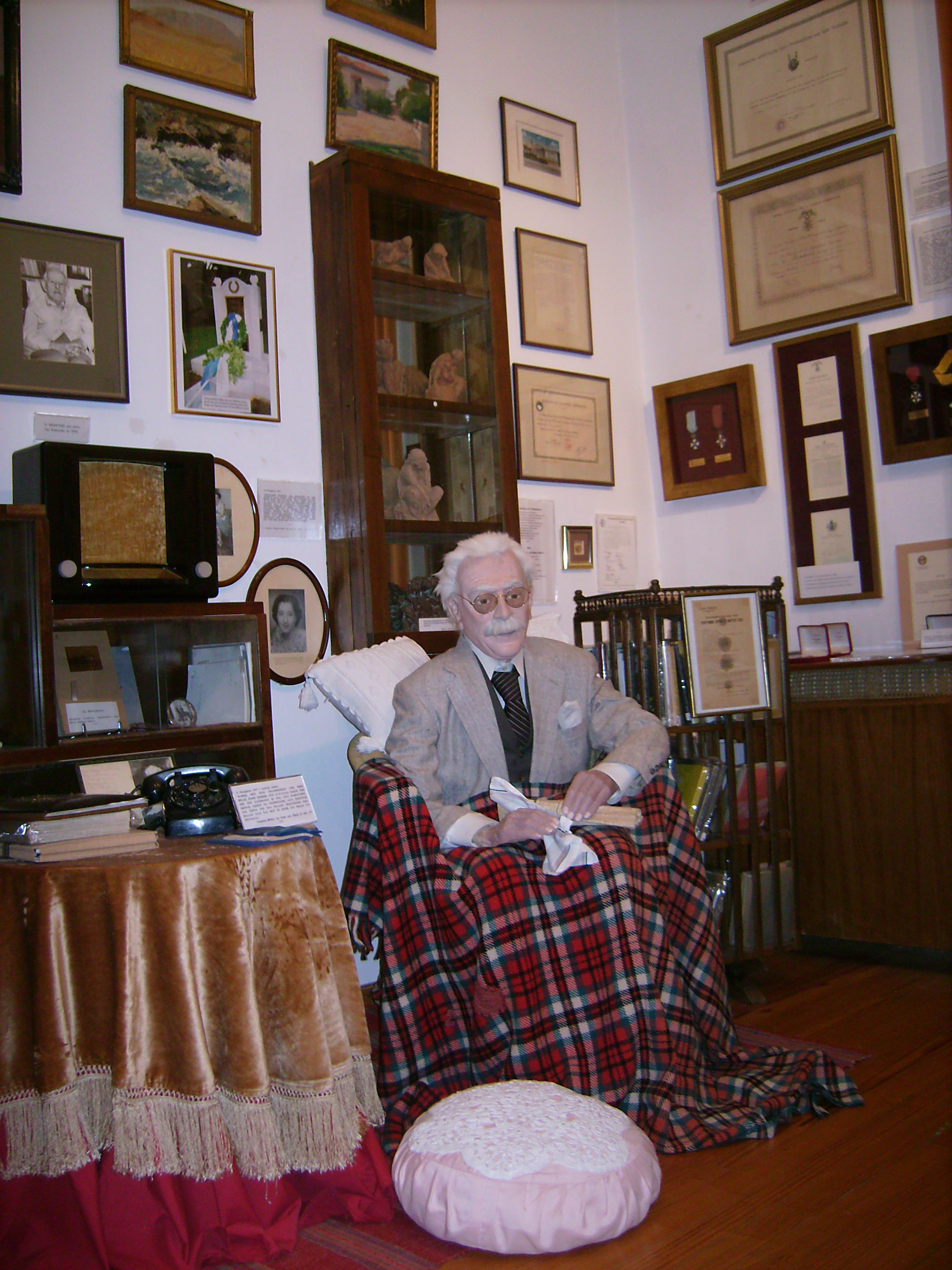
A figure of the poet at old age.

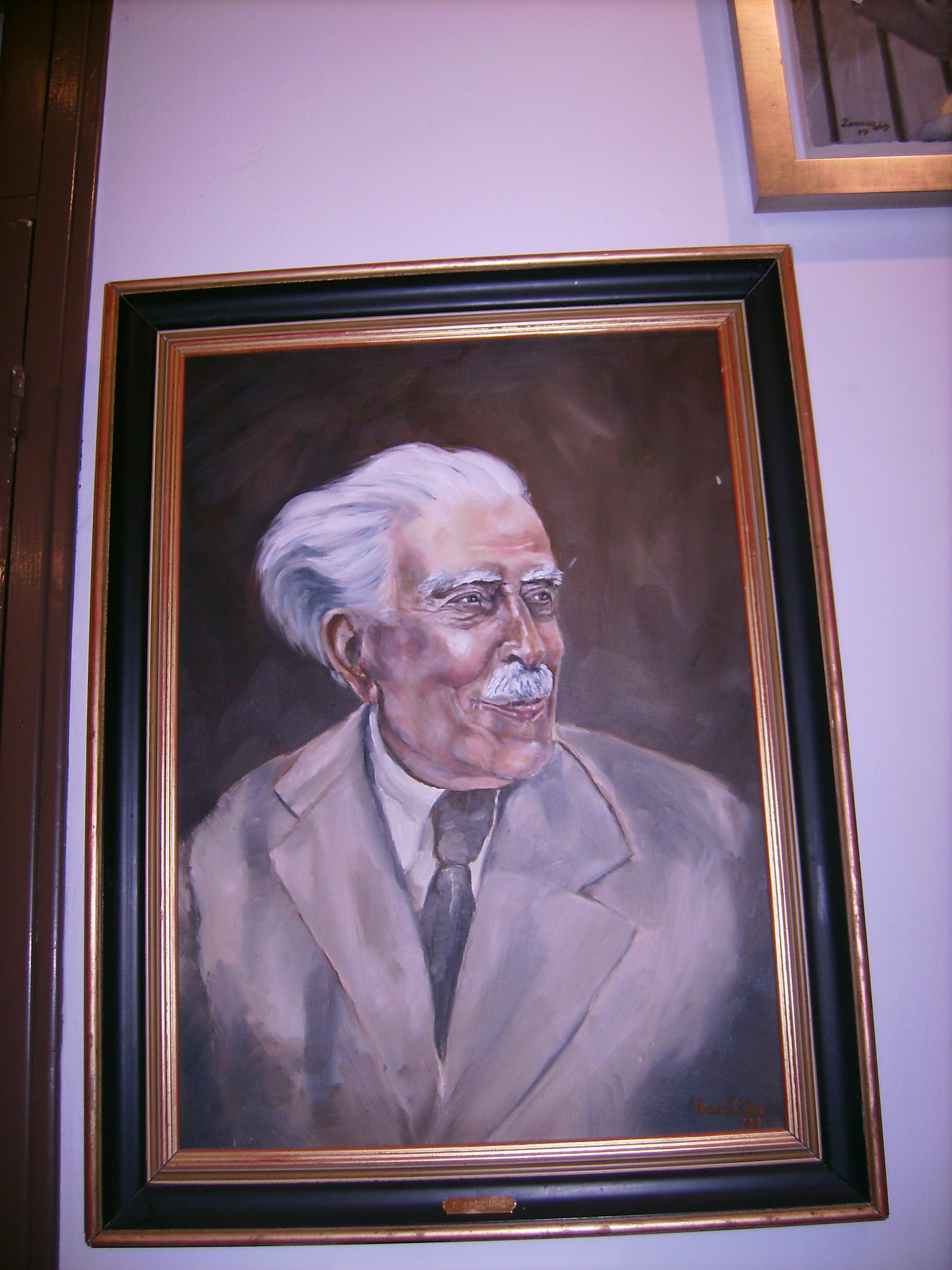
A portrait of the poet at old age.

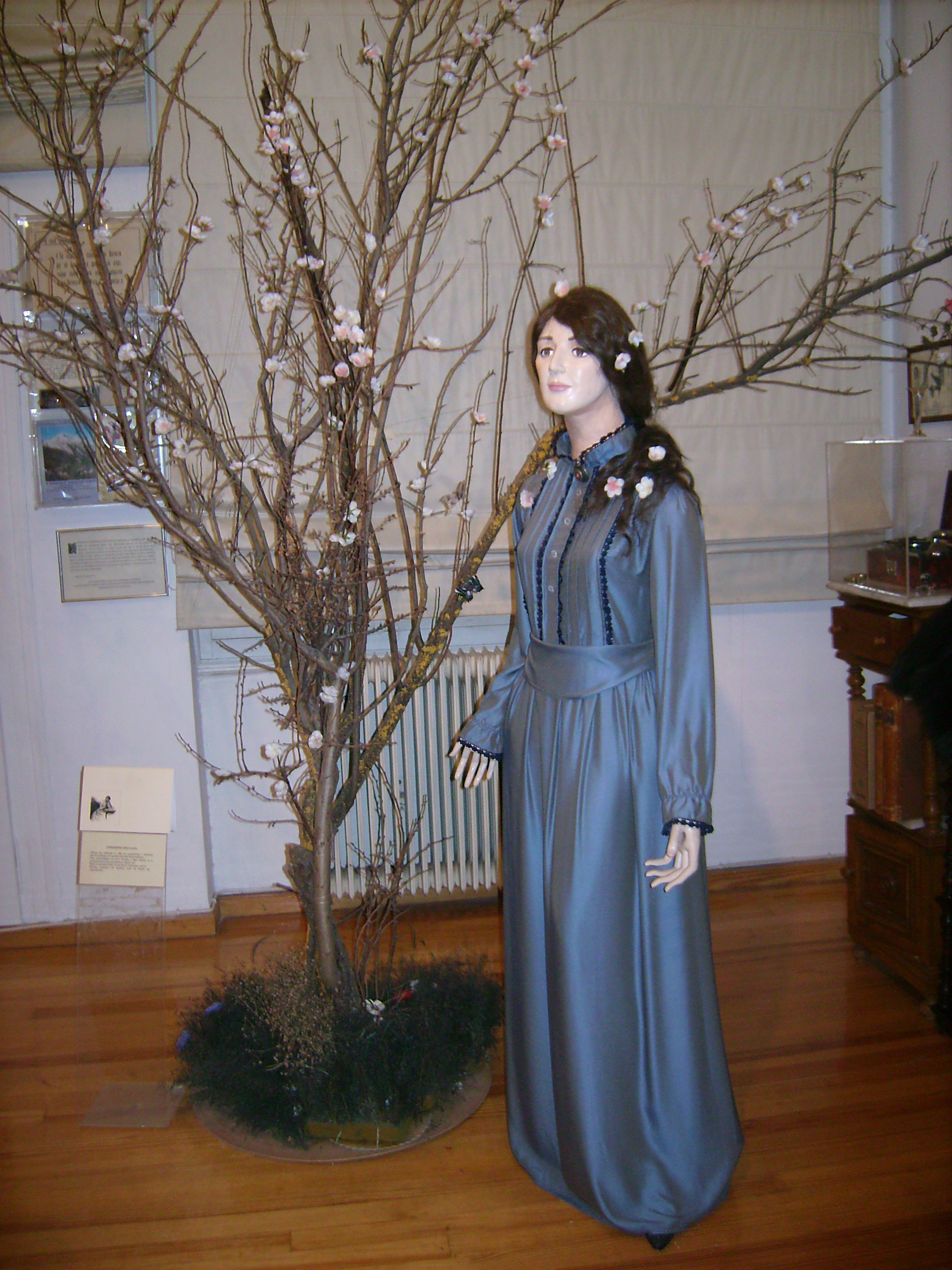
A figure of Drossina Drossini, who was the inspiration for the poem Anthismeni Amygdalia (“Blooming Almond Tree”)

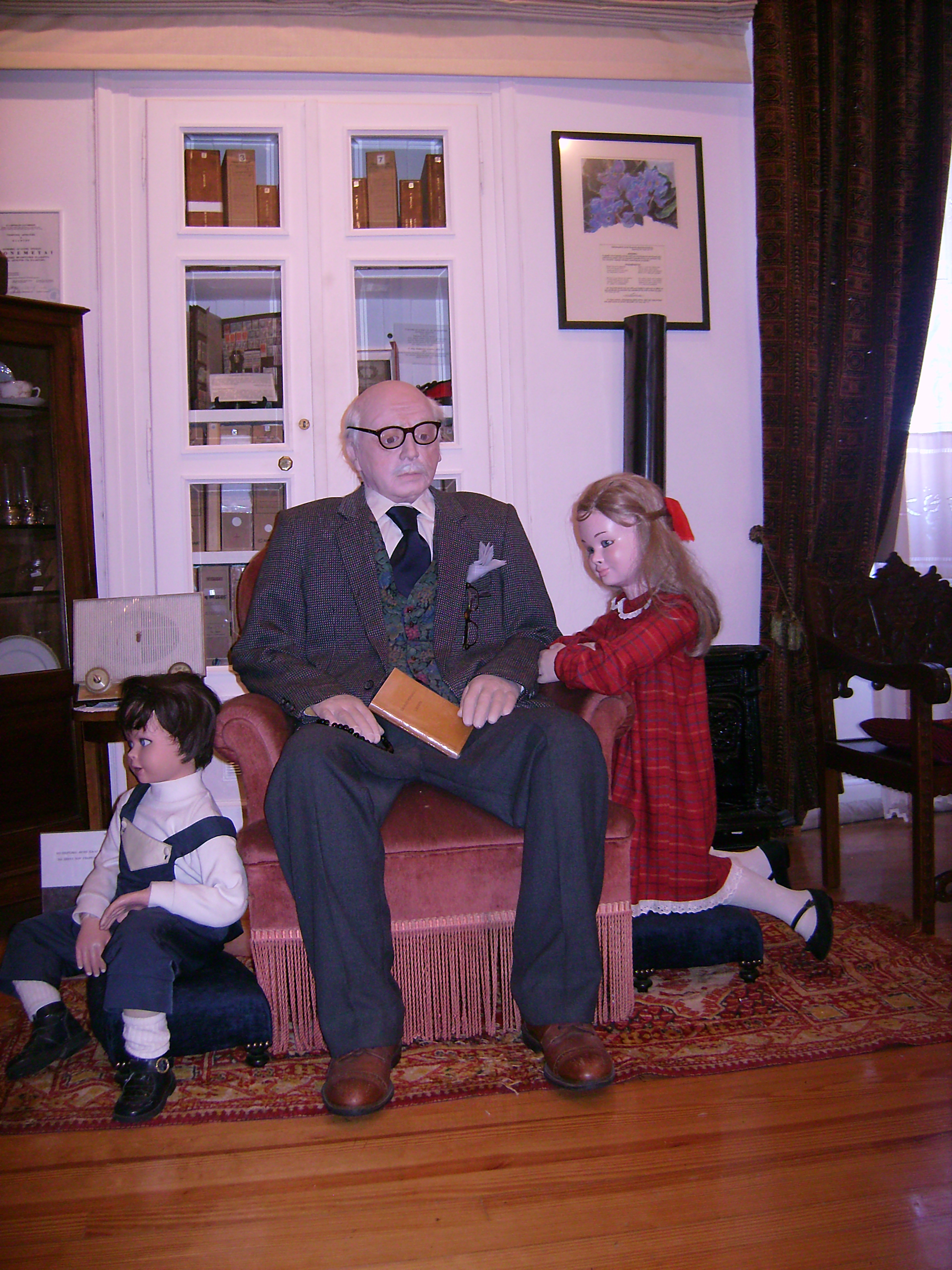
Figure of a grandfather reading fairy tales to his grandchildren. Drossinis loved children and wrote fairy tales, always with educational content (‘Folk’ Hall).

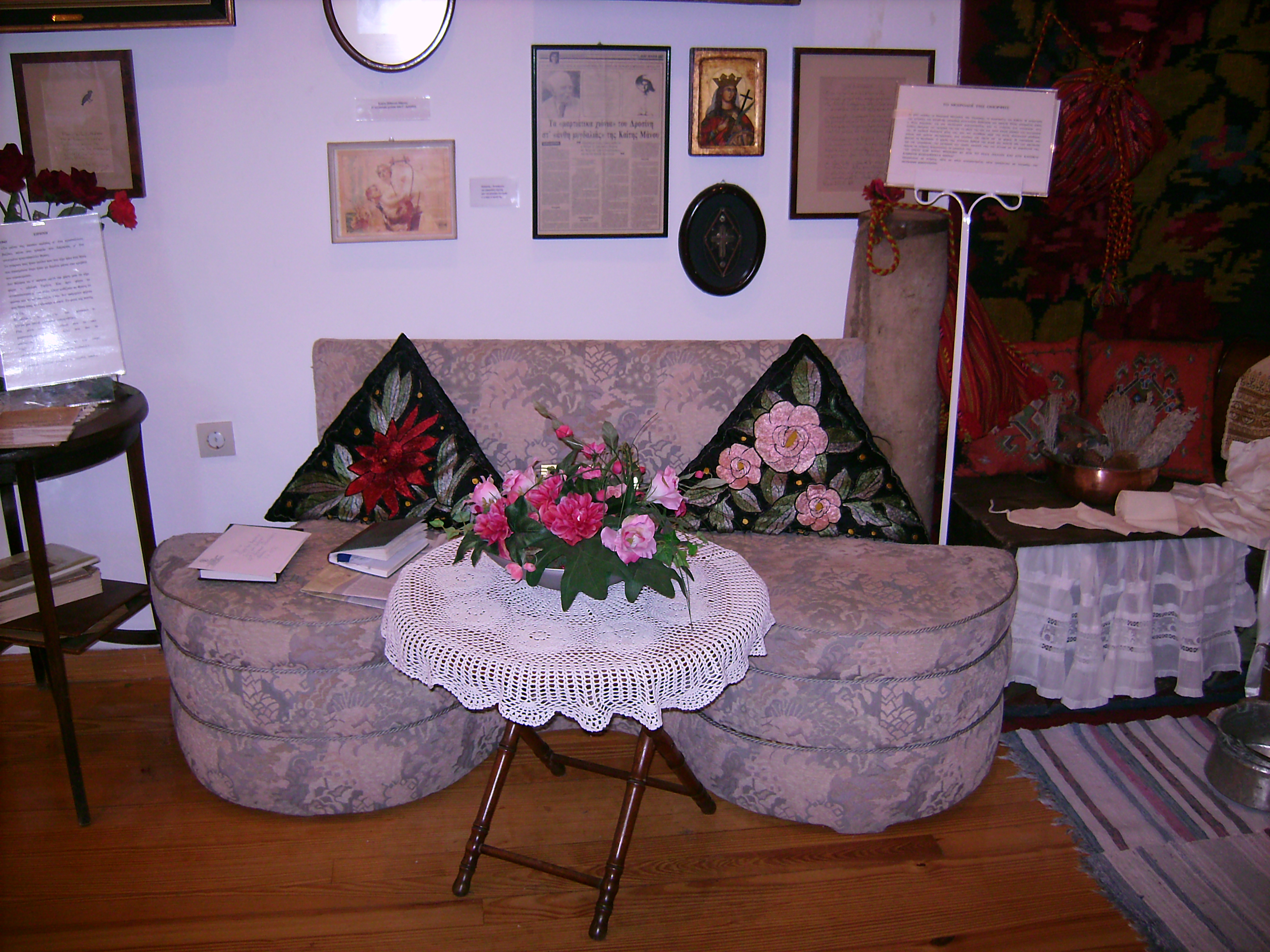
The small sofa on which he used to sit with Kate Manou, his last muse (‘Folk’ Hall).

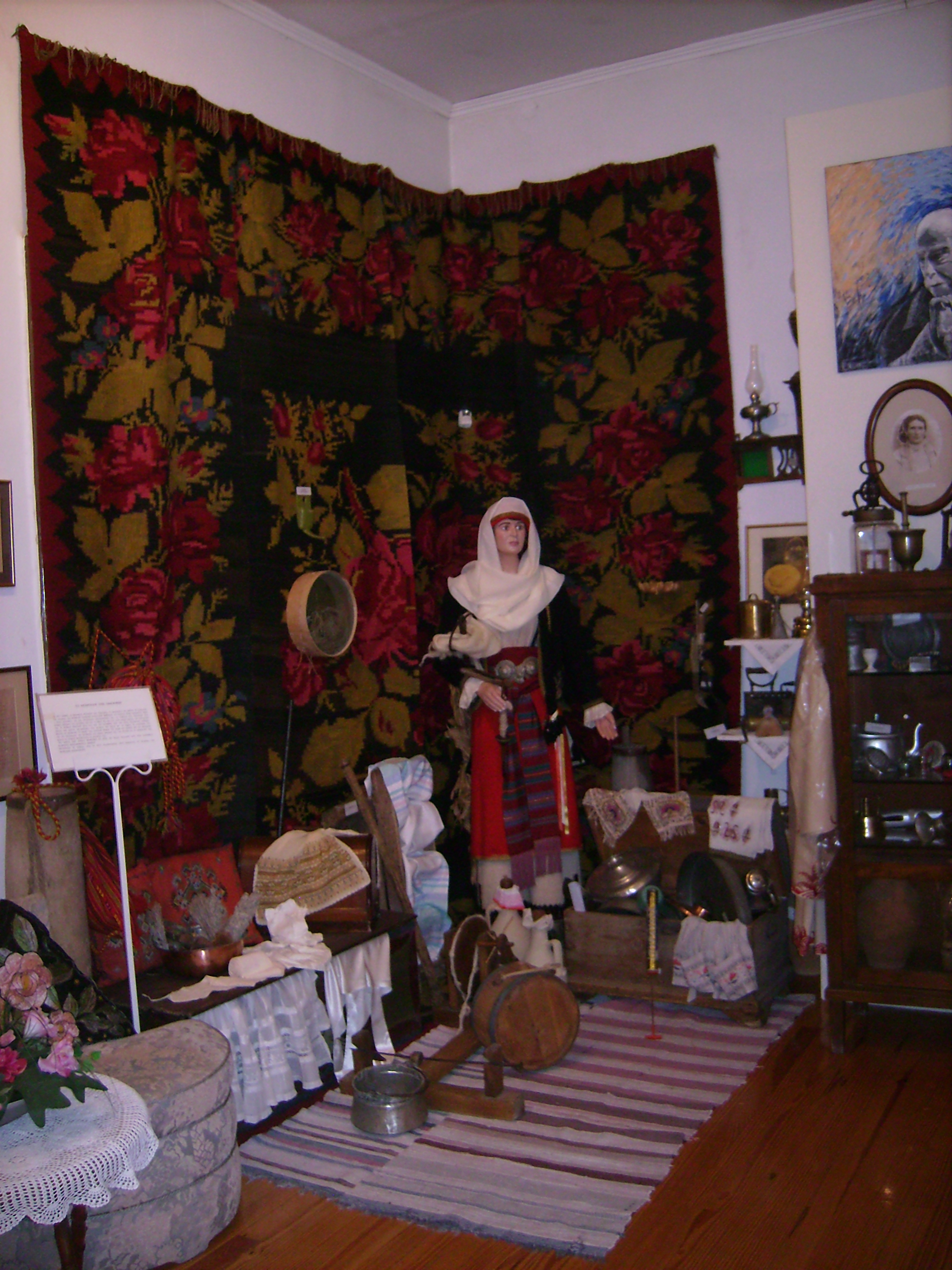
Eumorfoula, Drossinis's first platonic love. (‘Folk’ Hall).

== The "Friends of Drossinis Museum" Society ==
The ‘Friends of Drossinis Museum’ society, founded on the same year as the Museum itself, caters for the continuous renewal of the exhibits and the smooth functioning of the Museum, in collaboration with the Municipality of Kifisia. The members of the association keep Drossinis's memory alive by organising events, publishing books, which they send to all Greek libraries for free – especially school libraries – running competitions and being in charge of Museum tours. Finally, the association organises conferences on topics related to special needs, in accordance with Drossinis's sensitivity to these issues.
