= Athenian school =

Athenian school may refer to:

== Schools ==
- Athenian School, a boarding prep school in Danville, California, United States
- Athenian Academy or Platonic Academy, the lyceum of Classical Athens

== Other uses ==
- First Athenian School (1830–1880), a period of the literature of Greece
- New Athenian School (1880s), a period in the literature of Greece

== See also ==
- The School of Athens, a fresco by Raphael in the Apostolic Palace at the Vatican
- Academy of Athens (disambiguation)
