= Panagiotis Soutsos =

Greek poet, novelist and journalist (1806–1868)

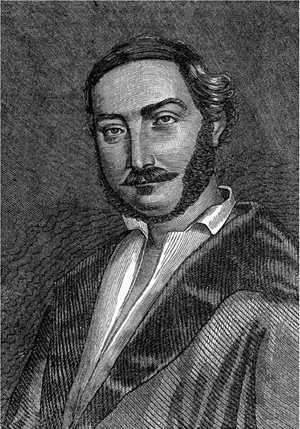
- Woodcut of Panagiotis Soutsos (1873)
- Born: 1806; Constantinople (modern Istanbul), Ottoman Empire
- Died: 25 October 1868 (aged 62); Athens, Greece
- Education: School of Chios
- Occupations: Poet, novelist, journalist
- Relatives: Alexandros Soutsos(brother)
- Writing career
- Period: 1831–1868
- Notable work: The Wayfarer (1831)
- Literary movement: Romantic poetry, First Athenian School

Panagiotis Soutsos (Greek: Παναγιώτης Σοῦτσος; 1806 – 25 October 1868) was a Greek poet, novelist and journalist born in Constantinople (modern Istanbul, Turkey). He was the brother of the satirist Alexandros Soutsos and cousin of writer and diplomat Alexandros Rizos Rangavis. Soutsos is known to be one of the pioneers of romanticism in Greek poetry and prose, as well as a visionary behind the new Olympic Games who inspired Evangelis Zappas to sponsor their revival.

== Life ==
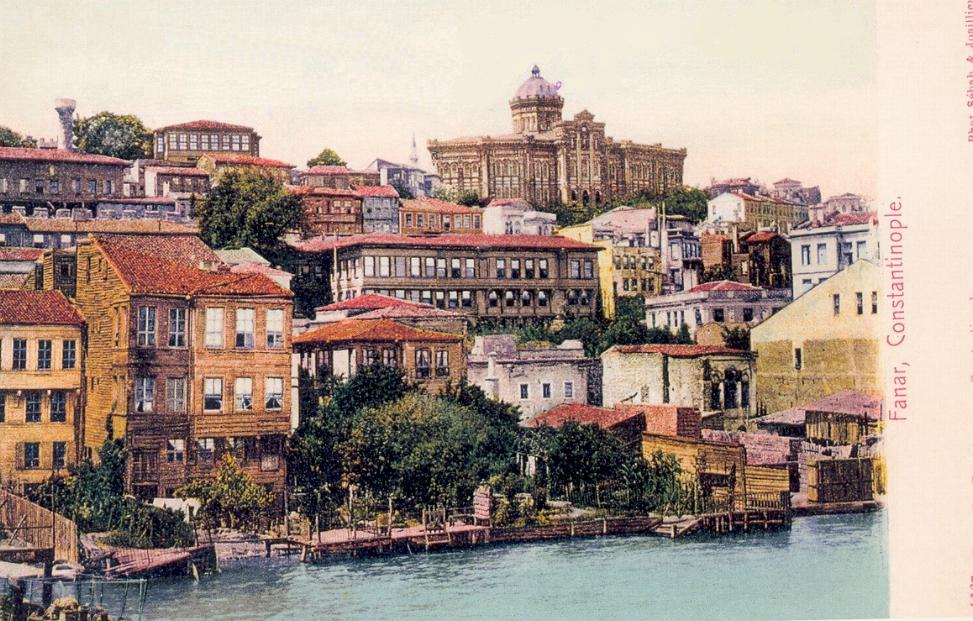
View of the Phanarion quarter, the historical centre of the Greek community of Constantinople in Ottoman times, ca. 1900

The Soutzos family was an important family of Phanariotes in Constantinople, many members of which were men of letters: his maternal uncle was Iakovos Pizos Neroulos, while his sister, Aikaterini Soutsou, was a poet. He was homeschooled by many important intellectuals of that time, and from 1818 till 1820, he and his brother studied in the School of Chios by educators such as Neophytos Vamvas and Constantinos Vardalachos. In 1820, due to the passing of their father, Konstantinos Soutsos, the two brothers moved to Transylvania where they stayed for a short while with their uncle. In April of the same year they departed to Paris with a recommendation letter of their uncle in order to meet Adamantios Korais. After moving again to Italy two years later, they both finally moved to Greece in 1825.

Following his arrival in Greece, he settled down in Nafplio in 1833, at the time the capital of the newly formed Greek State. There he started a political career and began writing his first poems. In 1830, he was appointed secretary of the senate by Ioannis Kapodistrias. However, he soon objected to his practices and lost his position. He was enthusiastic about the coming of King Otto and supported the work of the regency in his newspaper Helios (Ἥλιος; Greek for Sun) until the enactment of the heterogeneous law in 1843, under which citizens born in occupied territories no longer had the right of employment in the public sector. His political ideas turned into staunch conservatism ever since, something that also became evident through his use of an at times even atticizing language.

His life was later marked by several misfortunes. His first wife, Florentia Kopanitsa, died in 1841 at the age of 25 and his second one, Smaragda Soutsou, in 1845. His third wife, Marina Logotheti, left him in 1861. During the same period his brother Alexandros was dealing with many prosecutions due to his anti-governmental sentiments. Soutsos died in 1868 after chronic health problems and with most of his wealth gone.

== Work ==
Panagiotis Soutsos, along with his brother, was the originator of romanticism in poetry and prose of the First Athenian School with his poem The Wayfarer (Ὁ Ὁδοιπόρος) in 1831 and his novel Leander (Ὁ Λέανδρος) in 1834. The Wayfarer is a dialogic poem with a dramatic form but no scenic intention. The story revolves around the love between two young people, the Wayfarer and Rallou, which is presented in accordance with romantic motifs; a love that is met with various obstacles and which, ultimately unfulfilled, brings both protagonists to death. Central to the poem are themes of distraction, religion, and heartbreak. Soutsos kept editing the poem throughout his life, and every edition (1842, 1851, 1864) contained an increasingly archaic form of Greek, whereas his first edition was written in plain Katharevousa. Overall, Soutsos' poems are dominated by the lyric and elegiac tone, with the main subjects being religion, love and freedom, and all influenced by French Romanticism.

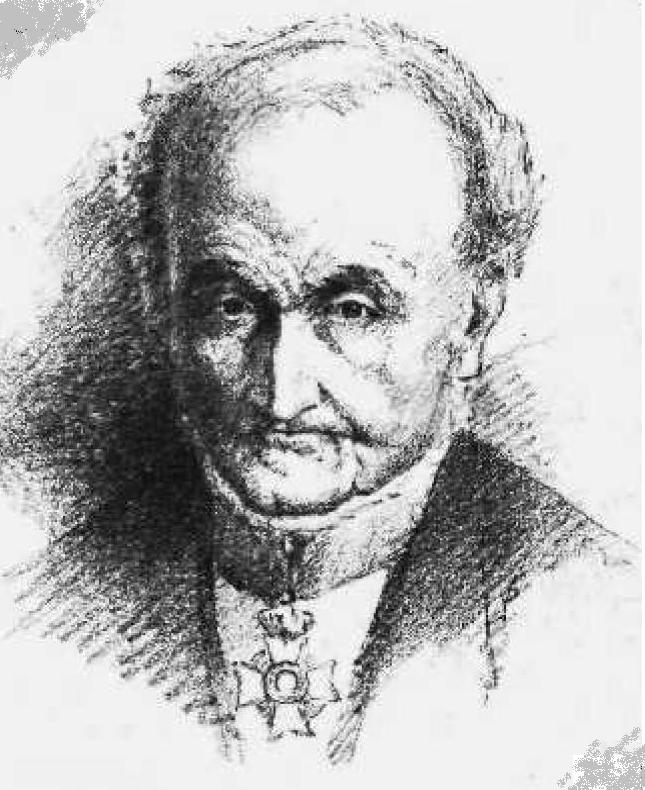
Konstantinos Asopios

Leander, the first novel of the freed Greek State, is an epistolary novel with heavy influence from Ugo Foscolo's The Last Letters of Jacopo Ortis and Goethe's The Sorrows of Young Werther. His second novel, Charitine, or The Beauty of the Christian Faith, according to its subtitle "Antidote for the nonsense of Ernest Renan against the deity of Jesus Christ" (ἀντίδοτον τῶν κατὰ τῆς θεότητος τοῦ Ἰησοῦ Χριστοῦ ληρημάτων τοῦ Ἐρνέστου Ρενάχου), has as its goal to refute the ideas of Ernest Renan. Other noteworthy stories of his were anonymously published in his newspaper. Memoirs of a Parrot (Ἀπομνημονεύματα ἑνὸς ψιττακοῦ) follows the narrative of a talking animal commenting on and criticizing the behavior of humans, and Τρισχιλιόπηχος is a science fiction story.

In 1853, Soutsos' opinions on language were laid out in his essay New School of the Written Word, or Resurrection of the Ancient Greek Language Understood by All (Νέα Σχολὴ τοῡ γραφομένου λόγου ἢ Ἀνάστασις τῆς ἀρχαίας ἑλληνικῆς γλώσσης ἐννοουμένης ὑπὸ πάντων), in which he objects to Korais' "middle way" in language reform in favour of fully reviving Ancient Greek, since in his eyes that was the language understood by most Greeks. He goes on to dismiss Demotic Greek as a language ridden with dialects and not always intelligible. Soutsos' linguistic positions were in response to a larger topic of discussion popular in mid-19th-century Greece, the Greek language question. His written proposal drew an immediate counter-attack from academic Konstantinos Asopios, notably in his essay The Soutseia, or Mr Panagiotis Soutsos scrutinized as a Grammarian, Philologist, Schoolmaster, Metrician and Poet (Τὰ Σούτσεια, ἤτοι Ὁ κύριος Παναγιώτης Σοῦτσος ἐν γραμματικοῖς, ἐν φιλολόγοῖς, ἐν σχολάρχαῖς, ἐν μετρικοῖς καὶ ἐν ποιηταῖς ἐξεταζόμενος). After pointing out errors and solecisms in Soutsos' own language, Asopios went on to defend Korais' "simplifying" approach on language, albeit with the addition of his own selection of archaisms. Their feud sparked a small war of pamphlets from other pedants competing to expose grammatical inconsistencies, errors and phrases literally translated from French in the works of their rivals, with proposals for implementing their own sets of rules.

== Olympic revival movement ==
Soutsos admired the ancient Greek tradition and often wandered in the ancient ruins. In 1833 he published the poem Dialogue of the Dead, in which the ghost of Plato surveys his tattered land in dismay, wonders if he is really looking at Greece and addresses:

Where are all your theaters and marble statues?
Where are your Olympic Games?

This work was the first reference for the revival of the ancient Olympic Games, as part of the revival of the ancient Greek tradition. Later, in 1835, he put his thoughts into action by writing to the Greek minister of interior, Ioannis Kolettis suggesting that 25 March, the anniversary of the outbreak of the Greek war of independence, should be declared a national holiday. Soutsos proposed that in this anniversary festivities should be held including a revival of the ancient Olympics. The idea of marking 25 March as national holiday was approved, but the Olympic revival plans appear to have been stalemated that time.

Finally, in early 1856, a wealthy merchant of the Greek diaspora in Romania, Evangelis Zappas, inspired by this revival effort was determined to found the Olympics and suggested to the Greek government to sponsor the entire project of the Olympic revival, providing also cash prizes for the victors. In 13 July 1856, Panagiotis Soutsos wrote and published an article titled "Evangelis Zappas" in his own newspaper, making Zappas' proposal widely known to the public and triggering a series of events. On 15 November 1859, 25 years after he conceived the idea, the first modern revival of the athletic Olympic Games took place in Athens. Moreover, on 18 October 1859, when his Olympic dream became reality, he published an account of the Games' events paying tribute to its sponsor, Evangelis Zappas.

== Bibliography ==
=== Newspapers ===
- Helios (Ἥλιος, 1833)

=== Poetry ===
- Poems (Ποιήσεις, 1831)
- The Guitar (Ἡ Κιθάρα, 1835)

=== Prose ===
- Memoirs of a Parrot (Ἀπομνημονεύματα ἑνὸς ψιττακοῦ, 1833)
- Ὁ Τρισχιλιόπηχος, 1833
- Leander (Ὁ Λέανδρος, 1834)
- Charitine, or The Beauty of the Christian Faith (Ἡ Χαριτίνη ἢ Τὸ κάλλος τῆς Χριστιανικῆς θρησκείας, 1864)

=== Plays ===
- The Messiah (Ὁ Μεσσίας, 1839)
- Euthymius Blachabas (Ὁ Εὐθύμιος Βλαχάβας, 1839)
- The Stranger (Ὁ Ἄγνωστος, 1842)
- Karaiskakis (Ὁ Καραϊσκάκης, 1842)

=== Essays ===
- New School of the Written Word, or Resurrection of the Ancient Greek Language Understood by All (Νέα Σχολὴ τοῡ γραφομένου λόγου ἢ Ἀνάστασις τῆς ἀρχαίας ἑλληνικῆς γλώσσης ἐννοουμένης ὑπὸ πάντων, 1853)

== Sources ==
- Golden Mark (2009). Greek Sport and Social Status. Fordyce W. Mitchel Memorial Lecture. University of Texas Press. ISBN 978-0-292-71869-2.
- Mackridge Peter (2009). Language and National Identity in Greece, 1766-1976. Oxford University Press. ISBN 978-0-19-921442-6.
- Matthews George R. (2005). America's First Olympics: The St. Louis Games of 1904. University of Missouri Press. ISBN 0-8262-1588-2.
- Young David C. (2004). A brief history of the Olympic games. Brief histories of the ancient world. UWiley-Blackwell. ISBN 978-1-4051-1130-0.
