= Kostis Palamas =

Greek poet (1859–1943)

- Born: 13 January 1859; Patras, Greece
- Died: 27 February 1943 (aged 84); Athens, Greece
- Education: University of Athens (no degree)
- Occupation: Poet

Kostis Palamas (/pæləˈmɑːs/; Greek: Κωστής Παλαμάς [palaˈmas]; 13 January [O.S. 1 January] 1859 – 27 February 1943) was a Greek poet who wrote the words to the Olympic Hymn. He was a central figure of the Greek literary generation of the 1880s and one of the cofounders of the so-called New Athenian School (or Palamian School, or Second Athenian School) along with Georgios Drosinis and Ioannis Polemis.

== Biography ==
Born in Patras, in the same house as born the Italian novelist Matilde Serao, he received his primary and secondary education in Mesolonghi. In 1877 he enrolled at the School of Law, Economics and Political Sciences of the University of Athens, but he soon abandoned his studies. In the 1880s, he worked as a journalist. He published his first collection of verses, Songs of My Fatherland, in 1886.

He was nominated for the Nobel Prize for Literature on 14 occasions, but never received it. He held an administrative post at the University of Athens between 1897 and 1926.

Palamas died on 27 February 1943, during the Axis occupation of Greece in World War II. His funeral at the First Cemetery of Athens on the next day became a major symbolic event of the Greek resistance against the occupation. In a service spontaneously attended by several thousand people, the funerary poem composed and recited by fellow poet Angelos Sikelianos roused the mourners and culminated in a major public demonstration of defiance of the occupying powers, whose representatives, come to lay a wreath at the poet's tomb, were greeted by the crowd with the Greek national anthem and shouts of 'Long Live Freedom'.

== Work ==
Palamas wrote the lyrics to the Olympic Hymn, composed by Spyridon Samaras. It was first performed at the 1896 Summer Olympics, the first modern Olympic Games. The Hymn was then shelved as each host city from then until the 1960 Winter Olympics commissioned an original piece for its celebration of the Games, but the version by Samaras and Palamas was declared the official Olympic Anthem in 1958 and has been performed at each celebration of the Games since the 1960 Winter Olympics.

== Honors ==
The old administration building of the University of Athens, in central Athens, where his office was located, is now dedicated to him as the "Kostis Palamas Building" and houses the "Greek Theater Museum", as well as many temporary exhibitions.

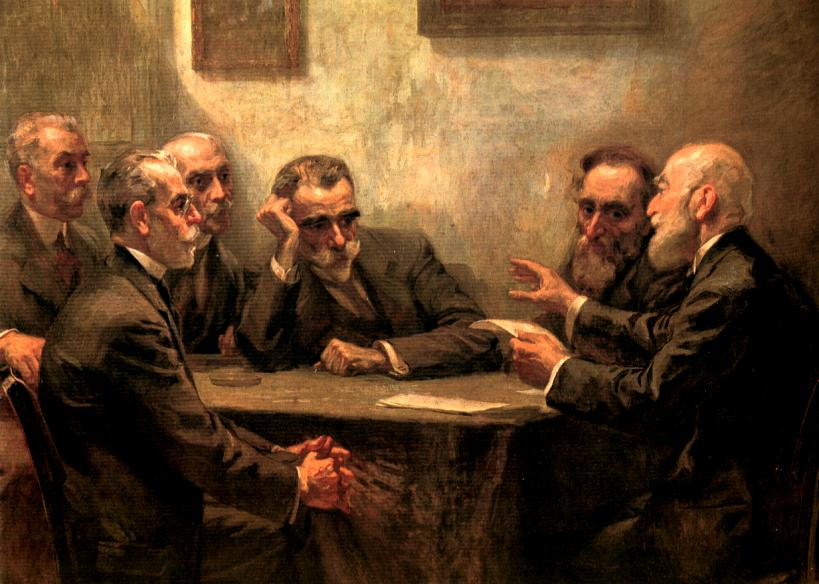
Parnassos Literary Society. From left: Georgios Stratigis, Georgios Drossinis, Ioannis Polemis, Palamas at the center, Georgios Souris and Aristomenis Provelengios, poets of the New Athenian School (or Palamian School). Painting by Georgios Roilos

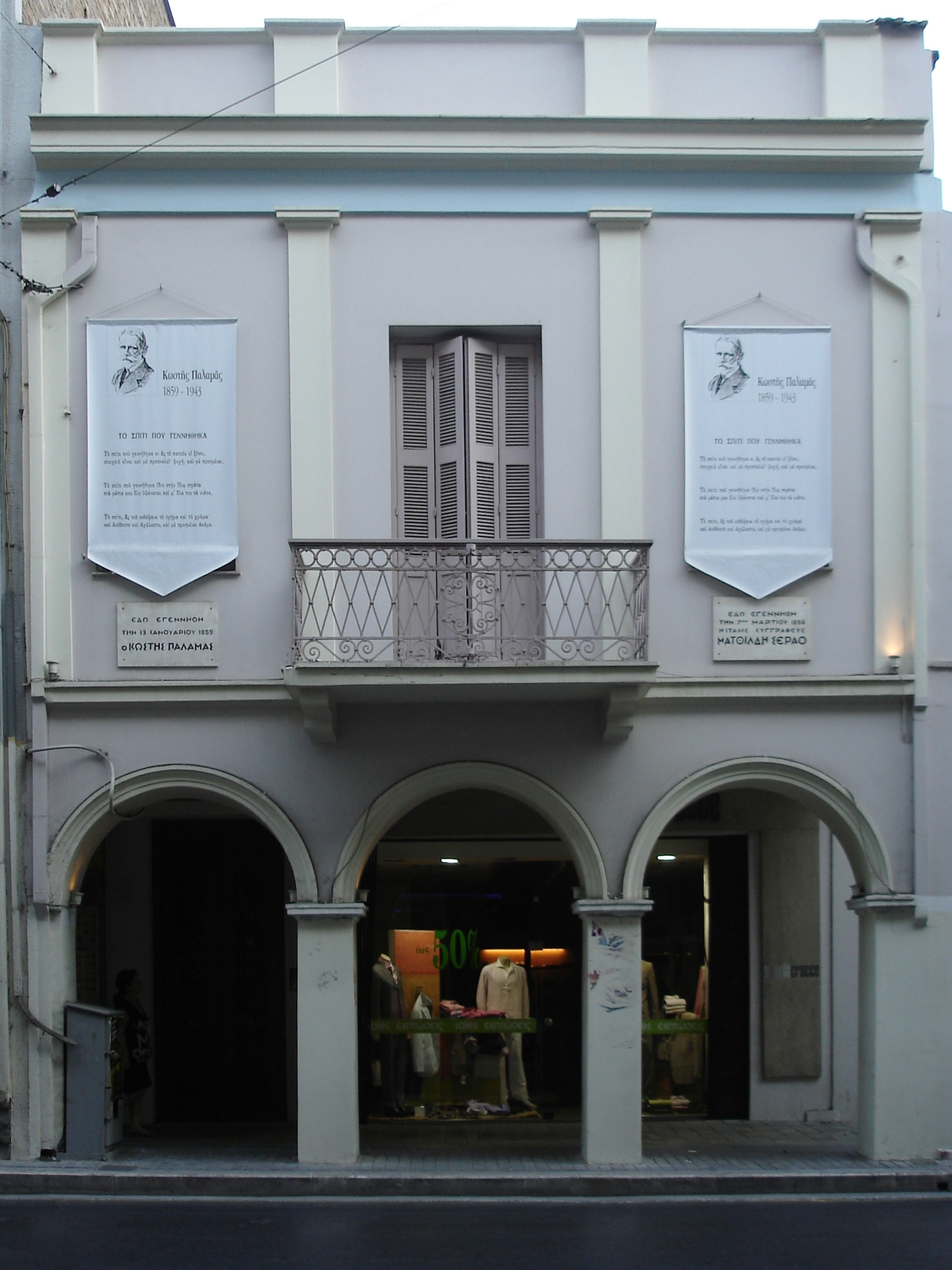
Residence of Palamas in Patras

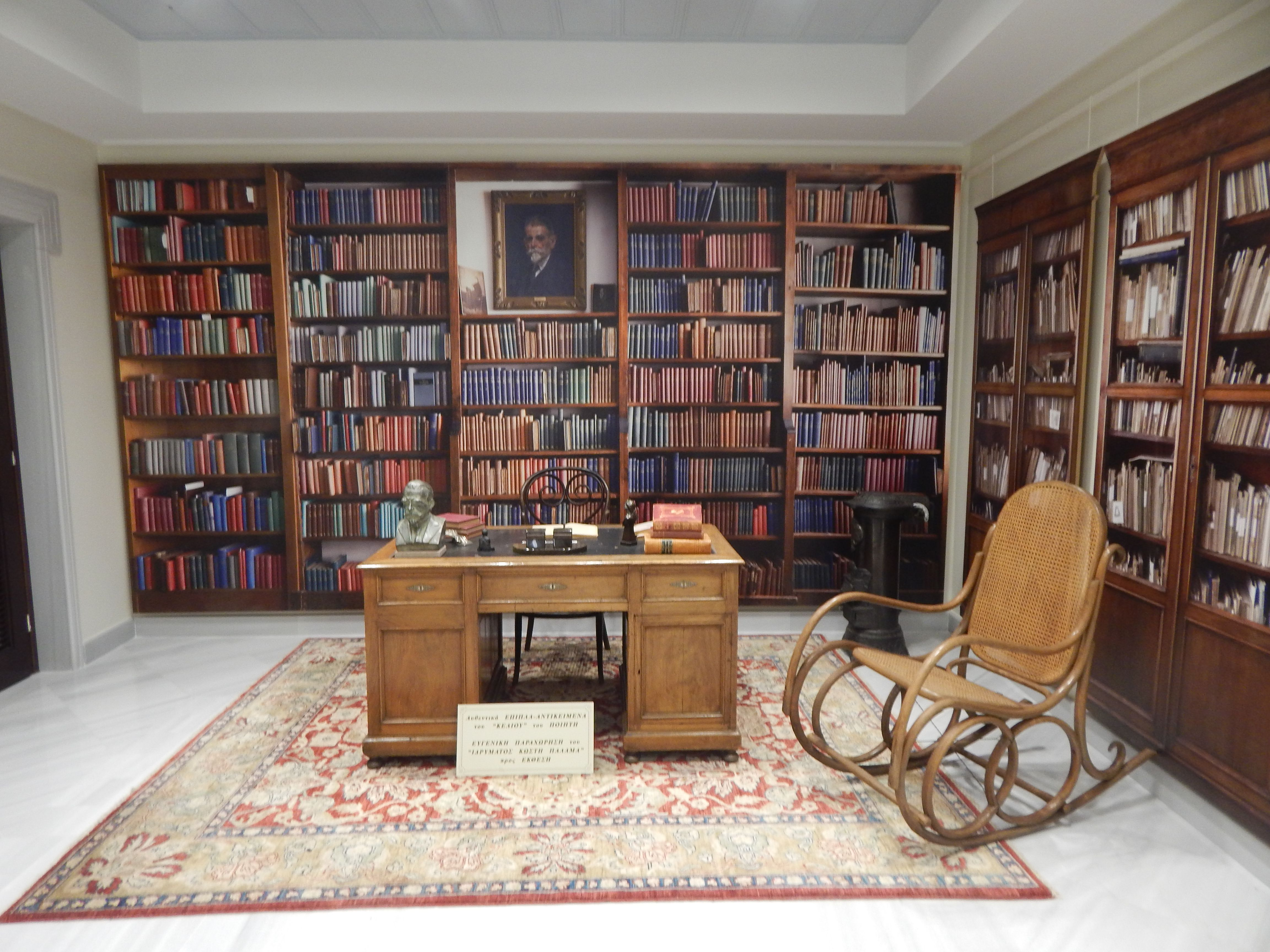
Inside the Palamas house

Palamas has been informally called the "national" poet of Greece. He was an influential voice in Greek literature for more than 30 years, and greatly influenced the entire political-intellectual climate of his time. Romain Rolland considered him the greatest poet in Europe.

== Works ==
=== Collections of poems ===
- Songs of my Fatherland (1886)
- Hymn to Athena (1889)
- Eyes of my Soul (1892)
- Iambs and Anapaests (1897)
- The Grave (1898)
- The Greetings of the Sun-born (1900)
- Ή Ασάλευτη Ζωή (The Motionless Life)(1904)
- Twelve Lays of the Gypsy (1907)
- The King's flute (1910)
- Yearnings of the Lagoon (1912)
- Satirical Exercises (1912)
- The State and Solitude (1912)
- Altars (1915)
- Extempora (1919)
- The 14 verses (1919)
- The 5 verses - The passionate secret whispers - The Wolves - Two flowers from afar (1925)
- Cowardly and Harsh verses (1928)
- The 3 Verse Cycle (1929)
- Passages and Greetings (1931)
- The Nights of Phemius (1935)
- Evening Fire (1944, posthumous edition by his son, Leander Palamas)

=== Prose ===
- Death of a Youth (novel, 1901)
- Novels (1920)

=== Theater ===
- The Thrice-noble (drama, 1903)

=== Criticism ===
Palamas was one of the most respected literary critics of his day, and instrumental in the reappraisal of the works of Andreas Kalvos, Dionysios Solomos and the "Ionian School" of poetry, Kostas Krystallis et al.

== Translations ==
- The King's Flute, tr. T. P. Stephanides, G. C. Katsimbalis (1982) [Greek and English texts]
- The King's Flute, tr. F. Will (1967)
- The Twelve Lays of the Gypsy, tr. G. Thomson (1969)
- The Twelve Words of the Gypsy, tr. T. P. Stephanides, G. C. Katsimbalis (1974; repr. 1975)
- A Hundred Voices, tr. T. P. Stephanides, G. C. Katsimbalis (1976)
- Ruins, Grief, On The Trip You Are Taken, Rose Fragrance, tr. A. Moskios
