= Black Is the Night =

Greek Army marching song

"Black Is the Night" (Greek: Μαύρη είναι η νύχτα, romanized: Mávri eínai i nýchta) or "The Klepht" (Ο Κλέφτης, O Kléftis) is a marching song of the Hellenic Army. The lyrics are by Alexandros Rizos Rangavis, while the music is based on a Bavarian military march.

== Lyrics ==
Greek lyrics Μαύρ' είν' η νύκτα στα βουνά, στους κάμπους πέφτει χιόνι. Μες στ' άγρια, στα σκοτεινά, στες τραχιές πέτρες, στα στενά, ο κλέφτης ξεσπαθώνει. Στο δεξί χέρι το γυμνό βαστά αστροπελέκι. Παλάτι έχει το βουνό και σκέπασμα τον ουρανό, κ' ελπίδα το τουφέκι. Φεύγουν οι τύραννοι χλωμοί το μαύρο του μαχαίρι· μ' ιδρώτα βρέχει το ψωμί, ξέρει να ζήσει με τιμή, και να πεθάνει ξέρει. Τον κόσμ' ο δόλος διοικεί κι η άδικ' ειμαρμένη. Τα πλούτη έχουν οι κακοί, κι εδώ στους βράχους κατοικεί η αρετή κρυμμένη.	English translation Black is the night on the mountains Snow fall on the rocks. In the dark, in the wild nature, on the rough stones, the narrows, the klepht hits his sword. In his right hand holds a thunderbolt. The mountain is his palace, the sky his covering and the gun his hope. The tyrants flee scared by his black knife. With sweat rains his bread, he knows how to live with honor, and how to die. The wiliness runs the world and the unjust fate. The bad owns the wealth and here on the rocks resides, the hidden virtue.
