= Alexandros Soutsos =

Greek poet (1803–1863)

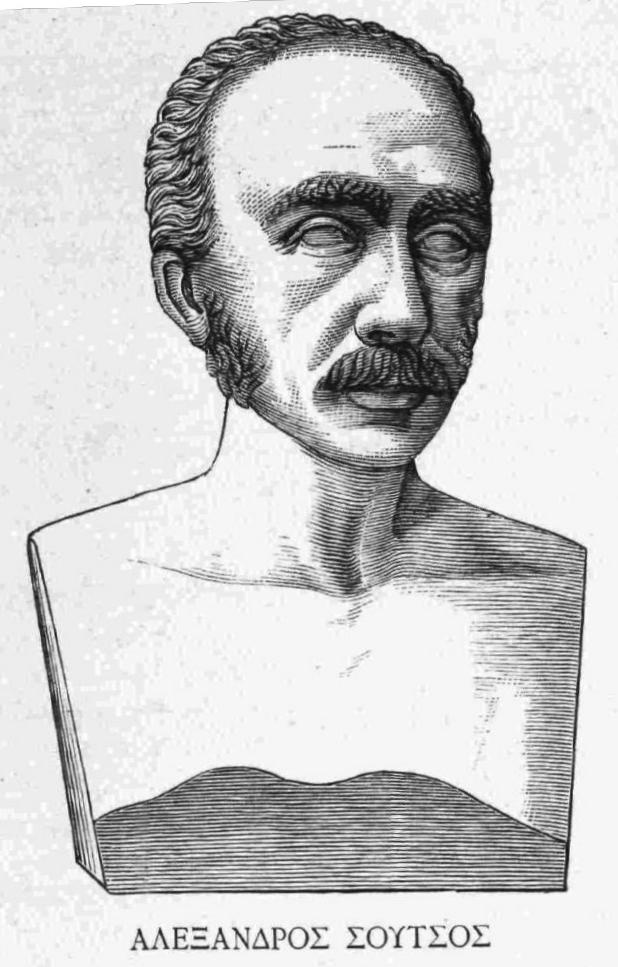
- Born: 1803; Constantinople (modern Istanbul) Ottoman Empire
- Died: 1863 (aged 59–60); Athens, Greece
- Occupations: poet, writer, journalist
- Relatives: Panagiotis Soutsos
- Writing career
- Notable works: The Exile of 1831 (novel); The Wanderer (poem); The Greek that battle the Turks (Hē turkomachos Hellas) (poem)
- Literary movement: First Athenian School

Alexandros Soutsos (Greek: Ἀλέξανδρος Σοῦτσος) (1803–1863) was a Greek poet from a prominent Phanariote family. He founded the Greek Romantic school of poetry. Soutsos was born in Istanbul in 1803 from Chian parentage. At the time of the Greek Revolution, he was a young, liberal partisan. He wrote poems to encourage the insurgents. Soutsos studied in Chios, where he spent his formative years. Later he moved to Paris, where he was influenced by the liberal philosophies of the French intellectuals. His major work of prose was the novel O exóristos tou 1831 (The Exile of 1831). His works were instrumental in developing liberal thought in the young Greek monarchy. Soutsos was an admirer of Lord Byron, and he tried to emulate his grandiose style. The resultant work was his longest poem Periplanómenos (The Wanderer), which, in spite of some positive reviews, never achieved international success. In spite of his lack of artistic respect, he was admired by many of his contemporaries. The Greek people admired him for his dedication to freedom, and for his liberal ideas. He died in Athens in 1863, and his works were published in 1916.

Evangelis Zappas, a wealthy Greek merchant based in Romania, explicitly requested that Alexandros Soutsos and his brother Panagiotis Soutsos be made members of the Organizing Committee of the Olympics. It was Panagiotis Soutsos who first made mention of a revival of the Olympic Games, in his Lucian of Samosata-inspired poem Dialogue of the Dead (1833), in which Plato's spirit returns to 19th century Greece, and gazes upon it in despair, uttering the words: "Where are all your theatres and marble statues? / Where are your Olympic Games?" In 1835, Panagiotis Soutsos followed this up with a letter to the Greek Minister of the Interior, Ioannis Kolettis, proposing that 25 March, the anniversary of the outbreak of the Greek War of Independence, should be declared a national holiday, marked by festivities including a revival of the ancient Olympics.
