= Academy of Athens =

Academy of Athens may refer to:

- Platonic Academy, founded by Plato in c. 387 BC
- Academy of Athens (modern), Greece's national academy, established in 1926

== See also ==
- Athens Academy (school), a college preparatory school in Athens, Georgia, United States
- Athenian school (disambiguation)
