= Dimosthenis Valavanis =

Greek poet

Dimosthenis Valavanis (Greek: Δημοσθένης Βαλαβάνης; 1829–1854) was a Greek poet of the First Athenian School.

He was born in 1829 in Karytaina. As a child he was orphaned and moved to live with relatives in Nauplio where he finished school. He enrolled in the Faculty of Medicine in the University of Athens. Before graduating he contracted tuberculosis and died in Athens in 1854.

As he died very young he did not manage to publish a poetry collection. Some of his poems were published in literary magazines. He is one of the few poets of the First Athenian School that wrote poems both in Katharevousa and Demotic Greek. He also wrote a novel titled Two Nights which was published in Euterpi magazine and a tragedy (The Death of Papaflessas) which is lost. Modern critics have found in his work the prospects of a creative force which was cut short because of his early death.
