= New Athenian School =

Greek literary movement

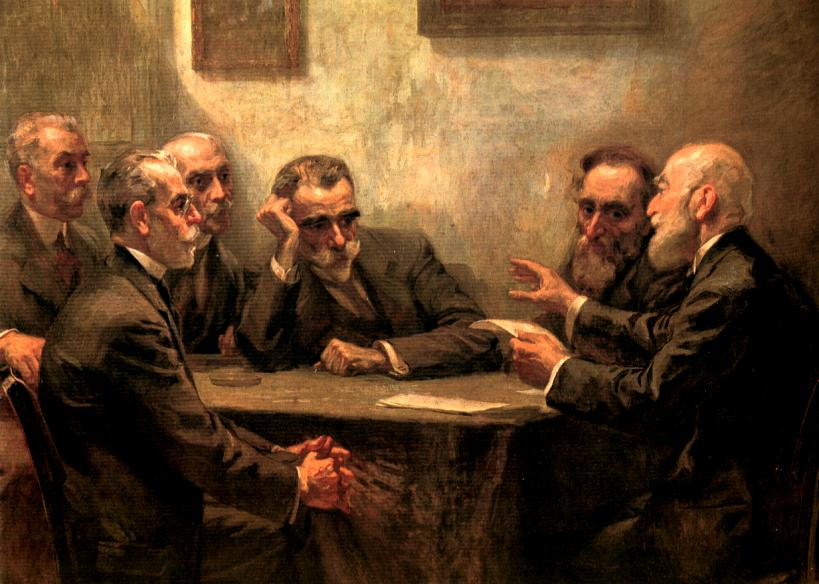
Parnassos Literary Society. From left: Georgios Stratigis, Georgios Drossinis, Ioannis Polemis, Palamas at the center, Georgios Souris and Aristomenis Provelengios, poets of the New Athenian School. Painting by Georgios Roilos

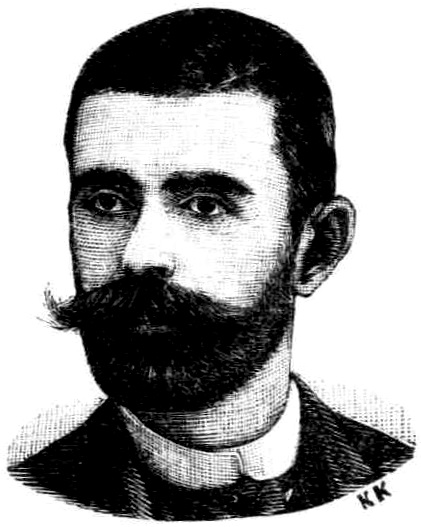
Kostis Palamas

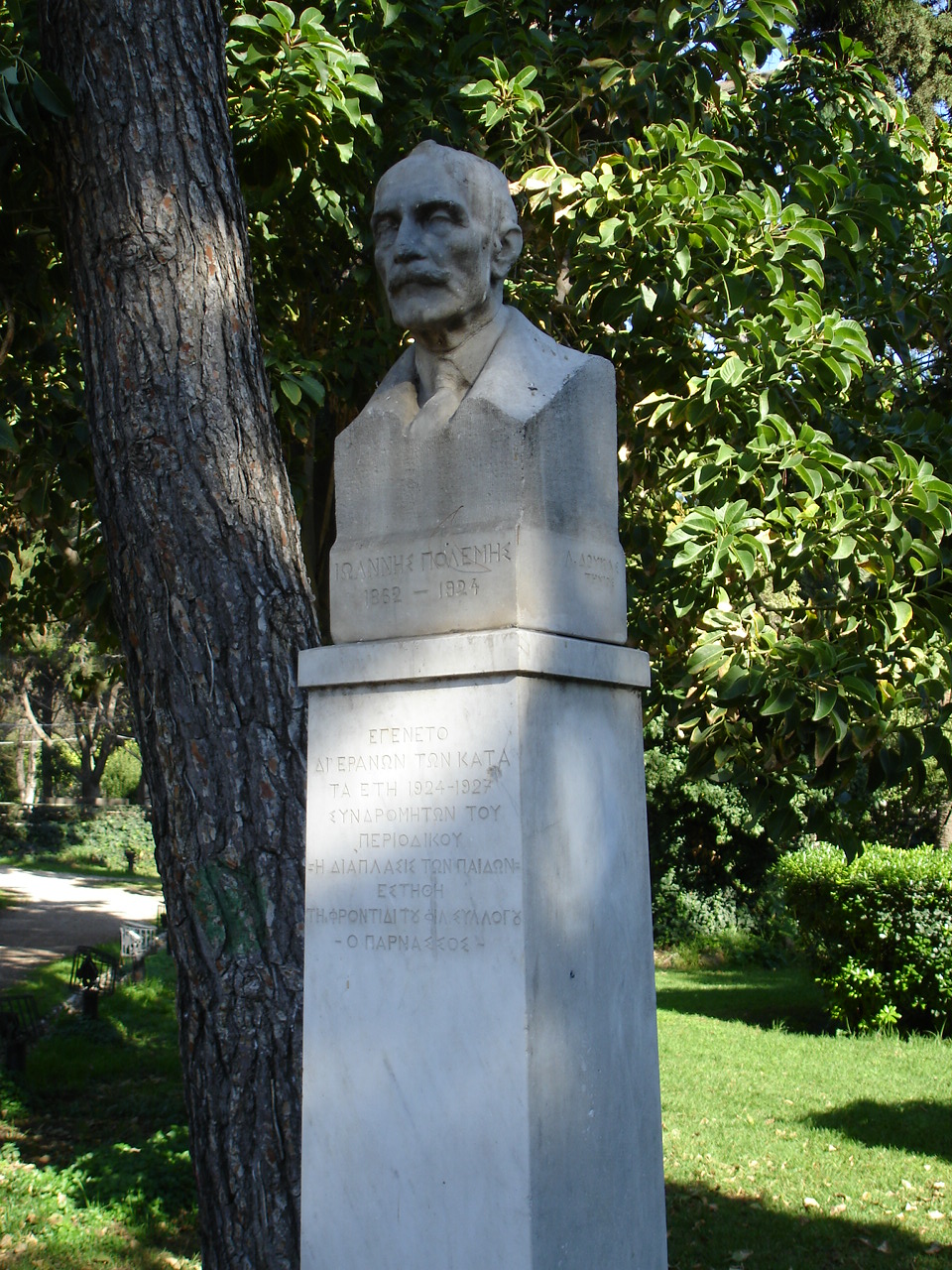
Bust of Ioannis Polemis

The term New Athenian School (Greek: Νέα Αθηναϊκή Σχολή), also known as the 1880s Generation (Γενιά του 1880) or the Palamian School (Παλαμική Σχολή) after its leading member Kostis Palamas, denotes the literary production in Athens after 1880. It was a reaction against the First Athenian School and its main aim was the use of Demotic Greek instead of Katharevousa.

The influence of Palamas led many Greek writers who were using the Katharevousa, like Aristomenis Provelengios and Jean Moréas, to abandon it and adopt the Demotic.

== General traits ==
Some general traits of the school were:

- The use of Demotic Greek
- Anti-rhetorical style and anti-romanticism
- Influence by Parnassianism and Symbolism
- Folklore and everyday-life themes

== Notable representatives ==
- Georgios Drosinis
- Ioannis Gryparis
- Kostas Krystallis
- Kostis Palamas
- Alexandros Pallis
- Ioannis Polemis
- Emmanuel Rhoides
- Georgios Souris
- Georgios Stratigis

== Notable works ==
- The Papess Joanne (1866), novel by Emmanuel Rhoides
- Vipers and Turtledoves (1878), poetry collection by Jean Moréas
- Songs of my Fatherland (1886), poetry collection by Kostis Palamas
- The King's flute (1910) by Kostis Palamas
