= First Athenian School =

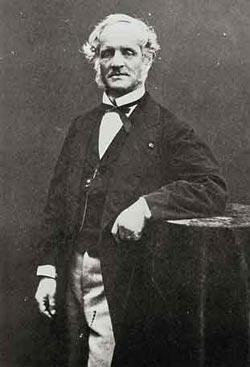
Alexandros Rizos Rangavis

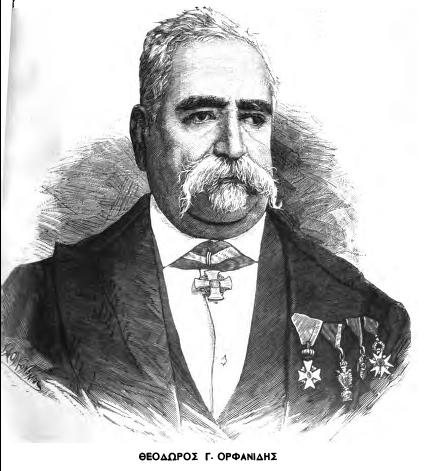
Theodoros G. Orphanides

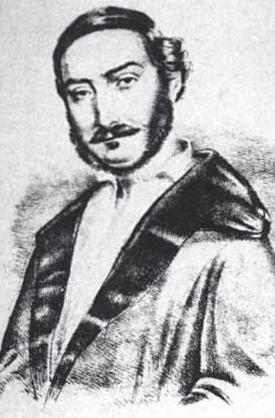
Panagiotis Soutsos

The term First Athenian School (Greek: Α΄ Αθηναϊκή Σχολή) denotes the literary production in Athens between 1830 and 1880. After Greek Independence, the basic intellectual centres of the Greek world were the Ionian Islands (with the Heptanese School) and Athens, the capital of the new Greek Kingdom. Many of the leading members of the First Athenian School were of Phanariote origin, whence it is sometimes referred to as the Phanariotic School (Φαναριωτική Σχολή).

The main element of the school was Romanticism. The New Athenian School developed as a reaction against the First Athenian School from the 1880s on.

== General traits ==
Some general traits of the school were:

- Extensive use of Katharevousa, the purest form of the modern Greek
- Influence by the French Romanticism
- Influence by the Phanariot poetry
- Rhetorical style
- Patriotic tone, themes from the Greek War of Independence

== Notable representatives ==
- Theodoros G. Orphanides
- Dimitrios Paparrigopoulos
- Alexandros Rizos Rangavis
- Panagiotis Soutsos
- Alexandros Soutsos
- Spyridon Vassiliadis
- Demetrios Bernardakis
- Dimosthenis Valavanis

== Notable works ==
- Demos and Heleni (1831) by Alexandros Rizos Rangavis
- Leander (1834), novel by Panagiotis Soutsos
- The Wedding of Koutroulis (1845), comedy by Alexandros Rizos Rangavis
- Maria Doxapatri (1857), play by Demetrios Bernardakis
- History of Modern Greek Literature (1877), historic review by Alexandros Rizos Rangavis
