= Alexandros Rizos Rangavis =

Greek man of letters, poet and statesman

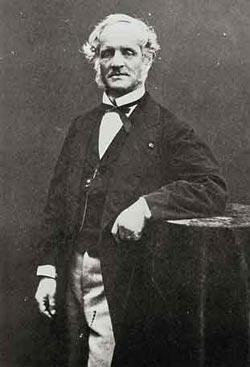
- Rangavis in 1869
- Born: Alexandros Rizos Rangavis; 27 December 1809; Constantinople, Ottoman Empire
- Died: 28 June 1892 (aged 82); Athens, Greece
- Occupations: Writer and statesman
- Writing career
- Period: 19th century

Alexandros Rizos Rangavis or Alexander Rizos Rakgabis (Greek: Ἀλέξανδρος Ῥίζος Ῥαγκαβής; French: Alexandre Rizos Rangabé; 27 December 1809 – 28 June 1892), was a Greek man of letters, poet and statesman.

== Early life ==
He was born in Constantinople to a Greek Phanariot family. He was educated at Odessa and the military school at Munich. Having served as an officer of artillery in the Bavarian army, he returned to Greece, where he held several high educational and administrative appointments. He subsequently became ambassador to Washington, D.C. (1867), Paris (1868), and Berlin (1874–1886), and was one of the Greek plenipotentiaries at the Congress of Berlin in 1878.

== Literary work ==
He was the chief representative of a school of literary men, known as the First Athenian School, whose object was to restore as far as possible the ancient classical language. He was also a founding member of the Archaeological Society of Athens.

Of his various works, Hellenic Antiquities (1842–1855, of great value for epigraphical purposes), Archaeologia (1865–1866), an illustrated Archaeological Lexicon (1888–1891), and the first History of Modern Greek Literature (1877) are of the most interest to scholars. He wrote also the following dramatic pieces: The Wedding of Koutroulis (comedy), Dukas (tragedy), The Thirty Tyrants, The Eve (of the Greek revolution); the romances, The Prince of Morea, Leila, and The Notary of Argostoli; and translated portions of Dante, Schiller, Lessing, Goethe and Shakespeare.

After his recall he lived in Athens, where he died on 28 June 1892. He had married Caroline, the daughter of James Skene of Rubislaw, near Aberdeen.

A complete edition of his philological works in nineteen volumes was published at Athens (1874–1890), and his Memoirs appeared posthumously in 1894–1895.

== Publications ==
- Ραγκαβής, Α. Ρ. (1852). Memoire sur la partie meridionale de l' ile d' Eubee / par M. Rangabe. Paris: Imprimerie Nationale.
- Ραγκαβής, Α. Ρ. (1859). Διάφορα διηγήματα και ποιήματα. Εν Αθήναις: Εκ του Τυπογραφείου Γ. Περδικομμάτη.
- Ραγκαβής, Α. Ρ. (1866). Αρχαιολογία: Ιστορία της Αρχαίας Καλλιτεχνίας, Τ. 2, Εν Αθήναις.
- Ραγκαβής, Α. Ρ. (1873). Ο πρίγκιψ του Μορέως / Le Prince de Morée, traduction du grec autorisée par l'auteur. Paris Librairie Academique.

== Publications about Rangavis ==
- Με των Μουσών τον έρωτα. Ο Αλέξανδρος Ρίζος Ραγκαβής και το νεοελληνικό θέατρο. Εκδόσεις ΙΜΣ.

== See also ==
- Modern Greek literature
- "Black Is the Night"
- First Athenian School
- Katharevousa
