= Georgios Drossinis =

Greek author and poet (1859–1951)

Georgios Drosinis
- Γεώργιος Δροσίνης
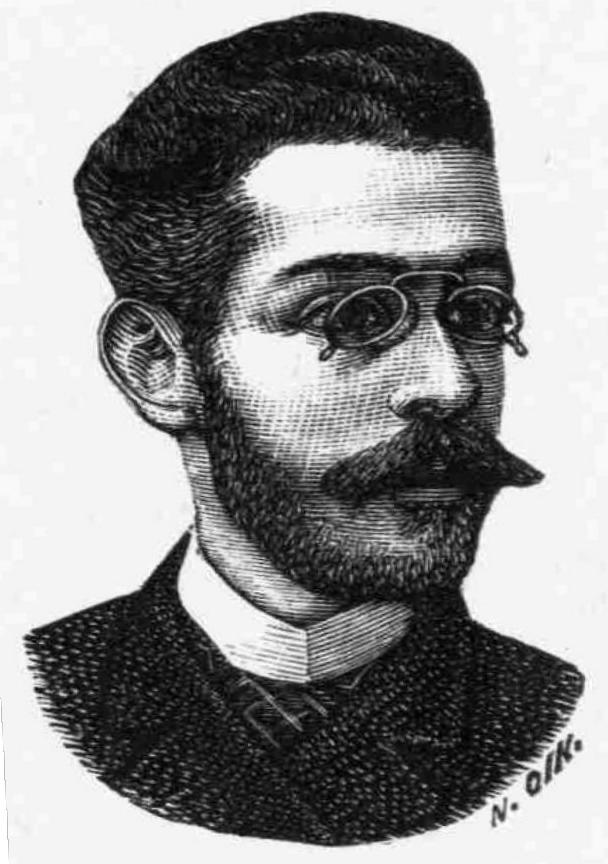
- Drosinis in 1888
- Born: 9 December 1859; Plaka, Athens, Greece
- Died: 3 January 1951 (aged 91); Kifisia, Athens, Greece
- Occupations: poet, author

Georgios Drosinis (Greek: Γεώργιος Δροσίνης; 9 December 1859 – 3 January 1951) was a Greek author, poet, scholar and an editor. He is considered to be a co-founder of the New Athenian School (Greek literary Generation of the 1880s).

== Biography ==
Georgios Drossinis was born and raised in Athens, but he came from a family from Mesolonghi which had fought in the celebrated year-long siege of the city by the Ottomans during the Greek War of Independence. He studied Philology in Athens and in Germany, but did not complete his studies. Drossinis was one of the co-founders (along with Kostis Palamas and Nikos Kampas) of the ‘1880s Generation’, which renewed modern Greek literature by reacting to already decayed romanticism. He contributed to the development and establishment of modern Greek language ("Demotic") and to the turn towards Greek folk tradition. Drossinis showed great interest in educational issues and wrote school books. From 1908, he took up important positions in the Ministry of Education. During his service, he founded school libraries, introduced standards for school hygiene and established the National Flag Day on 26 October. He also contributed to the foundation of a Home for the Blind, the Sevastopouleios Vocational School, the Hellenic Laographic Society and the compilation of the Historical Dictionary of the Greek Language. His contribution to the implementation of Prime Minister Eleftherios Venizelos’ educational programme during the 1910s was substantial. With Demetrios Vikelas, he co-founded the Society for the Dissemination of Beneficial Books (in Greek, Σ.Ω.Β.). In addition, he was editor-in-chief and director in a number of literary and educational publications (Estia magazine, To Asty, To Imerologion Tis Megalis Elladas ("Journal of Great Greece"). He worked towards the foundation of the Academy of Athens (1926) and became one of its first members. He was honoured by the Academy of Athens with the “Award for Excellence in Arts and Letters” and in 1947, he was nominated by the Greek State for the Nobel Prize in Literature.

== Poetry ==
Despite his intense action in education and publications, Georgios Drossinis is best known for his literary works. His first collection of poems was "Istoi Arachnis" (Spider Webs; 1880), a work which signalled the appearance of the New Athenian School. His poetry, which was influenced by French Parnassianism, German literature (Heinrich Heine) and Kostis Palamas, is inspired by the Greek way of life, especially Greek nature, and is characterised by its tranquillity, simplicity and intense and clear imagery. Drossinis’s most important works of poetry are the following:

- Istoi Arachnis (Spider Webs, 1880)
- Idyllia (Romances, 1884)
- Gallene (Serenity, 1902)
- Fotera Skotadia (Bright Darknesses, 1918)
- Pyrine Romfaia (Flaming Sword, 1921)
- To Moiroloi tis Omorfis (The Beauty’s Lament, 1927)
- Tha Vradyasei (It’s Going to Get Dark, 1930)
- Eipe (She Said, 1932)
- Lambades (Candles, 1947)

== Prose ==
His prose, which falls into the genre of novel of manners, is an idyllic representation of Greek living – especially rural settings – but it also shows its negative aspects, the poverty and lack of education of peasants. His most important works of prose are:

=== Novels ===
- Amaryllis (1886)
- To Votani tis Agapis (The Herb of Love, 1901)
- Ersie (1922)
- Irene (Peace, 1945)

=== Collections of short stories ===
- Agrotikai Epistolai (Peasants’ Letters, 1882)
- Diigimata kai Anamniseis (Short Stories and Memories, 1886)
- Diigimata ton Agron kai tis Polis (Short Stories of the Country and the City, 1904)

== Legacy ==
In 1940, Drossinis published his autobiography, "Skorpia Fylla tis Zois mou" (Scattered Pages of my Life).

Many of his poems have been set to music and several of his works have been translated into other languages. His Complete Works have been published by the Society for the Dissemination of Beneficial Books (Σ.Ω.Β.). Drossinis’s house in Kifisia (a northern suburb of Athens) has been renovated and belongs to the Municipality of Kifisia. The building has housed the Municipal Library of Kifisia since 1991 and the Drossinis Museum since 1997, where one can browse through a collection of the poet’s personal belongings and books. In 1997, the Society of Friends of the Drossinis Museum was founded, the aim of which is, amongst other things, to promote and spread Drossinis’s works, particularly in the education sector in Greece.
