= Ioannis Polemis =

Greek poet

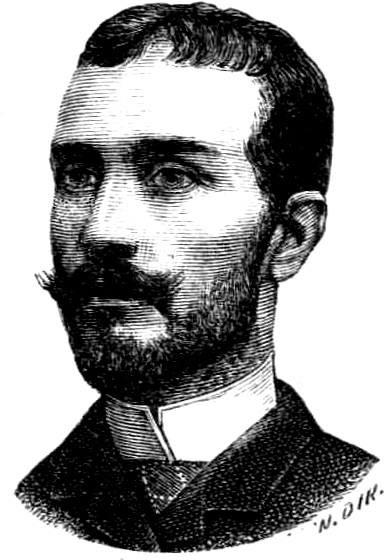
- Born: 1862; Athens, Greece
- Died: 28 May 1924 (aged 61–62)
- Occupation: Poet

Ioannis Polemis (Greek: Ιωάννης Πολέμης; 1862 – 28 May 1924) was a Greek poet.

== Life and career ==
Born in Athens, Polemis came from a historical Byzantine family. When he was in his twenties, some works of his were published in a Greek magazine. Soon, his poems and articles were published in Greek newspapers and magazines. It is believed that he was influenced by Kostis Palamas, a famous Greek poet. In 1918, Polemis took a reward for the contributions of his work. He died in 1924 in Athens due to pneumonia.
