= Georgios Roilos =

Greek painter

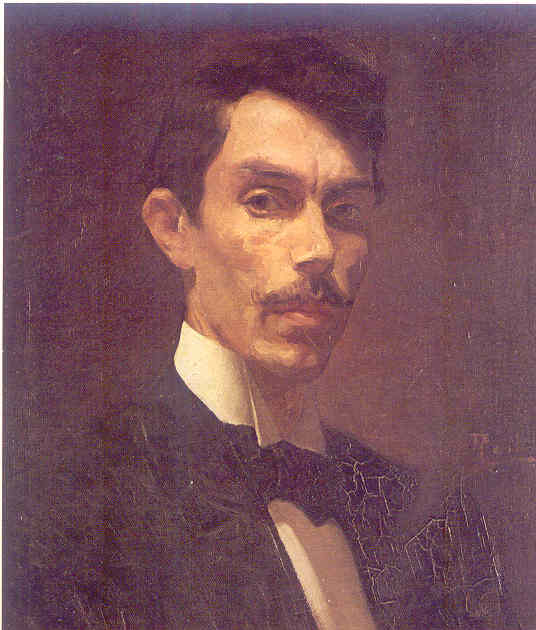
Georgios Roilos, self-portrait

Georgios Roilos (Greek: Γεώργιος Ροϊλός; 1867 – 28 August 1928) was one of the most important and influential Greek painters of the late 19th-early 20th century. He belonged to the so-called "Munich School". His major works include historical topics, portraits, and scenes of everyday life. One of his most famous paintings is “The Poets”, which depicts some of the most important representatives of the New Athenian school of poetry, also known as the Generation of 1880.

== Art studies ==
Born in Stemnitsa, Roilos began his studies at the School of Fine Arts in Athens from 1880 to 1887. In 1888 he received a scholarship to study for one year in Munich, and in 1890 went to study at the Julian Academy in Paris.

== Career ==
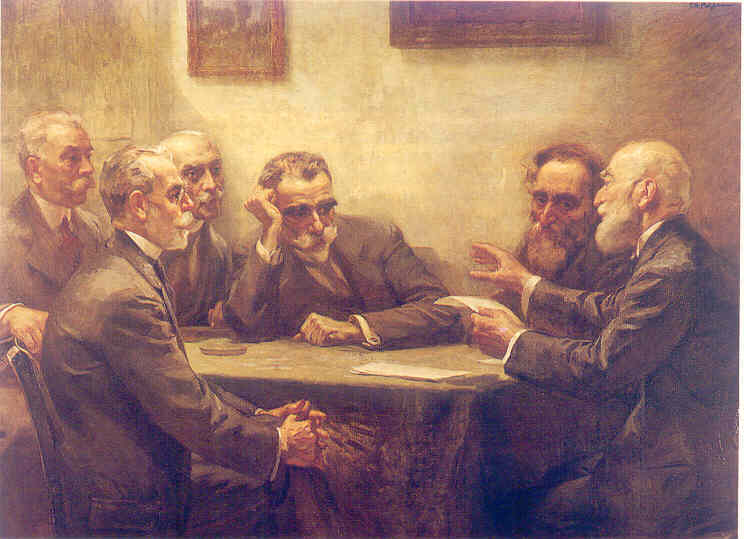
The Poets, by Roilos

In 1894 he returned to Athens and one year later, in 1895, he was appointed to the Chair of sculpture at the School of Fine Arts in Athens. In 1903 he went to London and became a member of the London Artist Association, and later to Liverpool, where he was elected a member of the city's Academy of Arts. In the period between 1910 and 1927 he was the incumbent of the Chair of Oil Painting at the School of Fine Arts in Athens. He was among the first to introduce impressionism into Greek painting, thus subverting the academic style of the "Munich School". He was a teacher and early mentor of, among others, Giorgio de Chirico, who, in his memoirs, commends the outstanding quality of Roilos's painting, which he deems superior to that of Giovanni Fattori. He died in Athens on 28 August 1928.

== Family ==
Descendant of Georgios Roilos is Panagiotis Roilos, George Seferis, Professor of Modern Greek Studies and Professor of Comparative Literature at Harvard.
