= Byzantine science =

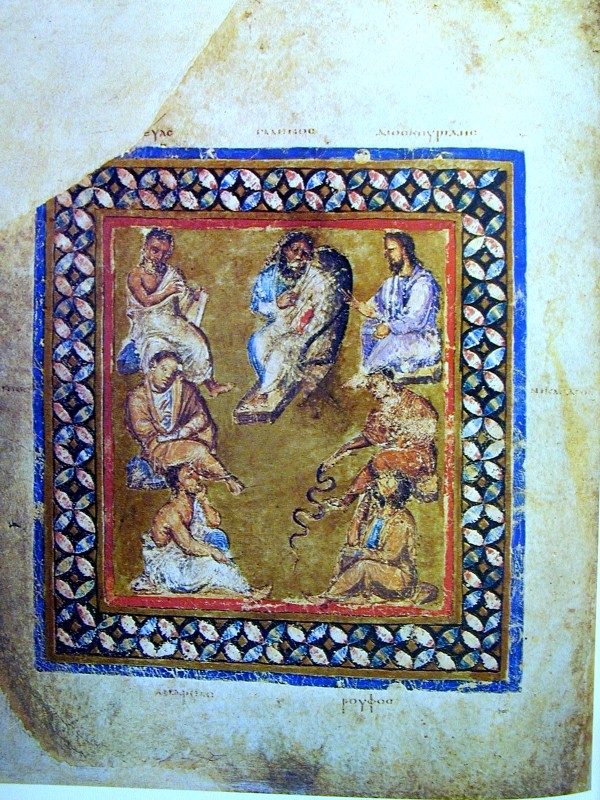
The frontispiece of the Vienna Dioscurides shows a set of seven famous physicians. The most prominent man in the picture is Galen, who sits on a folding chair.

Scientific scholarship during the Byzantine Empire played an important role in the transmission of classical knowledge to the Islamic world and to Renaissance Italy, and also in the transmission of Islamic science to Renaissance Italy. Its rich historiographical tradition preserved ancient knowledge upon which splendid art, architecture, literature and technological achievements were built. Byzantines stood behind several technological advancements.

== Classical and ecclesiastical studies ==
Byzantine science was essentially classical science. Therefore, Byzantine science was in every period closely connected with ancient-pagan philosophy and metaphysics. Despite some opposition to pagan learning, many of the most distinguished classical scholars held high office in the Church. The writings of antiquity never ceased to be cultivated in the Byzantine Empire because of the impetus given to classical studies by the Academy of Athens in the 4th and 5th centuries B.C., the vigor of the philosophical academy of Alexandria, and to the services of the University of Constantinople, which concerned itself entirely with secular subjects, to the exclusion of theology, which was taught in the Patriarchical Academy. Even the latter offered instruction in the ancient classics and included literary, philosophical, and scientific texts in its curriculum. The monastic schools concentrated upon the Bible, theology, and liturgy. Therefore, the monastic scriptoria expended most of their efforts upon the transcription of ecclesiastical manuscripts, while ancient-pagan literature was transcribed, summarized, excerpted, and annotated by laymen or clergy like Photios, Arethas of Caesarea, Eustathius of Thessalonica, and Bessarion.

Historian John Julius Norwich says that "much of what we know about antiquity—especially Hellenic and Roman literature and Roman law—would have been lost forever if it weren't for the scholars and scribes of Constantinople."

== Architecture ==
Pendentive architecture, a specific spherical form in the upper corners to support a dome, is a Byzantine invention. Although the first experimentation was made in the 200s, it was in the 6th century in the Byzantine Empire that its potential was fully achieved.

== Timekeeping ==
The Byzantines developed sophisticated portable timekeeping devices. One early Byzantine sundial incorporated interlocking gears and dials that coordinated the time with the day of the week, the months, and the phases of the moon, using planetary symbolism. Remains of this compact mechanism survive in the Science Museum in London. Additionally, several early Byzantine portable sundials have been found, including a bronze example from Aphrodisias in Asia Minor. When the emperor went on a campaign, his sleeping quarters were expected to contain a small silver timekeeping device—most likely an hourglass rather than a mechanical clock—to regulate the night watches, while a bronze timepiece was positioned outside with the bedroom staff.

== Mathematics ==
Byzantine scientists preserved and continued the legacy of the great Ancient Greek mathematicians and put mathematics in practice. In early Byzantium (5th to 7th century) the architects and mathematicians Isidore of Miletus and Anthemius of Tralles developed mathematical formulas to construct the great Hagia Sophia church, a technological breakthrough for its time and for centuries afterwards because of its striking geometry, bold design and height. In middle Byzantium (8th to 12th century) mathematicians like Michael Psellos considered mathematics as a way to interpret the world.

== Physics ==
John Philoponus, also known as John the Grammarian, was an Alexandrian philologist, Aristotelian commentator and Christian theologian, and author of philosophical treatises and theological works. He was the first who criticized Aristotle and attacked Aristotle's theory of the free fall. His criticism of Aristotelian physics was an inspiration for Galileo Galilei many centuries later; Galileo cited Philoponus substantially in his works and followed him in refuting Aristotelian physics.

In his Commentaries on Aristotle, Philoponus wrote:

But this is completely erroneous, and our view may be corroborated by actual observation more effectively than by any sort of verbal argument. For if you let fall from the same height two weights of which one is many times as heavy as the other, you will see that the ratio of the times required for the motion does not depend on the ratio of the weights, but that the difference in time is a very small one. And so, if the difference in the weights is not considerable, that is, of one is, let us say, double the other, there will be no difference, or else an imperceptible difference, in time, though the difference in weight is by no means negligible, with one body weighing twice as much as the other.

The theory of impetus was invented in the Byzantine Empire. Ship mill is an invention made by the Byzantines and was constructed in order to mill grains by using the energy of the stream of water. The technology eventually spread to the rest of Europe and was in use until c. 1800. The Byzantines knew and used the concept of hydraulics: in the 10th century the diplomat Liutprand of Cremona, when visiting the Byzantine emperor, explained that he saw the emperor sitting on a hydraulic throne and that it was "made in such a cunning manner that at one moment it was down on the ground, while at another it rose higher and was seen to be up in the air".

Paper, which the Muslims received from China in the 8th century, was being used in the Byzantine Empire by the 9th century. There were very large private libraries, and monasteries possessed huge libraries with hundreds of books that were lent to people in each monastery's region. Thus were preserved the works of classical antiquity.

== Astronomy ==
Emmanuel A. Paschos says: "A Byzantine (Roman), article from the 13th century contains advanced astronomical ideas and pre-Copernican diagrams. The models are geocentric but contain improvements on the trajectories of the Moon and Mercury." One known astronomer was Nicephorus Gregoras, who was active in the 14th century. Additionally, Byzantine scientist Symeon Seth provided a number of proofs that the earth is a sphere. He noted that when it is afternoon in Persia, it is still morning in Byzantine lands, and if the earth was not spherical, all the stars in the night sky would be visible from everywhere at the same instance, but some are seen in the north that are not seen in the south.

== Medicine ==
Medicine was one of the sciences in which the Byzantines improved on their Greco-Roman predecessors, starting from Galen. As a result, Byzantine medicine had an influence on Islamic medicine as well as the medicine of the Renaissance. The concept of the hospital appeared in Byzantine Empire as an institution to offer medical care and possibility of a cure for the patients because of the ideals of Christian charity.

Although the concept of uroscopy was known to Galen, he did not see the importance of using it to diagnose disease. It was Byzantine physicians, such as Theophilus Protospatharius, who realised the diagnostic potential of uroscopy in a time when no microscope or stethoscope existed. That practice eventually spread to the rest of Europe. The illuminated manuscript Vienna Dioscurides (6th century), and the works of Byzantine doctors such as Paul of Aegina (7th century) and Nicholas Myrepsos (late 13th century), continued to be used as the authoritative texts by Europeans through the Renaissance. Myrepsos invented the Aurea Alexandrina, which was a kind of opiate or antidote.

The first known example of separating conjoined twins happened in the Byzantine Empire in the 10th century when a pair of conjoined twins from Armenia came to Constantinople. Many years later one of them died, so the surgeons in Constantinople decided to remove the body of the dead one. The result was partly successful, as the surviving twin lived three days before dying, a result so impressive that it was mentioned a century and a half later by historians. The next case of separating conjoined twins did not occur until 1689 in Germany.

== Weaponry ==
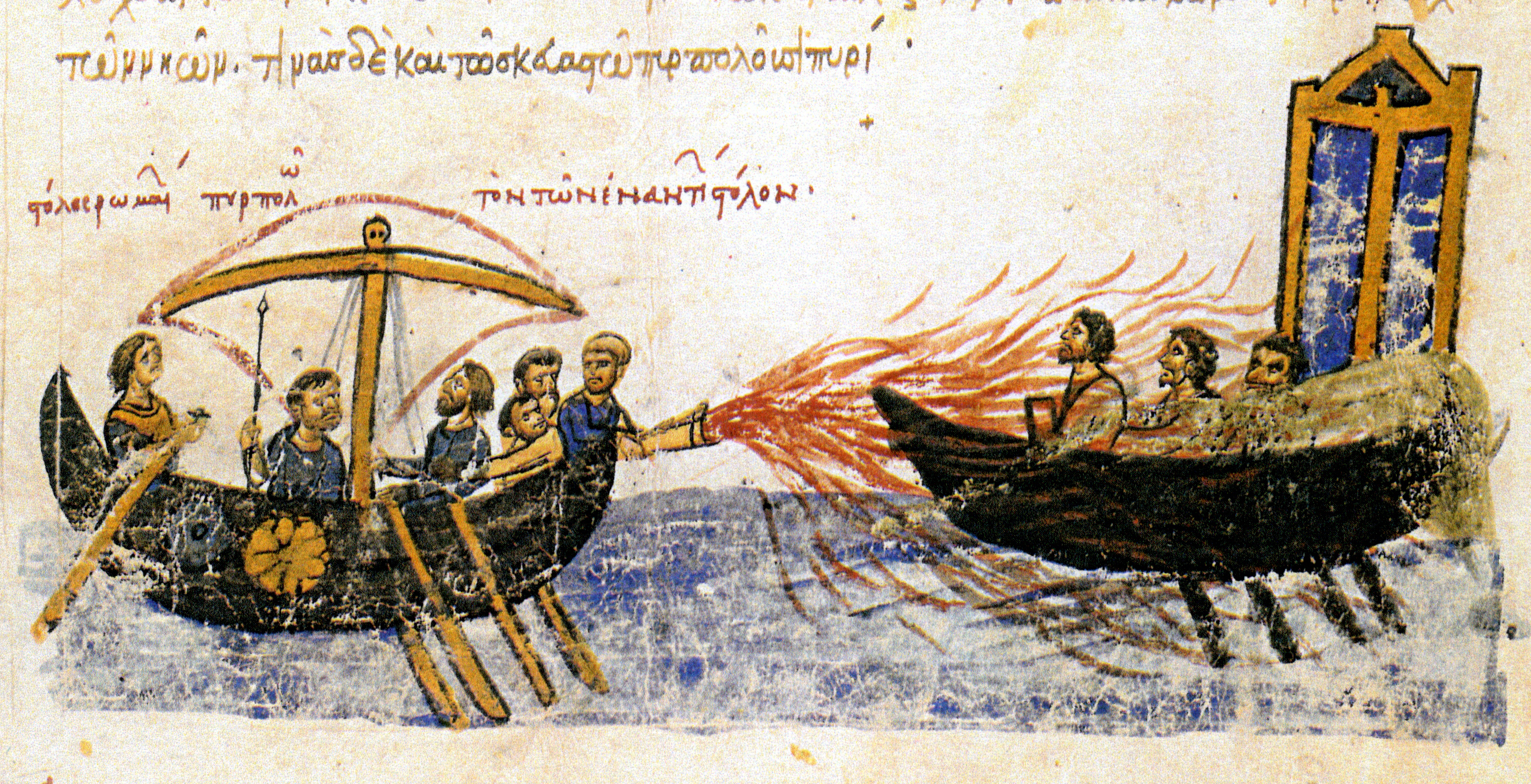
A Byzantine ship uses Greek fire against a ship of the rebel, Thomas the Slav, 821. 12th century illustration from the Madrid Skylitzes.

Greek fire was an incendiary weapon used by the Byzantine Empire. The Byzantines typically used it in naval battles to great effect as it could continue burning even on water. It provided a technological advantage and was responsible for many key Byzantine military victories, most notably the salvation of Constantinople from two Arab sieges, thus securing the empire's survival. Greek fire proper however was invented in c. 672 and is ascribed by the chronicler Theophanes to Kallinikos, an architect from Heliopolis in the former province of Phoenice. It has been argued that no single person invented the Greek fire but that it was "invented by the chemists in Constantinople who had inherited the discoveries of the Alexandrian chemical school...".

The grenade first appeared in the Byzantine Empire, where rudimentary incendiary grenades made of ceramic jars holding glass or nails were made and used on battlefields. The first examples of hand-held flamethrowers occurred in the Byzantine Empire in the 10th century, where infantry units were equipped with hand pumps and swivel tubes used to project the flame. The counterweight trebuchet was invented in the Byzantine Empire during the reign of Alexios I Komnenos (1081–1118) under the Komnenian restoration when the Byzantines used this new-developed siege weaponry to devastate citadels and fortifications. This siege artillery marked the apogee of siege weaponry before the use of the cannon. From the Byzantines, the armies of Europe and Asia eventually learned and adopted this siege weaponry.

== Byzantine and Islamic science ==
During the Middle Ages, there was frequently an exchange of works between Byzantine and Islamic science. The Byzantine Empire initially provided the medieval Islamic world with Ancient and early Medieval Greek texts on astronomy, mathematics and philosophy for translation into Arabic as the Byzantine Empire was the leading center of scientific scholarship in the region at the beginning of the Middle Ages. Later as the caliphate and other medieval Islamic cultures became the leading centers of scientific knowledge, Byzantine scientists such as Gregory Chioniades, who had visited the famous Maragheh observatory, translated books on Islamic astronomy, mathematics and science into Medieval Greek, including for example the works of Ja'far ibn Muhammad Abu Ma'shar al-Balkhi, Ibn Yunus, Al-Khazini (who was of Byzantine Greek descent), Muhammad ibn Mūsā al-Khwārizmī and Nasīr al-Dīn al-Tūsī (such as the Zij-i Ilkhani and other Zij treatises) among others.

There were also some Byzantine scientists who used Arabic transliterations to describe certain scientific concepts instead of the equivalent Ancient Greek terms (such as the use of the Arabic talei instead of the Ancient Greek horoscopus). Byzantine science thus played an important role in transmitting ancient Greek knowledge to Western Europe and the Islamic world, and also transmitting Arabic knowledge to Western Europe. Some historians suspect that Copernicus or another European author had access to an Arabic astronomical text, resulting in the transmission of the Tusi couple, an astronomical model developed by Nasir al-Din al-Tusi that later appeared in the work of Nicolaus Copernicus. Byzantine scientists also became acquainted with Sassanid and Indian astronomy through citations in some Arabic works.

A mechanical sundial device consisting of complex gears made by the Byzantines has been excavated which indicates that the Antikythera mechanism, a sort of analogue device used in astronomy and invented around the late second century BC, was utilized in the Byzantine period. J. R. Partington writes that

Constantinople was full of inventors and craftsmen. The "philosopher" Leo of Thessalonika made for the Emperor Theophilos (829–842) a golden tree, the branches of which carried artificial birds which flapped their wings and sang, a model lion which moved and roared, and a bejewelled clockwork lady who walked. These mechanical toys continued the tradition represented in the treatise of Heron of Alexandria (c. A.D. 125), which was well-known to the Byzantines.

Such mechanical devices reached a high level of sophistication and were made to impress visitors. Leo the Mathematician has also been credited with the system of beacons, a sort of optical telegraph, stretching across Anatolia from Cilicia to Constantinople, which gave warning of enemy raids and was used as diplomatic communication.

== Humanism and Renaissance ==
According to Warren Treadgold in his A History of the Byzantine State and Society:

Up to the fall of Constantinople, Byzantine scholars and artists showed at least as much knowledge and skill as those of contemporary Italy. Italian scholars were glad to learn from Byzantines like Barlaam and Bessarion, who became leading figures of the Italian Renaissance. Plethon was as innovative a thinker as any to be found in the West at his time. Byzantine art directly inspired Italian artists of the Venetian and Sienese schools. If Byzantium never developed an intellectual and artistic renaissance comparable to that of Italy, the main reason may well have been that the Turkish conquest cut Byzantine progress short. The invention of printing, which did so much to stimulate and spread Renaissance thinking in the West, came a few years too late to help the Byzantines.

During the 12th century the Byzantines produced their model of early Renaissance humanism as a renaissance of interest in classical authors, however, during the centuries before (9–12), Renaissance humanism and wanting for classical learning was prominent during the Macedonian Renaissance, and continued into what we see now as the 12th century Renaissance under the Komnenoi. In Eustathius of Thessalonica Byzantine humanism found its most characteristic expression. During the 13th and 14th centuries, a period of intense creative activity, Byzantine humanism approached its zenith, and manifested a striking analogy to the contemporaneous Italian humanism. Byzantine humanism believed in the vitality of classical civilization, and of its sciences, and its proponents occupied themselves with scientific sciences.

Despite the political, and military decline of these last two centuries, the empire saw a flourishing of science and literature, often described as the "Palaeologean" or "Last Byzantine Renaissance". Some of this era's most eminent representatives are: Maximus Planudes, Manuel Moschopoulus, Demetrius Triclinius and Thomas Magister. The academy at Trebizond, highly influenced by Persian sciences, became a renowned center for the study of astronomy, mathematics, and medicine attracted the interest of almost all scholars. In the final century of the empire, Byzantine grammarians were those principally responsible for carrying in person and in writing ancient Greek grammatical and literary studies to early Renaissance Italy, and among them Manuel Chrysoloras was involved over the never achieved union of the Churches.

== See also ==
- List of Byzantine inventions
- Byzantine scholars in Renaissance
- List of Byzantine scholars
- Science in the Middle Ages

== Sources ==
- Lazaris, Stavros, ed. (2020). A Companion to Byzantine Science. Brill. ISBN 978-90-0441460-0.
