= Byzantine medicine =

Common medical practices of the Byzantine Empire

Byzantine medicine encompasses the common medical practices of the Byzantine Empire from c. 400 AD to 1453 AD. Byzantine medicine was notable for building upon the knowledge base developed by its Greco-Roman predecessors. In preserving medical practices from antiquity, Byzantine medicine influenced Islamic medicine and fostered the Western rebirth of medicine during the Renaissance. The concept of the hospital appeared in Byzantine Empire as an institution to offer medical care and possibility of a cure for the patients because of the ideals of Christian charity.

Byzantine physicians often compiled and standardized medical knowledge into textbooks. Their records tended to include both diagnostic explanations and technical drawings. The Medical Compendium in Seven Books, written by the leading physician Paul of Aegina, survived as a particularly thorough source of medical knowledge. This compendium, written in the late seventh century, remained in use as a standard textbook for the following 800 years. This tradition of compilation continued from around the tenth century into the twentieth through the genre of medical writings known as iatrosophia.

Late antiquity ushered in a revolution in medical science, and historical records often mention civilian hospitals (although battlefield medicine and wartime triage were recorded well before Imperial Rome). Constantinople stood out as a center of medicine during the Middle Ages, which was aided by its crossroads location, wealth, and accumulated knowledge.

== Background ==
Arguably, the first Byzantine physician was the author of the Vienna Dioscurides manuscript, created circa 515 AD for Anicia Juliana, the daughter of Emperor Olybrius. Like most Byzantine physicians, this author drew his material from ancient authorities like Galen and Hippocrates, though Byzantine doctors expanded upon the knowledge preserved from Greek and Roman sources. Oribasius, arguably the most prolific Byzantine compiler of medical knowledge, frequently made note of standing medical assumptions that were proved incorrect. Several of his works, along with those of other Byzantine physicians, were translated into Latin, and eventually, during the Enlightenment and Age of Reason, into English and French.

Another Byzantine treatise, that of the thirteenth century doctor Nicholas Myrepsos, remained the principal pharmaceutical code of the Parisian medical faculty until 1651, while the Byzantine tract of Demetrios Pepagomenos (thirteenth century) on gout was translated and published in Latin by the post-Byzantine humanist Marcus Musurus, in Venice in 1517. Therefore, it could be argued that previous misrepresentations about Byzantium being simply a 'carrier' of Ancient Medical knowledge to the Renaissance are wrong. It is known, for example, that the late twelfth-century Italian physician (Roger of Salerno) was influenced by the treatises of the Byzantine doctors Aëtius and Alexander of Tralles as well as Paul of Aegina. Both Aëtius and Alexander were active during the reign of Justinian, and the former's high standing in Justinian's court facilitated his compilation and streamlining of medical information. Aëtius wrote a collection of 16 books that covered a range of topics, including pathology, drugs and medical procedures, among others. On the other hand, Alexander was a reputable medical practitioner who wrote several treatises based on his experience. His works led to some advancements in medical knowledge, some of which include the theorisation that depression could lead to higher risks of suicide, as well as his methods of dislodging foreign objects from the ear, a thousand years before the discovery of the Eustachian tube. As a result, Justinian's reign saw the preservation and compilation of medical knowledge as well as some advancements in the field of medicine.

The last great Byzantine physician was John Actuarius, who lived in the early 14th Century in Constantinople. His works on urine laid much of the foundation for later study in urology. However, from the latter 12th Century to the fall of Constantinople to the Turks in 1453, there was very little further dissemination of medical knowledge, largely due to the turmoil the Empire was facing on both fronts, following its resurrection after the Latin Empire and the dwindling population of Constantinople due to plague and war. Nevertheless, Byzantine medicine is extremely important both in terms of new discoveries made in that period (at a time when Western Europe was in turmoil), the collection of ancient Greek and Roman knowledge, and its dissemination to both Renaissance Italy and the Islamic world.

== Hospitals ==
The Byzantine Empire was one of the first empires to have flourishing medical establishments. Prior to that, the united Roman Empire had hospitals specifically for soldiers and slaves. However, none of these establishments were for the public. The hospitals in Byzantium were originally started by the church to act as a place for the poor and homeless to have access to basic amenities. Philanthropy provided the initial impulse to create hospices (xenons) and to expand these institutions into specialized medical centers (iatreons or nosokomeions). Hospitals were usually separated between men and women. Although the remains of these hospitals have not been identified by archaeologists, recordings of hospitals from the Byzantine Empire describe large buildings that had the core feature of an open hearth. The establishments of the Byzantine Empire resembled the beginning of what we now know as modern hospitals.

The first hospital was erected by Leontius of Antioch between the years 344 to 358 and was a place for strangers and migrants to find refuge. Around the same time, a deacon named Marathonius was in charge of hospitals and monasteries in Constantinople. His main objective was to improve urban aesthetics, illustrating hospitals as a major part of Byzantine cities. These early hospitals were designed for the poor. In fact, most hospitals throughout the Byzantine Empire were almost exclusively utilized by the poor. This may be due to descriptions of hospitals similar to "Gregory Nazianzen who called the hospital a stairway to heaven, implying that it aimed only to ease death for the chronically or terminally ill rather than promote recovery".

There is a debate between scholars as to why these institutions were started by the church. Whatever the case for these hospitals, they began to diffuse across the empire. Soon after, St. Basil of Caesarea developed a place, later called Basileias, which provided refuge for the sick and homeless.

Following the influx in hospitals during the mid to late fourth century, hospitals diffused across the empire. By the beginning of the fifth-century hospitals had spread across the Mediterranean to Ostia, Rome, and Hippo. However, these hospitals did not spark a proliferation of more hospitals in Byzantine Africa and Italy. Also in the fifth century, there is evidence of hospitals sprouting up in Byzantine Egypt and Syria. In Syria, the hospital described in The Life of Rabbula of Edessa documents the availability of clean clothes and sheets for its inhabitants. Additionally, Bishop Rabbula and the hospital in Edessa is known as the first hospital for the sick as well as the poor.

After the sixth century, hospitals slowly became a normal part of civic life. Following the Nika Riots, Justinian rebuilt the hospice of Samson and contributed sums of money to the establishment and maintenance of medical institutions. Evidence of construction of new hospitals originates from the Chronographia by Michael Psellos. In his book, he describes emperors Basil I, Romanos I Lekapenos, and Constantine IX building new hospitals, all of which were located in Constantinople. Outside of Constantinople, there is evidence of a hospital in Thessalonica that along with providing beds and shelter for its patients also distributed medicine to walk-in patients in the twelfth century. The 5th century Byzantine manuscript now known as the Vienna Dioscorides was still being used as a hospital textbook in Constantinople nearly a thousand years after it was created in that city; marginalia in the manuscript record that it was ordered to be rebound by a Greek nurse named Nathaniel in 1406.

Throughout the Middle Ages, the actual number of hospitals in the empire is difficult to track. Some experts estimate over 169 hospitals. These hospitals varied tremendously in size. The large hospitals, such as the one in Constantinople, was estimated to have over two hundred beds. Yet most other hospitals from this time seem to only have numbers of beds in the tens of people.

== Practices ==
The medical practices of the Byzantine Empire originated from the Greek physician Hippocrates and Roman ethnic Greek Citizen Physician Galen. Evidence of the use of ancient Greek medicinal ideas is seen through Byzantine physician's reliance on humors to diagnose illness. Byzantine physicians followed the Hippocratic Theory that the body consisted of four humors, blood, phlegm, yellow bile, and black bile. These humors were connected to particular seasons, hot or cold and dry or moist. In order to identify these humors Byzantine physicians relied heavily on Galen's works.

Byzantine diagnostic techniques centered around physician's observations of patient's pulses and urine. Also, with certain diseases, physicians may have examined excrement, breathing rate, and speech production. In the field of pulses, physicians followed the teachings of Galen, identifying pulse according to size, strength, speed, frequency of a series, and hardness or softness. The Byzantine physician John Zacharias Aktouarios states that a physician needs an exceptionally sensitive hand and a clear mind. John Zacharias Aktouarios also had a large impact on the field of urology. In Byzantine diagnostics urine was used to identify different types of illness. John Zacharias Aktouarios created a vial that separated urine into eleven different sections. The section in which the sediments or different colors appeared in the vial correlated to a different body part. For instance, if there were clouds on top of the vial this was thought to represent infections of the head.

After diagnosing the type of humor through pulse or urinary observations, physicians would then try to expunge the humor by prescribing dietary changes, medicine, or bloodletting. Another way that people were treated was through surgery. Paul of Aegina was at the forefront of surgery. He describes the operation to fix a hernia writing, "After making the incision to the extent of three fingers' breadth transversely across the tumor to the groin, and removing the membranes and fat, and the peritoneum being exposed in the middle where it is raised up to a point, let the knob of the probe be applied by which the intestines will be pressed deep down. The prominence, then, of the peritoneum, formed on each side of the knob of the probe, are to be joined together by sutures, and then we extract the probe, neither cutting the peritoneum nor removing the testicle, nor anything else, but curing it with applications used for fresh wounds." Other types of surgery occurred during this time and were described in Paul of Aegina's work, Epitome of Medicine. This work references over forty types of surgery and around fifteen surgical instruments. Additionally, there is evidence of people being hired to keep the surgical instruments clean called "akonetes". This exhibits the attention to surgery that Byzantine hospitals had.

In addition to surgery, pharmaceuticals were also a common way to cure sickness. Alexander of Tralles wrote of over six hundred drugs that he used to try and cure illnesses. His Twelve Books exemplify the use of medicine to treat all types of diseases, including what he described as "melancholy" which modern doctors would describe as depression. Some of these pharmaceuticals are still used today such as colchicine. Alexander of Tralles was one of the most important physicians of Byzantium and exemplified how medicine had a large impact on Byzantine life.

The first record of separating conjoined twins took place in the Byzantine Empire in the 900s. One of the conjoined twins had already died, so surgeons attempted to separate the dead twin from the surviving twin. The result was partly successful as the remaining twin lived for three days after separation. The next case of separating conjoined twins was recorded in 1689 in Germany several centuries later.

Byzantine diagnosis typically relied on the Hippocratic tradition. Insanity, and most importantly "Madness" was typically explained by an imbalance in the humors.

The Justinian Code, compiled during the reign of Justinian, also established several guidelines for the practice of medicine. Medical practitioners had to acquire proof of competence through examinations, and must meet certain standards of education and competency. Additionally, punishment was also meted out for malpractice.

== Christianity ==
Christianity played a key role in the building and maintenance of hospitals. Many hospitals were built and maintained by bishops in their respective prefectures. Hospitals were usually built near or around churches, and great importance was laid on the idea of healing through salvation. When medicine failed, doctors would ask their patients to pray. This often involved icons of Cosmas and Damian, patron saints of medicine and doctors.

Christianity also played a key role in propagating the idea of charity. Medicine was made, according to Oregon State University historian Gary Ferngren (professor of ancient Greek and Rome history with a speciality in ancient medicine) "accessible to all and... simple".

In the actual practice of medicine, there is evidence of Christian influence. John Zacharias Aktouarios recommends the use of Holy Water mixed with a pellitory plant to act as a way to cure epilepsy.

== See also ==
- Iranian traditional medicine
- Paul of Aegina
- Medical Compendium in Seven Books
- Islamic medicine
- Vienna Dioscurides
- Medieval medicine of Western Europe
- History of medicine
- Unani
