= Innovation in Byzantine Medicine =

Book by Petros Bouras-Vallianatos

- Cover
- Author: Petros Bouras-Vallianatos
- Original title: Innovation in Byzantine Medicine: The Writings of John Zacharias Aktouarios (c.1275-c.1330)
- Language: English
- Subject: History of medicine, Byzantine history
- Genre: Non-fiction
- Publisher: Oxford University Press
- Publication date: February 5, 2020
- Publication place: United Kingdom
- Pages: 368
- Award: The Prize for Young Historians by International Academy of the History of Science (2021)
- ISBN: 978-0198850687

Innovation in Byzantine Medicine: The Writings of John Zacharias Aktouarios (c.1275-c.1330) is a 2020 monograph by Greek author and academic Petros Bouras-Vallianatos. The book delves into the largely unexplored works of late Byzantine physician John Zacharias Aktouarios, known for his contributions to uroscopy, physiology, and pharmacology. It highlights Aktouarios' original theories, including the introduction of a new urine vial divided into eleven areas and his theory about the connection of each area with a certain part of the human body, and provides insight into the intellectual and social contexts of medical practice in the Byzantine era. Bouras-Vallianatos argues that Aktouarios' medical works were remarkably open to knowledge from outside Byzantium and displayed significant originality. The analysis of Aktouarios's treatises is based on a wide range of manuscripts and sources, shedding new light on Byzantine medical thought and its cultural exchanges with the Latin and Islamic worlds.

== Overview ==
This book offers a comprehensive examination of the medical writings of John Zacharias Aktouarios, a Late Byzantine physician. By stressing the importance of John's treatises, in the history of medieval and early modern medicine, it overturns the derogatory view that Byzantine medicine was stagnant and unoriginal. John was born around 1275 and was a well-educated practising physician in Constantinople. He wrote three major works. In his long uroscopy treatise, On Urines, he identifies a large number of urinary features from colour to sediment in an attempt to diagnose and prognosticate the patient's clinical condition. What makes his work so interesting is that he often elaborates his narration with case histories involving real patients from his clinical experience. His longest work is the Medical Epitome, which was written for the contemporary Alexios Apokaukos. The pharmacological part, in particular, presents a unique amalgamation of earlier Greek and Byzantine sources with recently introduced Arabic pharmacological lore, an excellent example of medieval scientific knowledge transfer. What makes the work quite original is that John often introduced his own recipes as an outcome of his rich practical experience. In his work On Psychic Pneuma, which is dedicated to Joseph Rhakendytes, he argued that the purified state of the psychic pneuma (the first instrument of the soul), achieved through an appropriate regimen (e.g. diet, exercise, sleep, bathing), was essential to keeping ones bodily and spiritual health in good condition, thus offering a unique psychotherapeutic approach. The analysis is based on a wide range of previously unedited manuscripts, shedding new light on Byzantine medical thought and practice in light of contemporary medical developments in the wider Mediterranean (e.g. Latin, Islamic).

== Critical reception ==
In her review, Orly Lewis (Note: of the Hebrew University of Jerusalem) acclaimed Bouras-Vallianatos for offering an in-depth study of John's writings and medical ideas and emphasising John's innovative contributions and the recognition of Byzantine medicine as a dynamic field.

Isabel Grimm-Stadelmann (Note: of the Bavarian Academy of Sciences in Munich) said "Bouras-Vallianatos offers an excellent contribution to the understanding of Byzantine medical culture" commending the book for its in-depth analysis of Byzantine medicine.

Koray Durak (Note: of the Boğaziçi University, Istanbul) appreciated how the book explores various aspects of Zacharias' work, such as uroscopy, clinical narratives, and pharmacology, and places him in the broader context of Byzantine and Mediterranean medical traditions. Durak praised Bouras-Vallianatos for being "as original, practical and accessible as the subject of his research".

Maria Mavroudi (Note: of the University of California, Berkeley) stressed the book's role in providing a comprehensive history of Byzantine medicine, especially during the Paleologan era when most Greek medical texts were written. Mavroudi acknowledged the book's contribution to dispelling the notion that Byzantine medicine was merely an uncreative imitation of ancient Greek medicine. She also emphasized that this book is one of the very few studies on premodern science that “combines good history with good philology”.

== Awards ==
Bouras-Vallianatos has been awarded for his book the 2021 Prize for Young Historians by the International Academy of the History of Science.
