= Petros Bouras-Vallianatos =

Greek historian of medicine and academic

Petros Bouras-Vallianatos FRHistS
- Born: August 1983 (age 43); Cephalonia, Greece
- Awards: The Prize for Young Historians by the International Academy of the History of Science; The Estes Prize by the American Association for the History of Medicine (2022)

Academic background
- Education: BA, MPharm, MSt, PhD
- Alma mater: King’s College London (BA, PhD), University of Athens (MPharm), University of Oxford (MSt)
- Thesis: Medical Theory and Practice in Late Byzantium: The Case of John Zacharias Aktouarios (ca. 1275 – ca. 1330)
- Doctoral advisor: Dionysios Stathakopoulos, Ludmilla Jordanova

Academic work
- Discipline: History of medicine
- Sub-discipline: History of Byzantine medicine
- Institutions: University of Edinburgh (2015–2022); University of Athens (2022–)
- Notable works: Innovation in Byzantine medicine (2020)

Petros Bouras-Vallianatos FRHistS (born August 1983) is a Greek historian of medicine who specialises in the Byzantine period. He is the author of Innovation in Byzantine Medicine.

== Biography ==
Bouras-Vallianatos was born in Cephalonia, Greece. He studied pharmacy at the National and Kapodistrian University of Athens from 2001 to 2007, followed by a bachelor's degree in ancient history at King's College London. He then studied late antique and Byzantine history and literature at the University of Oxford from 2010 to 2011, before earning a doctorate in history of medicine at King’s College London under the supervision of Dionysios Stathakopoulos and Ludmilla Jordanova in 2015.

From 2015 to 2019, Bouras-Vallianatos held a Wellcome Research Fellowship at King's College London, and in 2019 he received the permanent appointment to a Wellcome Lectureship in the history of medicine at the University of Edinburgh. In 2021, he was awarded the Prize for Young Historians by the International Academy of the History of Science for his book Innovation in Byzantine medicine. His article on "Cross-Cultural Transfer of Medical Knowledge in the Medieval Mediterranean: The Introduction and Dissemination of Sugar-Based Potions from the Islamic World to Byzantium" in Speculum was recognised as the article of the month by the Mediterranean Seminar in November 2021, and awarded the 2022 Estes Prize by the American Association for the History of Medicine.

In September 2022, Bouras-Vallianatos became associate professor of history of science at the National and Kapodistrian University of Athens. He holds the honorary fellowship in history at the University of Edinburgh, and is a fellow of the Royal Historical Society.

Bouras-Vallianatos serves as the senior editor of the series "Global Histories of Premodern Health and Healing" by the Edinburgh University Press, and co-editor-in-chief of the Journal of Late Antique, Islamic and Byzantine Studies.

== Selected publications ==
=== Authored books ===
- Innovation in Byzantine Medicine: The Writings of John Zacharias Aktouarios (c. 1275–c. 1330), Oxford: Oxford University Press, 2020. ISBN 9780198850687

=== Edited volumes ===
- (with Sophia Xenophontos) Greek Medical Literature and Its Readers: From Hippocrates to Islam and Byzantium, London: Routledge, 2018. doi:10.4324/9781351205276
- (with Barbara Zipser) Brill's Companion to the Reception of Galen, Leiden: Brill, 2019. doi:10.1163/9789004394353
- Exploring Greek Manuscripts in the Library at Wellcome Collection in London, London: Routledge, 2020. doi:10.4324/9780429470035
- (with Dionysios Stathakopoulos) Drugs in the Medieval Mediterranean: Transmission and Circulation of Pharmacological Knowledge, Cambridge: Cambridge University Press, 2023. doi:10.1017/9781009389792

=== Articles and book chapters ===
- "Clinical experience in late antiquity: Alexander of Tralles and the therapy of epilepsy", Medical History 58.3 (2014): 337–353. doi:10.1017/mdh.2014.27
- "Greek Manuscripts at the Wellcome Library in London: A Descriptive Catalogue", Medical History 59.2 (2015): 275. doi:10.1017/mdh.2015.6
- "Galen's reception in Byzantium: Symeon Seth and his refutation of Galenic theories on human physiology", Greek, Roman, and Byzantine Studies 55.2 (2015): 431–469.
- "Modelled on Archigenes theiotatos: Alexander of Tralles and his Use of Natural Remedies (physika)", Mnemosyne 69.3 (2016): 382–396. doi:10.1163/1568525X-12341857
- "Reading Galen in Byzantium: The fate of 'Therapeutics to Glaucon'", in Greek Medical Literature and its Readers: From Hippocrates to Islam and Byzantium, eds. P. Bouras-Vallianatos and S. Xenophontos, London: Routledge, 2018: 180–229
- "Galen in Byzantine Medical Literature", in Brill's Companion to the Reception of Galen, eds. P. Bouras-Vallianatos and B. Zipser, Leiden: Brill, 2019: 86–110. doi:10.1163/9789004394353_006
- "Galen in Late Antique medical handbooks", in Brill's Companion to the Reception of Galen, eds. P. Bouras-Vallianatos and B. Zipser, Leiden: Brill, 2019 doi:10.1163/9789004394353_004
- "Cross-cultural Transfer of Medical Knowledge in the Medieval Mediterranean: The Introduction and Dissemination of Sugar-based Potions from the Islamic World to Byzantium", Speculum 96.4 (2021): 963–1008. doi:10.1086/715838
- "Diagrams in Greek Medical Manuscripts", in The Diagram as Paradigm: Cross-Cultural Approaches, eds. J. Hamburger, D. Roxburgh, and L. Safran, Washington, DC: Dumbarton Oaks Research Library and Collection, 2022: 287–329
- "Breastmilk as a Therapeutic Agent in Ancient and Early Byzantine Medical Literature", in Breastfeeding and Mothering in Antiquity and Early Byzantium, eds. S. Constantinou and A. Skouroumouni-Stavrinou, Abingdon: Routledge, 2023: 105–129. doi:10.4324/9781003265658-6
- (with Fabian Käs) "Treating with minerals in the Middle Ages: the rare substance mūmiyāʾ (pitch-asphalt) and its medicinal uses in Byzantium", Medical History (2024): 1–14. doi:10.1017/mdh.2024.25
- "Examining a Previously Unknown Pharmacological Potpourri: A New Witness to Late Byzantine Therapeutics and Its Expansion through Appropriations from the Islamicate and Latin Medical Traditions", in A Key to Locked Doors, eds. F. Käs, J. Kley, F. Hedderich. Leiden: Brill, 2024: 450–504. doi:10.1163/9789004705883_023
