= Iatrosophist =

Ancient title designating a professor of medicine

Iatrosophist (Ancient Greek: ἰατροσοφιστής, Latin: iatrosophista) is an ancient title designating a teacher of medicine. It comes from Ancient Greek: ἰᾱτρός 'doctor' and Ancient Greek: σοϕιστής 'learned person'. People who have been referred to by the title include:

- Adamantius
- Cassius Iatrosophista
- Gessius of Petra
- Magnus of Nisibis
- Oribasius
- Palladius (physician)
- Paul of Aegina
- Severus Iatrosophista
- Zeno of Cyprus

== See also ==
- Iatrosophia
