= Philaretos =

Philaretos or Philaretus is a masculine Greek given name meaning "lover of virtue". Notable people with the name include:

- Philaretus (medical writer)
- Saint Philaretos, 8th-century Anatolian saint
- Philaretos Brachamios (died c. 1087), Byzantine general of Armenian origin
- Philaretus, pseudonym of Arnold Geulincx (17th century)

== See also ==
- Filaret (disambiguation)
- Filarete
