= Adamantius (physician) =

5th-century Greek physician and writer

Adamantius (Ancient Greek: Ἀδαμάντιος) was an ancient physician, bearing the title of iatrosophist (ἰατρικῶν λόγων σοφιστῆς; broadly, "professor of medicine"). Little is known of his personal history, except that he was Jewish by birth, and that he was one of those who fled from Alexandria at the time of the expulsion of the Jews from that city by the Patriarch Cyril of Alexandria in 415. He went to Constantinople, was persuaded to convert to Christianity, apparently by Archbishop Atticus of Constantinople, and then returned to Alexandria.

Adamantius is the author of a Greek treatise on physiognomy (φυσιογνωμονικά) in two books. It is still extant, and borrows in a great measure (as Adamantius himself confesses) from Polemon's work on the same subject. It is dedicated to "Constantius", who is supposed by Fabricius to be the same Constantius (i.e. Constantius III) who married Placidia, the daughter of Theodosius the Great, and who reigned for seven months in conjunction with the Emperor Honorius. It was first published in Greek in Paris in 1540. Several of his medical prescriptions are preserved by Oribasius and Aëtius.

Another of Adamantius' works, Περὶ Ἀνέμων (Lat. De Ventis), is quoted by the Scholiast to Hesiod, and an extract from it is given by Aëtius Amidenus. The text was published in 1864 by Valentin Rose in Anecdota Graeca.
