= Gilles de Corbeil =

French physician and teacher

Gilles de Corbeil (Latin: Egidius de Corbolio or Egidius Corboliensis; also Aegidius) was a French royal physician, teacher, and poet. He was born in approximately 1140 in Corbeil and died in the first quarter of the 13th century. He is the author of four medical poems and a scathing anti-clerical satire, all in Latin dactylic hexameters.

== Life and works ==
=== Education and De compositorum medicaminum ===
Gilles de Corbeil was born in Corbeil-Essonnes. He studied at the Schola Medica Salernitana, absorbing its theories and practices and becoming a teacher himself. He praises his teachers Romuald Guarna and Peter Musandinus (in turn the student of Bartholomew of Salerno) in his long poem (four books and 4,663 verses) of ca. 1194 on Salernitan drug therapy, De laudibus et virtutibus compositorum medicaminum. He complains, however, of the school's degeneration after the sack of Salerno in 1194 by Henry VI, Holy Roman Emperor, and in the same poem he criticizes its "granting medical degrees, and consequently a license to lecture, to unlearned and inexperienced youths."

=== Paris and Montpellier ===
He returned to Paris between ca. 1180 and 1194, becoming a canon and the court physician to Philip II of France. He proudly presented himself as a pioneer of academic medicine in France, upholding the prestige of the Salernitan medicine over rivals such as the Montpellier school and the "empiric" Rigord. The epilogue to De urinis is a particularly bitter denunciation of Montpellier, its vain contentiousness and obliviousness to true science (Latin: Monspessulanicus error), and even its people; one Medieval commentator explains this in terms of an unhappy visit to the city by Gilles. Gilles of Corbeil is the only teacher namely known of the University of Paris where he became a magister in the end of the 12th century.

=== Poems for students: De urinis and De pulsibus ===
His brief poems De urinis (352 verses on uroscopy) and De pulsibus (380 verses on Galenic pulsology), based on treatises by Theophilus Protospatharius by way of the Articella, were intended as mnemonic aids for his students to memorize, reflecting his preoccupation with pedagogy. They became didactic classics and were widely studied, copied, and commented upon.

=== De signis et symptomatibus egritudinum ===
This poem of 2,358 verses, not printed until 1907, deals with the signs and symptoms of humoral excess and diseases (organized from head to foot), proceeding to "sections on gynecological disorders and on whole-body diseases such as arthritis, leprosy, and fevers."

=== Ierapigra ad purgandos prelatos ===
His Laxative for Purging Prelates (Latin: Ierapigra ad purgandos prelatos; a Salerno glossary explains yerapigra literally as "sacred and bitter medicine," sacrum amarum, from Greek ἱερός, often used for a special pharmacological recipe, and πικρός), a satire in nine books and 5,929 verses, was discovered in 1837 among manuscripts deriving from the library of Pierre Pithou. It particularly targets Guala Bicchieri but takes aim more generally at the abuses prevalent among ecclesiastical officials. In a prologue, the poet invokes, not a Muse, but a pope (apparently Innocent III), from whom he hopes to receive the antidote that can cure the morally sick prelates.

== Editions ==
- Johann Ludwig Choulant, Aegidii Corboliensis Carmina Medica, Leipzig, 1826 (online)
- Camille Vieillard, L'urologie et les médecins urologues dans la médecine ancienne: Gilles de Corbeil, Paris, 1903 (online)
- Valentin Rose, Egidii Corboliensis Viaticus de signis et symptomatibus aegritudinum, Teubner, 1907, editio princeps (online)
- Dieter Scheler, Die Ierapigra ad purgandos prelatos des Egidius von Corbeil, Teildruck Phil. Diss. Würzburg, Bochum, 1972

== Translations ==
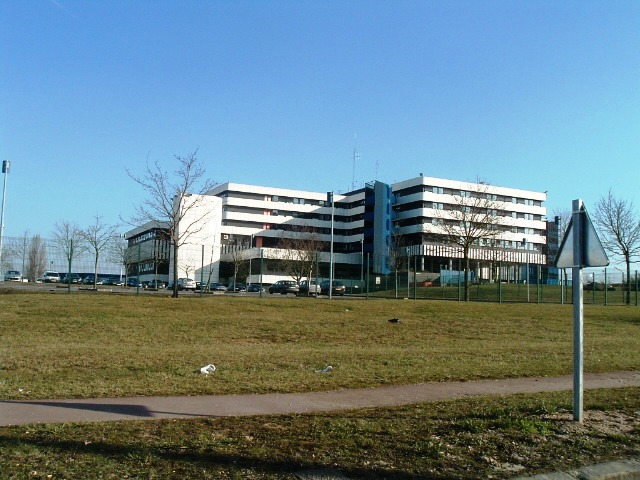
The Gilles de Corbeil Hospital in Corbeil-Essonnes

- A text from De urinis, translated by Michael R. McVaugh (originally in Sourcebook in Medieval Science, ed. Edward Grant, Harvard University Press, 1974, pp. 748–50), is reprinted in Medieval Medicine: A Reader, ed. Faith Wallis, University of Toronto Press, 2010, pp. 256-258
