= Iatrosophia =

Genre of Greek medical literature

Iatrosophia (Ancient Greek: ιατρoσóφια, literally 'medical wisdom') is a genre of Greek medical literature, originating in Byzantium. It comprises medical handbooks containing recipes or therapeutic advice, but the term can also be used of orally transmitted medical knowledge.

== Etymology ==
The term comes from Ancient Greek: ἰᾱτρός 'doctor' and Ancient Greek: σοϕία 'knowledge', and gave rise to the term Iatrosophist (Ancient Greek: ἰατροσοφιστής, Latin: iatrosophista), denoting a professor of medicine (from Ancient Greek: ἰᾱτρός 'doctor' and Ancient Greek: σοϕιστής 'learned person').

== Origins and development ==
It is thought that the iatrosophia genre arose in Byzantine hospitals, as compendia of recipes and therapeutic advice. The earliest known examples date from perhaps as early as the tenth century CE, but they survive in large numbers only from the fifteenth century onwards. After the fall of Byzantium, the iatrosophist tradition was maintained by Greek Orthodox monasteries and in secular, Greek-speaking parts of the Ottoman Empire into the early twentieth century. The texts drew on earlier Greek and Latin medical writing by Hippocratic writers such as Dioscorides and Galen, and, more importantly, later Byzantine authors (writing around the fourth to seventh centuries CE) such as Oribasius, Aetios of Amida, Alexander of Tralles and Paulus Aegineta. From the tenth century, influence from Arabic medicine (itself previously influenced by Greek medical writing) is also possible. Yet it is also clear that writers in this genre continually updated and adapted their texts on the basis of new information and experience.

== Modern research ==
Although nineteenth- and twentieth-century historians of medicine viewed iatrosophia texts as corrupt and degraded forms of more prestigious Classical medicine, recent work has emphasised that in their historical context they were intellectually valid works. Some researchers have even argued that some of the recipes in iatrosophia texts reflect clinically effective pharmacology.

Few texts in this genre have so far been edited or translated, surviving only in manuscript form. One survey of 700 Ottoman-era Greek medical manuscripts found that 45% were iatrosophia.
