= A. pedunculata =

A. pedunculata may refer to:

- Azorella pedunculata, a member of the genus Azorella
- Acronychia pedunculata, a large shrub or small tree found in Asian tropical forests
- Aeginetia pedunculata, a member of the genus Aeginetia in the family Orobanchaceae
