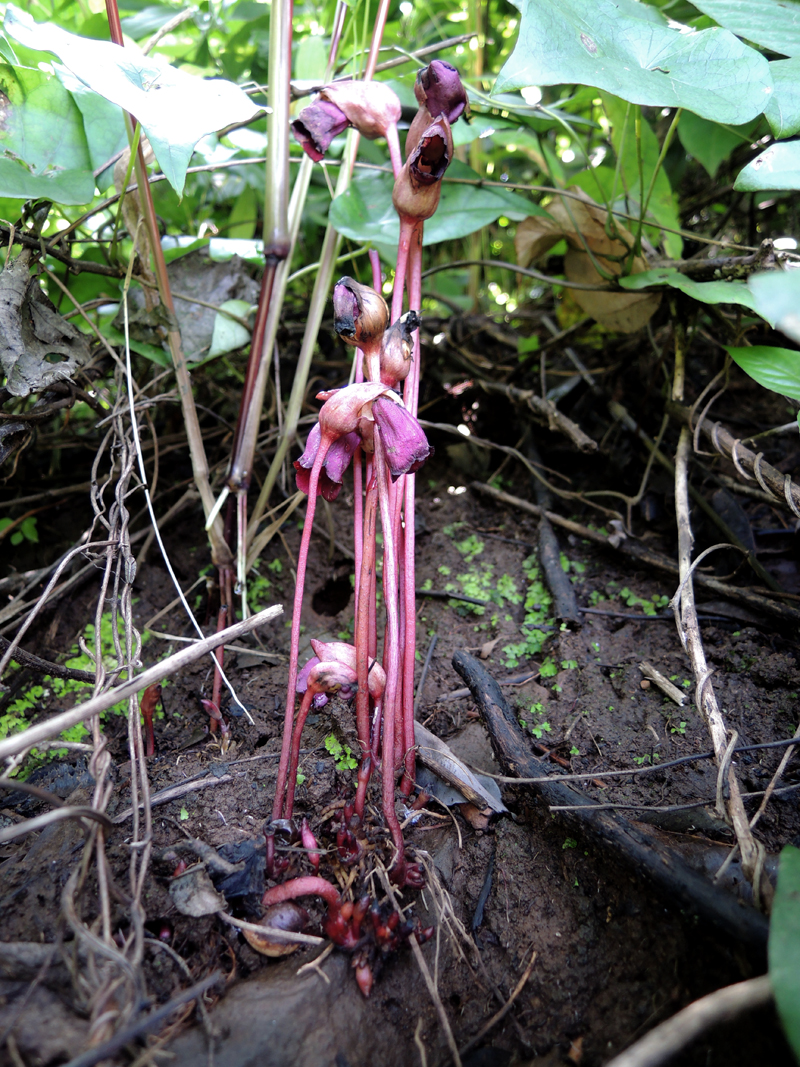
- Forest ghost flower, Aeginetia indica

Scientific classification
- Kingdom: Plantae
- Clade: Tracheophytes
- Clade: Angiosperms
- Clade: Eudicots
- Clade: Asterids
- Order: Lamiales
- Family: Orobanchaceae
- Genus: Aeginetia
- Species: A. indica

Binomial name
- Aeginetia indica Linnaeus

= Aeginetia indica =

Species of flowering plant

Aeginetia indica, commonly known as Indian broomrape or forest ghost flower, is a holoparasitic herb or root parasite of the plant family Orobanchaceae. It grows in moist deciduous and semi-evergreen forests of tropical and subtropical Asia and New Guinea. It parasitises plants of the families Cannaceae, Commelinaceae, Cyperaceae, Juncaceae, Poaceae, and Zingiberaceae.

In many regions, including the Nepal Eastern Himalayas, Aeginetia indica is used for medicinal and ritual purposes. For example, the entire plant is placed in shrines or on altars during the Teej festival as a symbol of Shiva and Parvati.
