= Uroscopy =

Historical medical practice of examining urine for disease

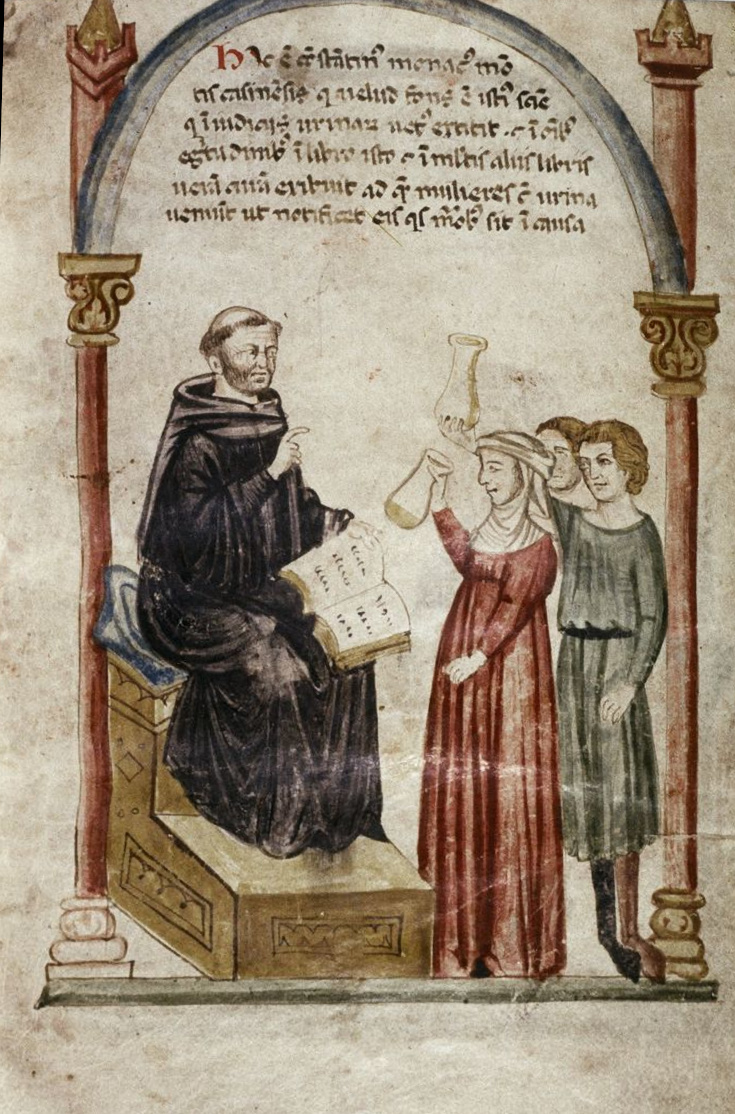
People showing a sample of urine to the physician Constantine the African.

Uroscopy is the historical medical practice of visually examining a patient's urine to diagnose diseases or medical conditions. It is an ancient technique that involves the analyzing the color, odor, and sometimes composition of urine. It was widely used by physicians to assess a patient's health, with different colors or characteristics of urine thought to correspond to specific illnesses.

The first records of uroscopy as a method for determining symptoms of an illness date back to the 4th millennium BC, and became common practice in Classical Greece. After reaching medical predominance during the Byzantine Era & High Middle Ages, the practice eventually was replaced with more accurate methods during the Early Modern Period, with uroscopy being considered inadequate due to the lack of empirical evidence and higher standards of post-Renaissance medicine.

In modern medicine, visual examination of a patient's urine may provide preliminary evidence for a diagnosis, but is generally limited to conditions that specifically affect the urinary system such as urinary tract infections, kidney and bladder issues, and liver failure.

== History ==
Uroscopy is derived from "Uroscopia," which originates from the Greek word "ouron" meaning "urine," and "skopeo," translating to "behold" or "examine." Records of urinalysis for uroscopy date back as far as 4000 BC, originating with Babylonian and Sumerian physicians. At the outset of the 4th century BC Greek physician Hippocrates hypothesized that urine was a "filtrate" of the four humors, and limited the possible diagnoses resulting from this method to issues dealing with the bladder, kidneys, and urethra. This theory was born from the notion that urine was the liquid residue which moved the humors through the body, and once it had, the urine would exit through the bladder. This implied that because the urine contained a mixture of all four humors, a physician could examine it to accurately decipher the combination of those humors in the body. Another Greek physician, Galen, then refined the idea down to urine being a filtrate of only blood, and not of black bile, yellow bile, or phlegm. Therefore, the development and rapid propagation of uroscopy as the primary procedure for diagnosis hinged on the idea that disease was a result of a humoral imbalance.

From the 4th to 7th centuries, several authors including Oreibasios, Aetios of Amida, Magnus of Emesa, and Paulus Aegineta, began teaching the practice of uroscopy. However, it soon became evident that a treatise including all of the basic information about the method was necessary. Byzantine medicine built on these ideas. Since it was rooted in Greco-Roman antiquity, the application and study of uroscopy continued – eventually becoming the primary form of ailment diagnosis.

Byzantine physicians created some of the foundational codifications of uroscopy, with the most well-known example being a 7th-century guide on uroscopic methods, and the first text solely dedicated to the study of urine: Theophilus Protospatharius's De Urines. This work became widely popular and accelerated the rate at which uroscopy spread throughout the Mediterranean. Other notable sources on the practice included Gilles de Corbeil's Carmen de Urinis and Isaac Israeli ben Solomon's Liber Urinarum (originally Kitāb al-Bawl). The latter begins with a theory of digestion and explains how changes in urine reflect internal bodily processes. It also includes guidelines for collecting and interpreting urine samples in clinical diagnosis. These works were especially successful due to their engagement with the Articella, a collection of treatises that established a foundation for medical teaching from the 12th to 16th centuries. Over time, these Byzantine works inspired further interpretation by other prominent culture's scholars (like Isaac Israeli's urine-hue classification chart), though greater propagation led to a widened application of uroscopy and eventually uroscopic diagnoses of non-urinary related diseases and infections became standard.

Pivotal in the spread of uroscopy, Constantine the African's Latin translations of Byzantine and Arab texts inspired a surge in uroscopic interest specifically in Western Europe throughout the High Middle Ages. However, from about 1375 onward, the translation of uroscopic texts from Latin into English ushered in a time in which anyone could access uroscopic knowledge. This is significant, because at a time when demand for this procedure was unprecedented and constantly growing, the public turned to less qualified physicians in lieu of using university-trained practitioners (both rare and expensive).

For instance, in mid 15th century Essex, a man named John Crophill worked as both a bailiff and a healer. He was most likely self-taught and certainly not university-trained; however, he wrote books, which included two texts on urine, that were accessible to the general public, rather than the educated few.

Despite this popularization, the practice of uroscopy was still mostly centered around the principals Hippocrates and Galen first postulated, although aided by Byzantine interpretations that were further disseminated during this period in works by French physicians of the era Bernard de Gordon and Gilles de Corbeil.

The Schola Medica Salternitana, or, The Medical School of Salerno (founded in the 9th century), was the first medical school in Western Europe and became a center of knowledge especially in regard to uroscopy. The practice become one of the most standard diagnostic tests at the institution, which drew from the medical legacy of the Greeks and Romans, as well as the Arabs.

Gilles de Corbeil, who attended the school, eventually became the royal physician to King Phillippe-Auguste of France and continued to build on the uroscopic teachings of Protospatharius and Isaac Judaeus in his own writing. In his work, Gilles is attributed with connecting at least twenty various types of urine to bodily conditions and was further credited with writing several medical texts in prose, including "Carmina de Urinarum Indiciis," or, "Songs on Urinary Judgment." His works sought to integrate his and other scholars' theories about urine in a lyrical capacity to make it easier for medical students to memorize.

Despite the color of the urine being the foremost indicator of potential symptoms, a trained medieval physician would combine his medical knowledge and skill with the visual analysis of a urine sample to reach the most accurate diagnosis. Therefore, the discovery that several uroscopic examinations were carried out remotely (the patient would send a sample to their physician) came as a surprise for many medieval scholars.

For instance, Isaac Israeli firmly opposed this idea of practicing uroscopic examinations without the patient present. In fact, he openly criticized scholars and physicians who did this in one of his treaties where he writes: "Fools who would base prophecies on it, without seeing the patient, and determine what disease is present, and whether the patient will die, and other foolishness."

University trained physicians emphasized the importance of practicing bedside medicine to give full physical examinations that would produce a more accurate diagnosis. It also provided the opportunity for practitioners to communicate face-to-face to ensure their patients are being honest about their symptoms. There is documentation that in some instances, patients would sent in fake samples of white wine or any yellow substance reminiscent of urine to evade diagnosis. Additionally, the use of bedside medicine provided physicians a platform in which to boast their robust knowledge and skill to set themselves apart from their medical rivals. Conducting the examination process around the patient, their family, friends, and servants was a simply, yet effective method to increase one's status as a physician. Therefore, they often treated uroscopic examinations like a performance, dramatically holding the sample up to the light and pondering a diagnosis.

Joannes Zacharias Actuarius (1275–1328), chief physician to the Byzantine Empire, advanced the practice of uroscopy by focusing on urinary sediments and their diagnostic significance. Building on the four humors theory, he associated urine with the third digestion, considering yellow urine a sign of health, while darker urine indicated bodily imbalance. Actuarius believed that sediments formed due to the body's elements separating by their densities, with heavy sediment signaling lower body ailments and bubbles on the surface suggesting head issues. He also emphasized the importance of examining urine layers, warning against relying solely on urine for diagnosis. To refine the process, Actuarius modified the matula (urine flask), improving its ability to display these layers and sediments for more accurate diagnostic predictions.

The practice of uroscopy was upheld as the main standard of medical diagnosis until the beginning of the 16th century, when influence from cultural movements like the Renaissance inspired the re-examination of its methods, both to re-evaluate its effectiveness and explore new applications. During this period, a lack of empirical evidence supporting uroscopy and the introduction of new medical practices developed using the scientific method contributed to its gradual decline among licensed physicians. Early modern doctors, like the Swiss medical pioneer Paracelsus, began researching more empirically qualified approaches to diagnosis and treatment – an integral part of the Medical Renaissance and its redefining how we look at medicine —which only further hastened the decline of uroscopy. Since the beginning of the 17th century the practice has been largely considered unverifiable and unorthodox, and became a subject of satire (including multiple satirical references in the plays of Shakespeare). It was still practiced by "unlicensed practitioners" by popular demand up until around the beginning of the 19th century.

Though uroscopy is no longer popular in modern medicine, examples of its preliminary diagnostic utility still exist in simplified and empirically proven forms.

Incidentally, as the decline of uroscopy continued a new form of divination emerged from its remnants in "Uromancy" – the analysis of one's urine for fortune-telling or state-reading purposes. Although uromancy initially gained interest in the 18th and 19th centuries, it is rarely practiced and unknown to most in the present era.

== Procedures and conventions ==
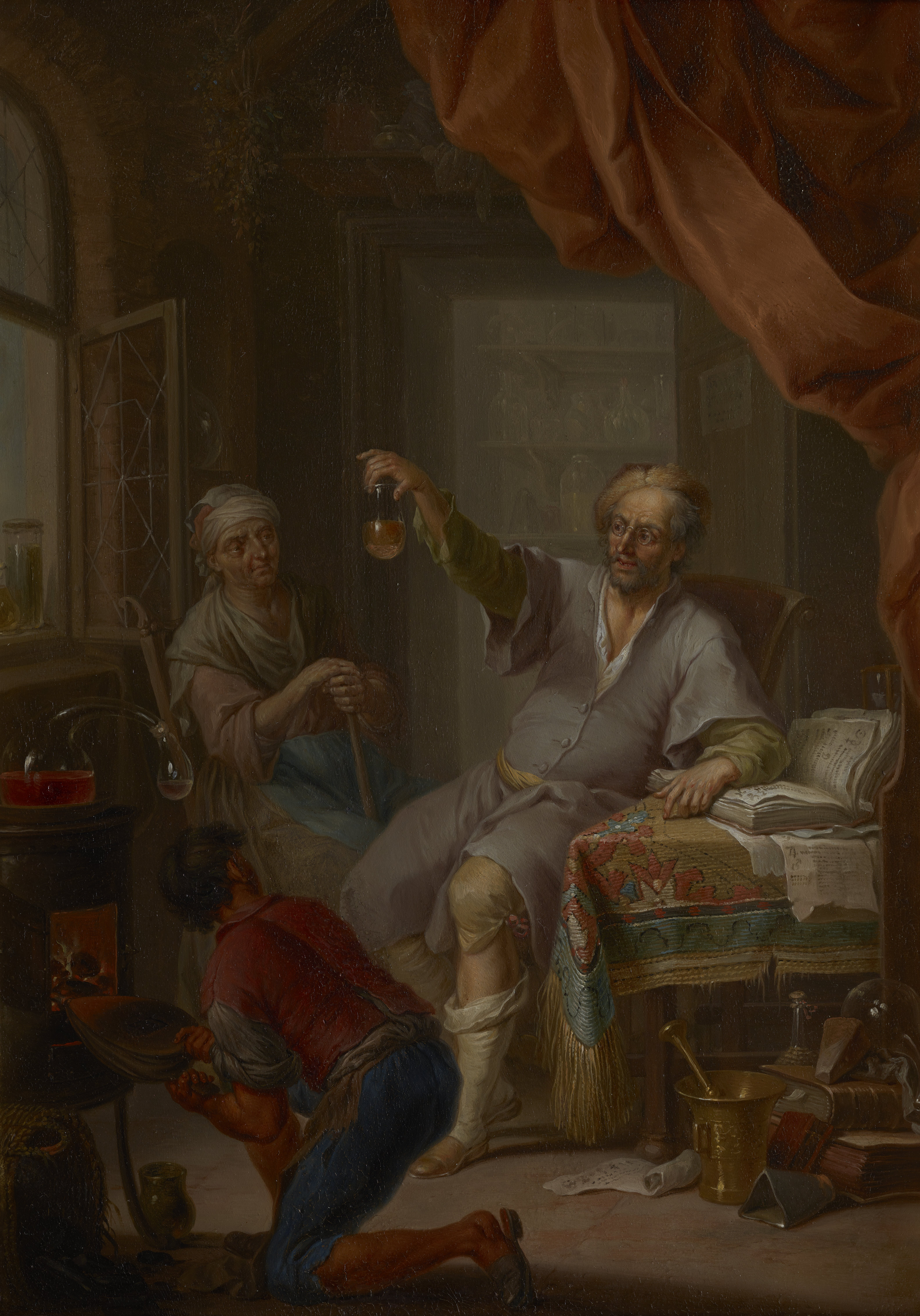
The Medical Alchemist vt. The Uroscopy by Franz Christoph Janneck (1703–1761), (Science History Institute)

Practitioners of uroscopy are referred to as uroscopists. In the era in which uroscopy was a popular way of thinking, one of the major benefits was the lack of surgical operations, lending itself to the most conservative of adherents to the Hippocratic Oath.

=== Matula (flask) ===
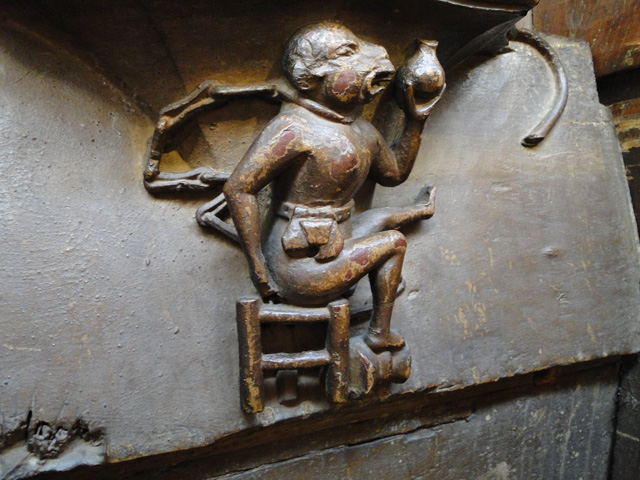
Monkey conducting a uroscopic examination

A uroscopy flask, also known as a "matula", is a piece of transparent glass with a thin neck at the top, and a small opening for the patient to urinate in. The bottle is known as a "maftul" in Arabic, which translates to "twisted" due to the shape of the flask's neck. The translucent quality of the glass is imperative as colorations, along with any deformations, may lead to a misdiagnosis. The bladder-shaped vessel was introduced by Gilles de Corbeil and became a lasting symbol of uroscopy and general medical practice throughout the Middle Ages. Corbeil believed that different parts of the flask correlated to certain parts of the body. Satirists, who mocked the practice for its intent focus on urine as a legitimate medical tool, mocked practitioners by evoking the symbol of the matula. For instance, images of monkeys conducting a uroscopic examination can be found in manuscript marginalia, as well as in an early 14th century stained glass window at York Minster Cathedral.

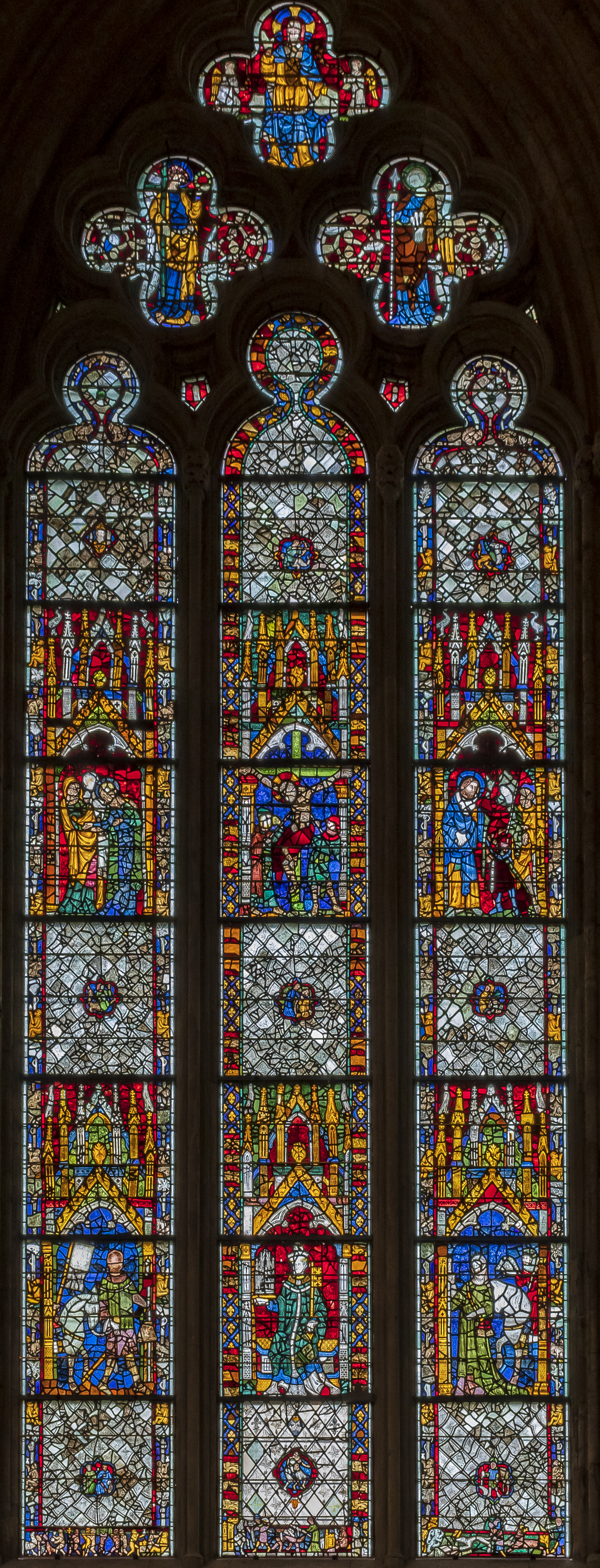
York Minster Stained Glass Window

=== Urine wheel ===
Uroscopy Wheel

The uroscopy wheel is a diagram that linked the color of urine to a particular disease. It usually has twenty different uroscopy flasks with urine of different colors aligned around the border of the circle. Each flask has a line that connects it to a summary of a particular disease. This allowed doctors to have a quick reference guide to twenty different types of urine.

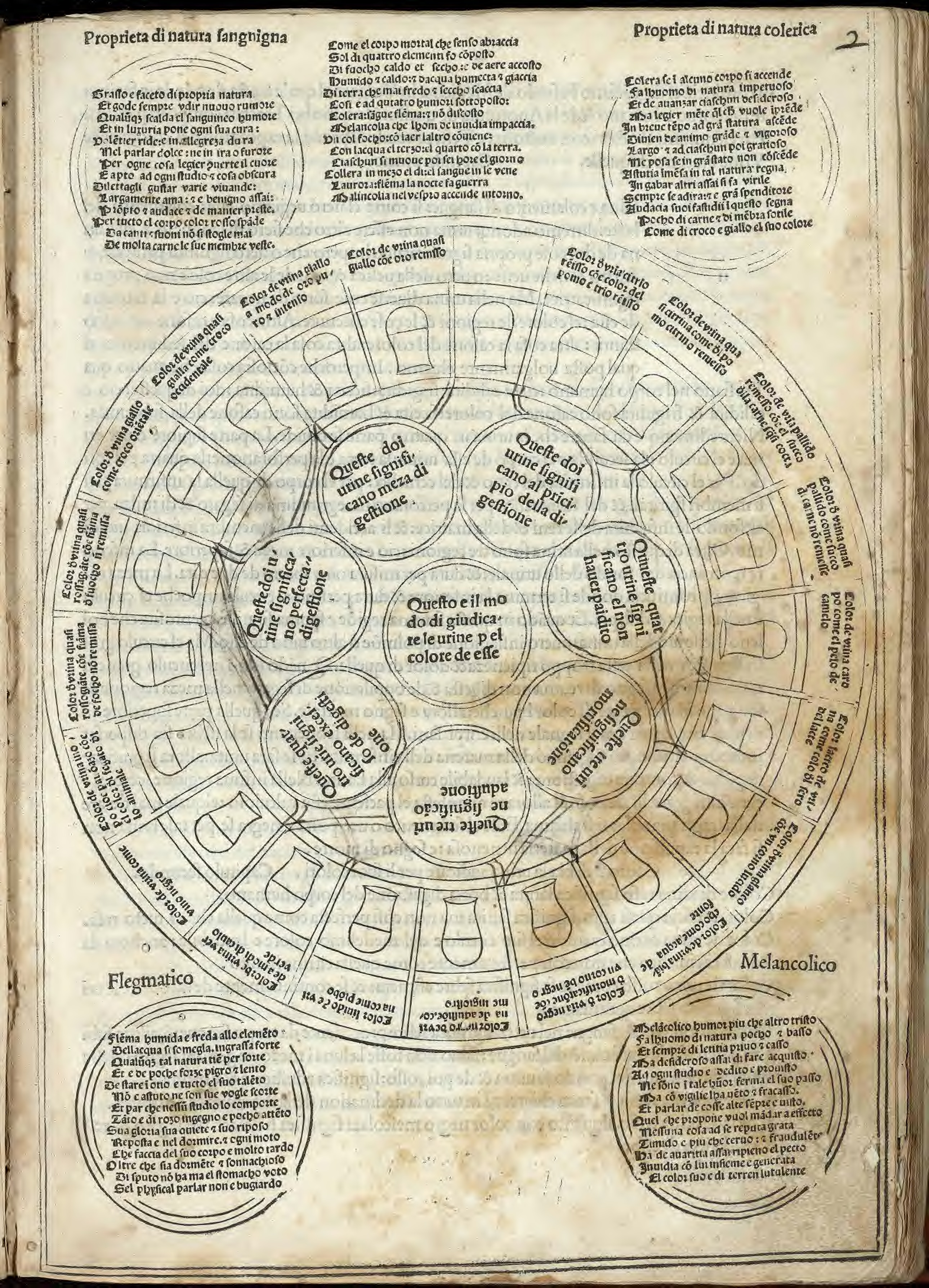
"First Table of Urines" in the Fasciculus Medicinae

These charts were originally only published in Latin, meaning only the educated and university-trained physicians could understand them.

The Fasciculus Medicinae, first printed in Venice in 1491, was another collection of medieval treatises that was continuously copied for years after its production. Its first book, which is on uroscopy, contains folio labeled as "First Table of Urines," and displays a wheel of urine with twenty-one different matula. The four corners of the diagram depict the four different temperaments, sanguine (ruled by blood), choleric (ruled by yellow bile), phlegmatic (ruled by phlegm), and melancholic (ruled by black bile). This is a physical manifestation of the humoral theory impacting the examination of urine.

=== Temperature ===
The temperature at which the urine is examined is a very important factor to consider in the process of uroscopy. When a patient urinates, the urine will be warm, so it is necessary for it to stay warm for proper evaluation. However, during the period when the sample sets for a couple of hours, the urine should not be exposed to extreme heat or intense sunlight, as it might change the chemical composition. This method was established when Ismail of Jurjani, an 11th-century Persian physician, recommended collecting the full amount of a urine sample over a 24-hour period and suggested that it remain out of direct sunlight or excess heat to protect its original color for a proper diagnosis. He also considered how diet and aging can change urine, therefore requiring restful sleep and an empty stomach when obtaining samples. Joannes Actuarius gave detailed instructions in his seven-volume manuscript, De Urinis Libri Septum, which relayed similar sentiments.

The external temperature should be the same as the internal temperature. When the temperature of urine goes down the bubbles in it will change. Some of them will disappear, but some will remain. With the temperature decrease, particles and impurities will be more difficult to evaluate. They will move toward the middle of the flask, then sink to the bottom. They will all mix, making it more difficult to see the impurities.

Another problem with urine cooling is that it would become thicker. The longer that it had to cool down the more likely it was that the crystals in it would bond together, causing it to thicken. This could lead to a false diagnosis, that is why doctors usually inspected the urine quickly.

Additionally, heat and cold were thought to impact the color of the urine, and dryness and moistness would affect its texture. The absence and excess of heat were believed to originate from complications with the spiritus (natural body heat produced in the heart), or from a malfunction in digestion causing too much hot or cold humor to be present in the body.

Richard Bright in the 19th century invented a technique that allowed doctors to examine a patient's urine effectively after the temperature had dropped. The process involved heating water, then inserting the uroscopy flask containing cooled urine. This would heat the urine causing the crystals that formed during loss of temperature to break down. As a result, the urine will become thin again. This process is very effective, but a doctor should "also be careful not to shake them much before you inspect them for you will move the particles and destroy the bubbles and dilute the deposits and confuse the situation," (The Late Greco-Roman and Byzantine Contribution to the Evolution of Laboratory Examinations of Bodily Excrement. Part1: Urine, Sperm, Menses and Stools, Pavlos C. Goudas).

== Common conditions identified by uroscopic methods ==
=== Diabetes ===
In 1674 English doctor Thomas Willis submitted into medical literature a relationship he'd observed: people with type 1 diabetes usually have sweet-tasting urine — this is due to an oversaturation of glucose in the blood, the excess of which is excreted out via urine, as the diabetic lacks sufficient insulin to process the high amounts of glucose.

Fertility/Pregnancy

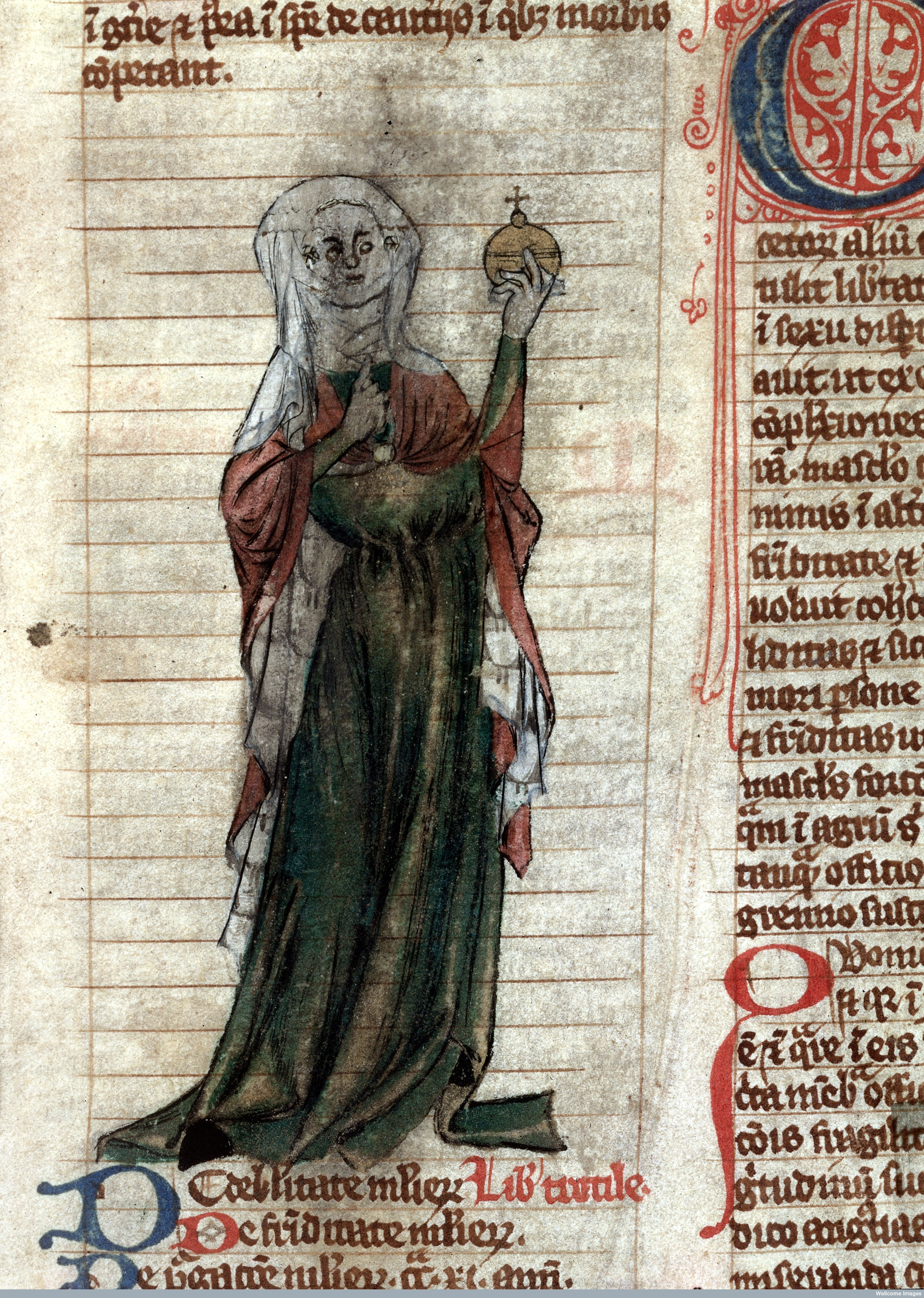
Trotula of Salerno, female practitioner and writer, holding a urine flask in her hand

Uroscopy was also believed to be useful in tracking conception through fertility testing. The Trotula, composed in Salerno in the 12th century, was the most influential compendium of women's medicine in medieval Europe. To test one's fertility, the text suggests that both husband and wife urinate in a pot of bran. After ten days, whoever's pot is stinking and filled with worms is the infertile spouse. Furthermore, The Dome of Uryne, another collection of uroscopic texts, claims it was possible to know whether a woman conceived just after intercourse. It suggests that if her urine is clear, she is pregnant, and if her urine is thick, she is not. A few months after this, the sex of the child can be deduced through the mother's urine, and lead-colored urine indicates a miscarriage has occurred.

One's sexual history could also be foretold through their urine. Urine of a "constant virgin," is "wan and extremely calm," passed through in a delicate manner as the passages of the womb and vulva are rather narrow (it was common for medieval physicians to confuse the urinary passage with the vagina). Contrastingly, thick urine signifies that a woman is "corrupt." This concept can also apply to men. If there is a seed at the bottom of a flask of male urine, he has recently had sex.

=== Jaundice ===
Yellowish discoloration of the whites of the eyes, skin, and mucous membranes caused by deposition of bilirubin in these tissues. It occurs as a symptom of various diseases, such as hepatitis, that affect the processing of bile. Also called Icterus.

Doctors would test by using their vision. If the urine had a brownish tint then the patient would most likely have jaundice.

=== Kidney disease ===
The kidneys are supposed to filter excesses (especially urea) from the blood and excrete them, along with water, as urine. When they are not performing this task the patient has a kidney disease. In the 13th century, William of Saliceto, an Italian physician, precisely depicted what would later become known as chronic nephritis. He wrote: "The signs of hardness in the kidneys are that the quantity of the urine is diminished, that there is heaviness of the kidneys, and of the spine with some pain: and the belly begins to swell up after a time and dropsy is produced the second day."

Doctors would test urine using a visual examination. If the urine was red or foamy, the patient had kidney disease. In his influential treatise, Gilles de Corbeil wrote that if pure or unclotted blood was present in the urine, especially when combined with pain symptoms, it indicated a problem with the kidneys. This is still in effect, as blood and/or cloudy urine is continually used to diagnose kidney stones/infections.

Leprosy

Urine was considered to be especially useful when aiding leprosy diagnoses. The instantaneous physiological symptom of leprosy was thought to be a malfunctioning liver. Since the liver is a central organ in digestion, medieval physicians believed that any indication of the disease would emerge upon inspecting the urine.

== See also ==
- Urinalysis
- Urology
