= Filaret =

Filaret (Philaret) is a male given name of Greek origin, commonly used as a monastic name in the Orthodox Church, literally meaning, "lover of virtue"). It may refer to:

== People ==
=== Religious ===
- Patriarch Filaret (Feodor Romanov) (1553–1633), Patriarch of Moscow 1612–1633, father of Tsar Michael I of Russia
- Philaret Drozdov (1782–1867), born Vasily, Metropolitan of Moscow 1821–1867, Orthodox saint
- Philaret Gumilevsky (1805–1866), Russian Orthodox Archbishop of Kharkov 1848–1859, and Archbishop of Chernigov 1859–1866, Orthodox saint
- Filaret Scriban (1811–1873), Romanian Orthodox titular bishop of Stavropoleos and writer
- Philaret Voznesensky (1903–1985), Metropolitan and First Hierarch of the Russian Orthodox Church Outside Russia 1964–1985
- Philaret Vakhromeyev (1935–2021), Belarusian Orthodox Metropolitan of Minsk and Slutsk 1978–2013
- Filaret Denysenko (1929–2026), head of the Ukrainian Orthodox Church – Kyiv Patriarchate since 1995

=== Other ===
- Filaret Kolessa (1871–1947), Ukrainian ethnographer, folklorist, composer, musicologist and literary critic
- Filaret Barbu (1903–1984), Romanian composer
- Filaret Pakun (1912–2002), Soviet Russian painter
- Filaret Galchev (born 1963), Russian-Greek businessman

== Other uses ==
- Filaret Association, a Lithuanian political organization founded in 1820 by Tomasz Zan
- Filaret Station, the first railway station in Romania, now a bus station; see History of Bucharest
- Filaret, name of a hill and plain in Bucharest, where the Constitution of 15 June 1848 was acclaimed
- Filaret, a village in Giurgiţa Commune, Dolj County, Romania

== See also ==
- Philaretos (disambiguation)
- Filarete (15th century), medieval Italian architect
- Philarète Chasles (1798–1873), French critic
