= Journal of Late Antique, Islamic and Byzantine Studies =

Annual academic journal

- Discipline: Late Antique, Byzantine, and Islamic studies
- Language: English

Publication details
- History: 2022–present
- Publisher: Edinburgh University Press
- Frequency: Annual
- Open access: Yes
- ISO 4: Find out here

Indexing
- ISSN: 2634-2367 (print); 2634-2375 (web)

Links
- Journal homepage

The Journal of Late Antique, Islamic and Byzantine Studies is a peer-reviewed academic journal that focuses on Late Antique, Byzantine, and Islamic literature, history, archaeology, and material culture. The journal covers research from the fourth to the fifteenth century and emphasizes interdisciplinary dialogue and cross-cultural exchange.

The editors-in-chief are Petros Bouras-Vallianatos, Marie Legendre, Daisy Livingston, and Yannis Stouraitis.
