= Aeginetia flava =

Scientific classification
- Kingdom: Plantae
- Clade: Tracheophytes
- Clade: Angiosperms
- Clade: Eudicots
- Clade: Asterids
- Order: Lamiales
- Family: Orobanchaceae
- Genus: Aeginetia
- Species: A. flava

Binomial name
- Aeginetia flava J.Parn.

Species of plant

Aeginetia flava is a plant in the broomrape family Orobanchaceae, native to Thailand. The specific epithet flava means 'yellow' or 'golden yellow', referring to the flowers.

== Description ==
Aeginetia flava grows as a herb with stems 15–20 centimetres (6–8 in) tall. The flowers, solitary on the stem, feature bright yellow petals. The ovoid fruits are capsules measuring up to 1.4 cm (0.6 in) long.

== Distribution and habitat ==
Aeginetia flava is endemic to Thailand, where it is confined to Khao Soi Dao Wildlife Sanctuary. Its habitat is in rainforest, at altitudes of 1,400–1,540 m (4,600–5,100 ft). In common with other species of its genus, Aeginetia flava is parasitic. In this population, it attaches to the roots of a Strobilanthes species.
