= Demetrios Pepagomenos =

Demetrios Pepagomenos or Demetrius Pepagomenus (Greek: Δημήτριος Πεπαγωμένος, 1200–1300) was a Byzantine Greek savant who resided in Constantinople. He became a physician, a veterinary physician, and a naturalist.

== Biography ==
=== Court physician ===
During the 13th century, Demetrios Pepagomenos became the court physician of Emperor Michael VIII Palaeologos (r. 1259–1261) and was commissioned by the Byzantine emperor to compose a work on gout. In his Σύνταγμα περὶ τῆς ποδάγρας, Pepagomenos considered gout a diathesis caused by a defective elimination of excreta. Although Demetrios Pepagomenos is credited for providing a general description of gout, it was John Chumnus (utilizing Pepagomenos's work) who specifically established a proper diet for treating the condition.

=== Veterinary physician ===
As a veterinary physician, Demetrios Pepagomenos wrote a treatise on feeding and nursing hawks (specifically gyrfalcon) entitled Περὶ τῆς τῶν ἰεράκων ἀνατροφῆς τε καἰ θεραπεὶας. He also wrote a treatise on the care and treatment of canines entitled Cynosophion although it is presumed that this particular work was perhaps written by Caelius Aurelianus, a 3rd-century author and translator.

== Translation and publication of works ==
In 1517, Demetrios Pepagomenos's works on gout were translated and published in Latin by the great post-Byzantine humanist, Marcus Musurus, in Venice. They were also published in Paris in 1558.

== In Mazaris ==
Demetrios Pepagomenos is lampooned in a 15th-century satire, Mazaris' Journey to Hades, as a doctor who poisoned himself. Mazaris says he had two sons: the older, Saromates ("Lizard Eyes"), also a doctor, and Theodosios the Little Stinker, a social climber. When Emperor Manuel II Palaeologos (r. 1391–1425) visited the Morea in 1415, Pepagomenos was a doctor in his retinue. He was left at Mystras to serve as court doctor to Theodore II Palaiologos, Despot of the Morea (r. 1407–1443). In that capacity, he attended the childbed of Cleofe Malatesta Palaiogina in 1433. At her subsequent death, he delivered a funeral oration.

Pepagomenos may have been the copyist of the medical manuscript Paris gr. 2256. He was the recipient of letters from John Eugenikos, and a correspondent of Cardinal Bessarion.

== See also ==
- Byzantine medicine
