= Ethical Education in Plutarch: Moralising Agents and Contexts =

Book by Sophia Xenophontos

Ethical Education in Plutarch
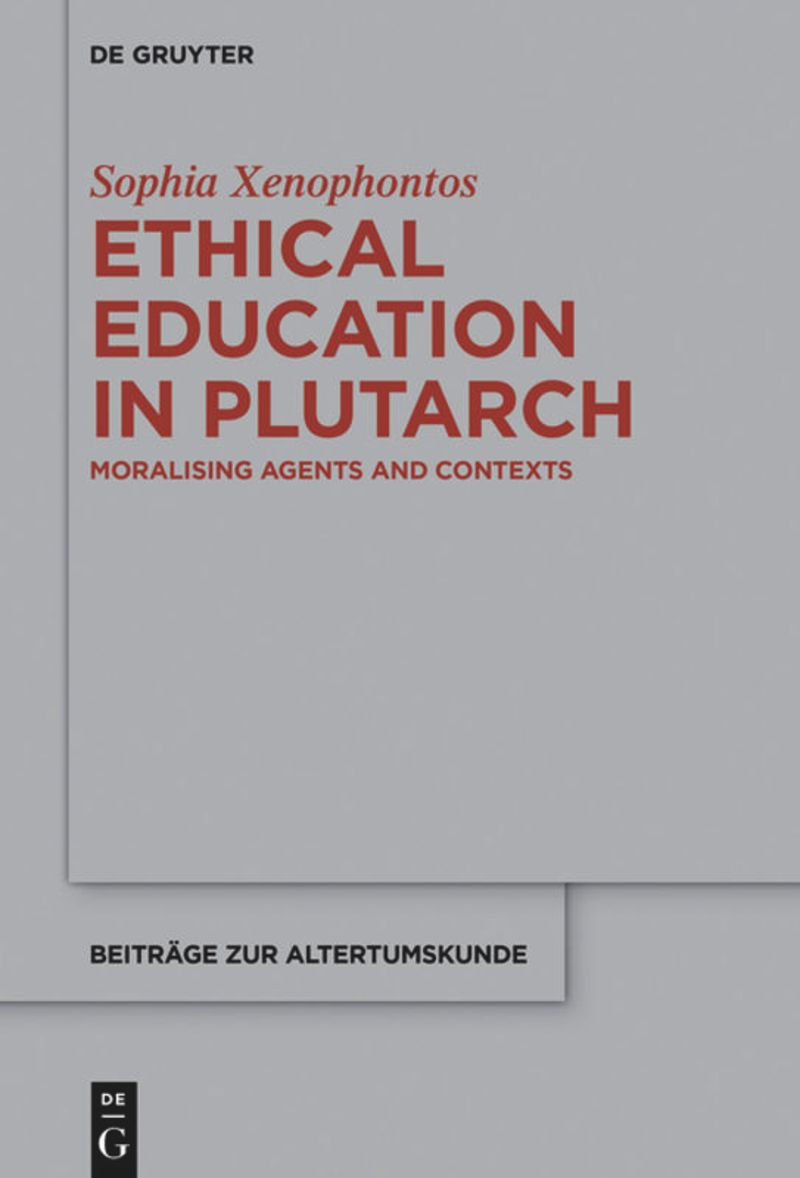
- Cover
- Author: Sophia Xenophontos
- Original title: Ethical Education in Plutarch: Moralising Agents and Contexts
- Language: English
- Subject: History of education, ancient ethics
- Genre: Non-fiction
- Publisher: De Gruyter
- Publication date: May 24, 2016
- Publication place: Germany
- Pages: 276
- ISBN: 978-3-11-035036-4

Ethical Education in Plutarch: Moralising Agents and Contexts is a 2016 monograph by Greek-Cypriot author and academic Sophia Xenophontos that delves into Plutarch's concept of ethical education. It examines Plutarch's views on sons, daughters, women, and the influence of pedagogical ideas in politics, the military, and the symposium.

== Overview ==
The book explores key aspects of ethical education in Plutarch's works. Plutarch's concept of paideia is portrayed as a lifelong process, dedicated to shaping one's character. Influenced by renowned Greek philosophers such as Plato, Aristotle, and the Stoics, Plutarch weaves their ethical teachings into his own. Mothers are assigned a significant role in molding an individual's character, and Plutarch's unique concept of motherhood harmoniously blends both Greek and Roman ideals. Pedagogues and teachers are seen as crucial moral educators throughout one's life, emphasizing that ethical education extends well into adulthood. Plutarch also highlights the potential for well-educated statesmen to assume the role of moral teachers, a concept further mirrored in the military, where ethical leadership is prioritized. In this landscape, symposia emerge as vital spaces for ethical discussions and education, and socialization acts as a linchpin in the transmission of ethical teachings from one generation to the next.

== Reception ==
The book was praised for its thorough research, innovative insights and convincing argument that Plutarch was a dedicated ethical teacher. James Uden (Note: of Boston University) considered the monograph a comprehensive exploration of Plutarch's views on education and ethics. Marion Schneider (Note: of the Institute for Classical Philology at Julius-Maximilians University of Würzburg) considered it "a comprehensive and well-founded investigation". Mathilde Cambron-Goulet (Note: of the University of Quebec in Montreal) wrote that Xenophontos emphasizes the prevalence of moral education in both the "Lives" and "Moralia," encouraging a "holistic reading" of Plutarch's works. Geert Roskam (Note: of KU Leuven) commended the monograph for providing a new model in Plutarchan studies through its analytical character and methodological precision. While Kendra Eshleman (Note: of Boston College) said the book "points toward valuable lines of inquiry into the role of Greek paideia in ethical formation and the internal coherence of Plutarch's corpus."
