= Nicholas Myrepsos =

Byzantine physician

Nicholas Myrepsos (or Nicolaus Myrepsus; Greek: Νικόλαος Μυρεψός; flourished c. 1240–80) was a Byzantine physician known chiefly for his compendium on medical science which is still extant.

== Life ==
Little is known about the life of Nicholas. He is probably the same physician who is mentioned by George Acropolites as being eminent in his profession, but very ignorant of natural philosophy. He was at the court of John III Doukas Vatatzes at Nicaea, when a solar eclipse took place on October 6, 1241, that shortly preceded the death of the empress Irene. Here he was held in great esteem by the emperor, and attained the dignity of actuarius. All this agrees very well with the scattered notices of his date and his personal history that we find in his own work. He mentions Mesue the Younger, who died 1015; "Michael Angelus regalis," who is probably Michael VIII Palaiologos who began to reign 1259; "Papa Nicolaus," who seems to be Pope Nicholas III, who began to reign 1277; and "Dominus Joannes," and "Magister Johannes," who is probably Joannes Actuarius, who lived in the 13th century. He mentions his having visited or lived at Nicaea, and also Alexandria, whence he is sometimes called Nicolaus Alexandrinus.

== Work ==
Nicholas compiled and revised Ancient Greek scripts including, but not limited to Galen, as well as writing his own compendium on medical science, named Dynameron (Δυνάμερον). It consists of 48 sections, containing more than 2500 medical formulae, arranged according to their form and object. It is chiefly compiled from former writers, and contains many superstitious remedies. It remained the principal pharmaceutical code of the Parisian medical faculty until 1651. He is well known for the preparation, Aurea Alexandrina.

== See also ==
- Byzantine medicine
