= Barbara Zipser =

Historian of Greek medicine

Barbara Zipser is a Historian of Greek medicine from antiquity to the Middle Ages. She is currently Senior Lecturer at Royal Holloway, University of London. Her research has been primarily funded by the Wellcome Trust.

== Education ==
Zipser received her PhD from the University of Heidelberg in 2003. Her doctoral thesis was entitled Pseudo-Alexander Trallianus de oculis, Einleitung, Text, Übersetzung und Kommentar.

== Career ==
Following the completion of her doctorate, Zipser was awarded a Wellcome Trust grant for a postdoctoral project on a vernacular Greek medical text by John the Physician. Zipser produced the first critical edition and translation of the text, which was published by Brill in 2009, as John the Physician's Therapeutics: a Medical Handbook in Vernacular Greek. Zipser moved to RHUL funded again by the Wellcome Trust, including a University Award. In 2019, Zipser won a Collaborative Wellcome Award for a project that develops a methodology for the identification of medicinal plants and minerals. Zipser leads the project which is an international collaboration between Royal Holloway, Kew Royal Botanic Gardens, and the PTS Zurich and Haifa.

Zipser established 'Simon Online', a crowd-sourced open-access Wiki edition of Simon of Genoa's clavis sanationis, a Latin-Greek-Arabic medical dictionary from the late thirteenth century CE.

In 2019, Zipser analysed ransom notes from 1981 in the kidnapping and murder case of ten-year old Ursula Herrmann, which had gone cold. Zipser used her skills in linguistic analysis to profile the ransom notes in order to determine the kidnappers identity, comparing them with writing samples by Werner Mazurek, the man who was convicted. Based on her analysis, Zipser concluded that “I am sure it was not Mazurek”. Her conclusions were submitted to the state prosecutor's office by Ursula Herrmann's brother.

== Bibliography ==
- Zipser, Barbara (2020). "Wellcomensis MS.MSL.14 as a Therapeutic Handbook". In Bouras-Vallianatos, P. (ed.). Exploring Greek Manuscripts in the Library at Wellcome Collection London. London: Routledge. pp. 54–65.
- Zipser, Barbara; Bouras-Vallianatos, P., eds. (2019). Brill's Companion to the Reception of Galen. Leiden: Brill.
  - Zipser, Barbara (2019). "Galen in Byzantine iatrosophia". In Zipser, Barbara; Bouras-Vallianatos, P. (eds.). Brill's Companion to the Reception of Galen. Leiden: Brill. pp. 111–123.
- Zipser, Barbara, ed. (2013). Medical Books in the Byzantine World. Bologna: Eikasmos.
- Zipser, Barbara, ed. (2013). Simon of Genoa's Medical Lexicon. London: Versita/de Gruyter.
- Zipser, Barbara (2009). John the Physician's Therapeutics: A Medical Handbook in Vernacular Greek. Studies in Ancient Medicine. Vol. 37. Leiden: Brill.
