= Articella =

Collection of medical texts

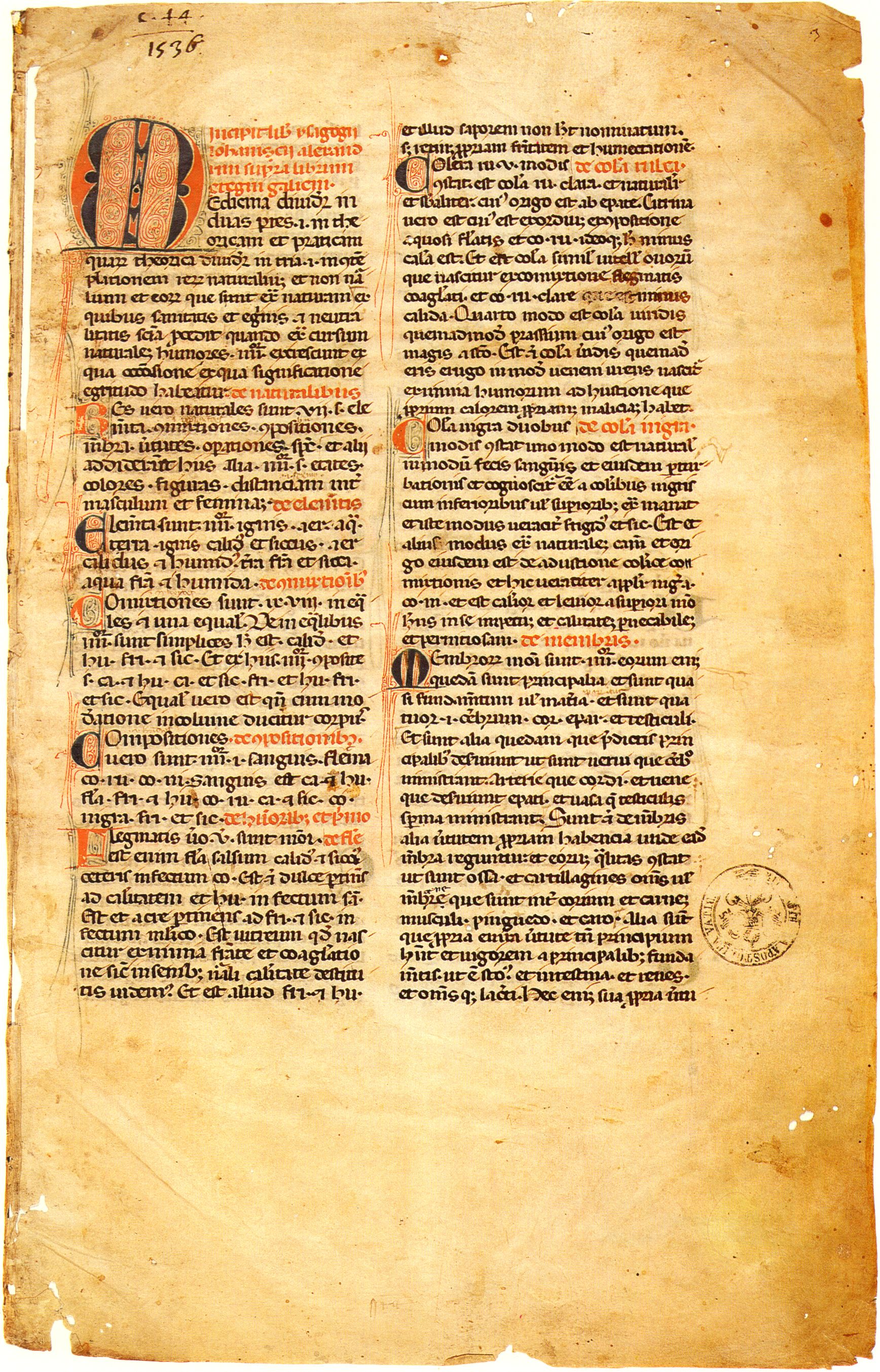
Biblioteca Apostolica Vaticana, MS Palatinus lat. 1102, fol. 3r.

The Articella ('little art') or Ars medicinae ('art of medicine') is a Latin collection of medical treatises bound together in one volume that was used mainly as a textbook and reference manual between the 13th and the 16th centuries. In medieval times, several versions of this anthology circulated in manuscript form among medical students. Between 1476 and 1534, printed editions of the Articella were also published in several European cities.

The earliest surviving manuscript of the collection was copied just after 1100. The original five texts, in their standard order, are the Isagoge Ioannitii ad Tegni Galieni by Hunayn ibn Ishaq; the Hippocratic Aphorisms and Prognostics; the De urinis of Theophilus Protospatharius; and the De pulsibus of Philaretus. The collection is usually supposed to have grown around Hunayn's Isagoge, an abridged introduction to Galen's classical Greek treatise Ars medica (Techne iatrike) translated from Arabic into Latin by Constantine the African in the 11th century. It circulated independently of the Articella. In the late 12th century, Galen's Ars was added to the Articella as a sixth text under the title Tegni. It was later moved into second place.

In the mid-13th century, the emergence of formal medical education in several European universities fueled a demand for comprehensive textbooks. Instructors from the influential Salernitan medical school in southern Italy popularized the practice of binding other treatises together with their manuscript copies of the Isagoge.

== See also ==
- Medieval medicine of Western Europe

== Bibliography ==
- Cornelius O'Boyle. Thirteenth- and Fourteenth-Century Copies of the "Ars Medicine": A Checklist and Contents Descriptions of the Manuscripts. Articella Studies: Texts and Interpretations in Medieval and Renaissance Medical Teaching, no. 1. Cambridge: Cambridge Wellcome Unit for the History of Medicine, and CSIC Barcelona, Department of History of Science, 1998.
- Jon Arrizabalaga. The "Articella" in the Early Press, c. 1476-1534. Articella Studies: Texts and Interpretations in Medieval and Renaissance Medical Teaching, no. 2. Cambridge: Cambridge Wellcome Unit for the History of Medicine, and CSIC Barcelona, Department of History of Science, 1998.
- Papers of the Articella Project Meeting, Cambridge, December 1995. Articella Studies: Texts and Interpretations in Medieval and Renaissance Medical Teaching, no. 3. Cambridge: Cambridge Wellcome Unit for the History of Medicine, and CSIC Barcelona, Department of History of Science, 1998.
