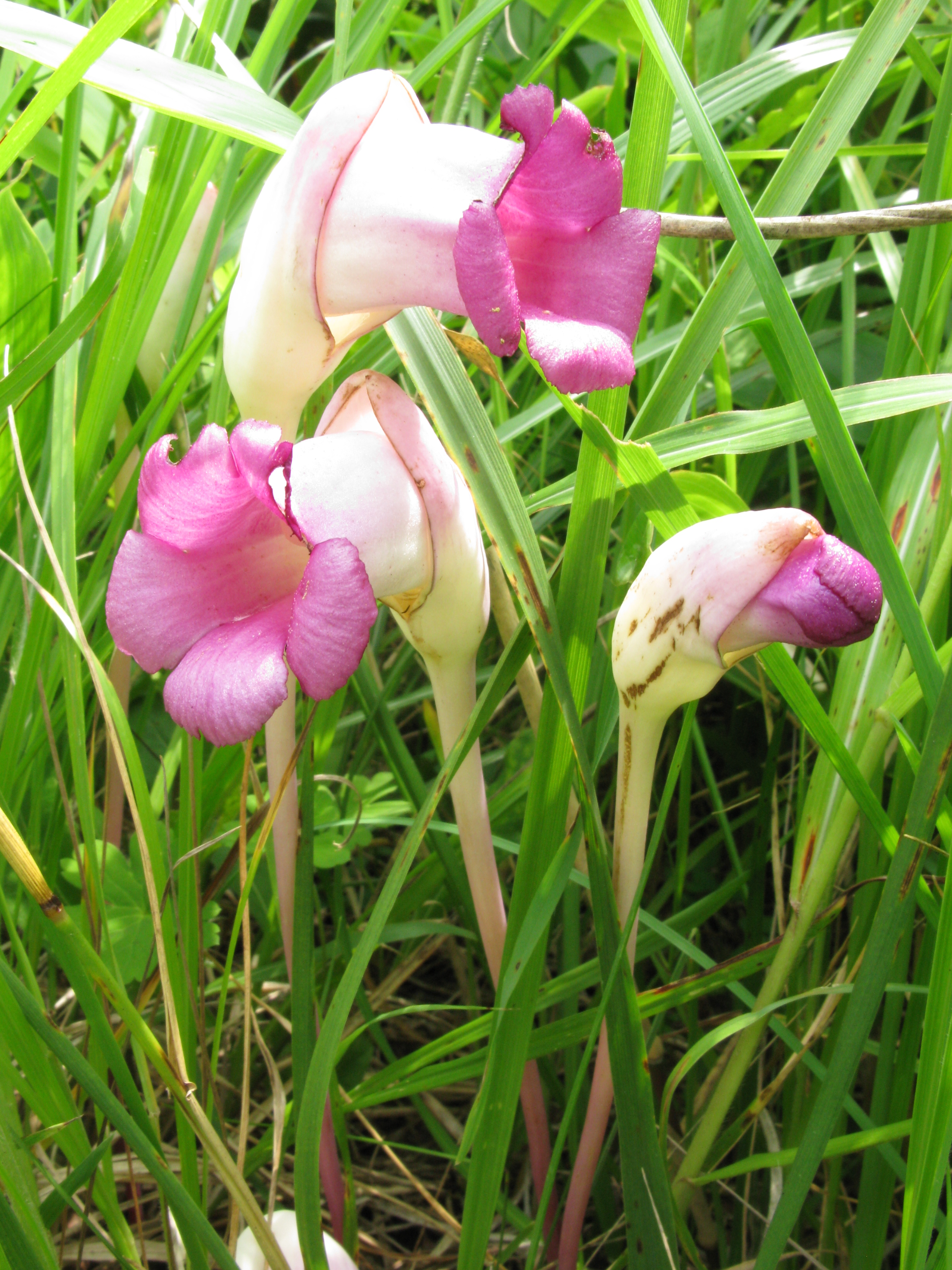
- Aeginetia sinensis

Scientific classification
- Kingdom: Plantae
- Clade: Tracheophytes
- Clade: Angiosperms
- Clade: Eudicots
- Clade: Asterids
- Order: Lamiales
- Family: Orobanchaceae
- Tribe: Buchnereae
- Genus: Aeginetia; L.

Species
- See text

Synonyms
- Centronia Blume; Centronota DC. ex Meisn.; Gasparinia Endl.; Oeginetia Wight; Tronicena Steud.

= Aeginetia =

Genus of flowering plants

Aeginetia is a genus of plants in the broomrape family Orobanchaceae, native mostly to tropical Asia and also Cameroon (in Africa).

It is found within Assam, Bangladesh, Borneo, Cambodia, southern China, East Himalaya, India, Japan, Jawa, Korea, Laos, Malaya, Myanmar, Nansei-shoto, Nepal, New Guinea, Ogasawara-shoto, Philippines, Sri Lanka, Sulawesi, Sumatera, Taiwan, Thailand and Vietnam.

The genus name of Aeginetia is in honour of Paul of Aegina (c. 625 – c. 690), a Byzantine Greek born physician best known for writing the medical encyclopedia, Medical Compendium in Seven Books. It was first described and published in Sp. Pl. on page 632 in 1753.

== Species ==
As of May 2020, Plants of the World Online recognises the following species:

- Aeginetia acaulis (Roxb.) Walp. (synonym A.sessilis Shivam. & Rajanna)
- Aeginetia flava J.Parn.
- Aeginetia indica L.
- Aeginetia mirabilis (Blume) Bakh.
- Aeginetia mpomii Letouzey
- Aeginetia selebica Bakh.
- Aeginetia sinensis Beck
