= Sophia Xenophontos =

Greek-Cypriot academic and author

Sophia Xenophontos FHEA, MAE
- Occupations: Classicist, author

Academic background
- Education: Magdalen College, University of Oxford

Academic work
- Discipline: Classicist
- Sub-discipline: Ancient Greek literature, Byzantine literature
- Institutions: Aristotle University of Thessaloniki, University of Glasgow
- Main interests: Plutarch, Galen; reception of ancient Greek literature and thought in Byzantium; Aristotelian commentaries; emotions, practical ethics and psychotherapy in antiquity and the medieval period; textual criticism and translation
- Notable works: Ethical Education in Plutarch: Moralising Agents and Contexts (2016)

Sophia Xenophontos FHEA, MAE is a Greek-Cypriot classicist and Senior Researcher at the Academy of Athens (Research Centre for Greek and Latin Literature), and formerly an associate professor of Greek at Aristotle University of Thessaloniki. She is also affiliate scholar with the University of Glasgow, where she was previously lecturer in Classics and principal investigator and director of the Byzantine Aristotle project funded by the AHRC. Xenophontos is an external collaborator for the Commentaria in Aristotelem Graeca et Byzantina project (under the auspices of the Berlin-Brandenburg Academy of Sciences and Humanities) and the founder and editor-in-chief of the book series ‘Theorising the Greek and Roman Classics’ (Routledge, UK).

She specializes in the Greek literature of the 1st-2nd century AD, with particular focus on Plutarch. She has made significant contributions to the field, with her novel approaches to Plutarch's Lives and Moralia, which have been acclaimed by several reviewers. Xenophontos has expanded her scholarly pursuits to include the physician Galen of Pergamum, investigating the interplay between his psychological/moral writings and medical theory and practice. She has received recognition, including a Wellcome Trust University Award. Its main output is the monograph ‘Medicine and Practical Ethics in Galen’ published in 2024 by Cambridge University Press, which was highly praised. (Note: Anna Peterson from Pennsylvania State University wrote: "Xenophontos' book is an exciting addition to the scholarship on Galen. Her exploration of the practical ethics of antiquity's most voluminous writer-particularly his literary, rhetorical, and argumentative strategies-offers new ways of understanding Galen as a moralist. Medicine and Practical Ethics in Galen will be of profound interest both to readers of Galen and to students of imperial philosophy", while Chiara Thumiger of the Christian-Albrecht University of Kiel wrote: "In this very welcome contribution to Galenic studies Sophia Xenophontos offers a comprehensive and engaging account of the full scope of Galen's involvement with ethical questions, not only in theory but in the lived reality of patient's cases and in the practicality of his activities as physician.") Her research on Galen has had an impact beyond academia, featuring in the German Der Spiegel, thus also contributing to popular understandings of ancient psychotherapy and emotions.

Active in the Aristotelian commentary tradition and the study of Byzantine philosophical works, Xenophontos has published critical editions and translations, focusing mainly on Theodore Metochites and George Pachymeres in whom she is considered a leading authority.

== Select publications ==
=== Books ===
- Xenophontos, Sophia. Medicine and Practical Ethics in Galen. Cambridge: Cambridge University Press, 2024. ISBN 9781009247795
- Galen, On Avoiding Distress, On My Own Opinions. Critical Edition by Ioannis Polemis and Sophia Xenophontos; Translation by Sophia Xenophontos. Berlin: De Gruyter, Trends in Classics, 2023. ISBN 9783111320816
- Georgios Pachymeres, Commentary on Aristotle, Nicomachean Ethics: Critical Edition with Introduction and Translation. Edited by Sophia Xenophontos. Translated by Sophia Xenophontos and Crystal Addey. Berlin: De Gruyter, Commentaria in Aristotelem Graeca et Byzantina, 2022. ISBN 9783110642841
- Marmodoro, Anna, and Sophia Xenophontos, eds. The Reception of Greek Ethics in Late Antiquity and Byzantium. Cambridge: Cambridge University Press, 2021. ISBN 9781108833691
- Theodore Metochites. On Morals or Concerning Education. Translated by Sophia Xenophontos. Dumbarton Oaks Medieval Library 61. Cambridge, Mass.; London: Harvard University Press, 2020. ISBN 9780674244634
- Xenophontos, Sophia, and Katerina Oikonomopoulou, eds. Brill's Companion to the Reception of Plutarch. Vol. 20. Brill: Leiden, 2019. ISBN 9789004409446
- Bouras-Vallianatos, Petros, and Sophia Xenophontos, eds. Greek Medical Literature and its Readers: From Hippocrates to Islam and Byzantium. London-New York: Routledge, 2018. (Note: Reviews: ‘Through nine chapters focusing on authors spreading from Hippocrates to the medieval readers of Galen, and covering such diverse areas as classical Greece, Byzantium, and the Islamic world, the volume offers an interesting array of concise case studies...The editors’ work must be commended for a coherent collection of chapters, with a clear focus and helpful pointers and bibliographies. It is also produced to a high standard. The collection will be especially useful to medical historians with a focus on ancient Greek medicine and its afterlife’ - Caroline Petit, Bulletin of the History of Medicine, Volume 94, Number 3 (Fall 2020) ‘... this volume enriches the bibliography and adds a significant title to the research into the complexities of Greek medical writings from the fifth century BC down to the fourteenth century AD, their reception and their influence on various intellectual milieus. Anyone interested in Greek medical tradition will gain a great profit from the book.’ - Maria Chrone, Byzantina Symmeikta 30 (2020) ‘The present volume does a good job in showing how, while claiming its status as an individual technê, ancient medicine remains sensitive to its sharedness and openness across a stratified audience whose members have different skills, needs and expectations... the volume deals with a novel – and thorny – subject, and for that it should be praised.’ - George Kazantzidis, The Classical Review 69.2 (2019) ‘[T]he editors have brought together some interesting articles ... These new collections of articles on a single topic have the advantage of making it easier for other scholars to locate relevant studies.’ - Timothy S. Miller, Bryn Mawr Classical Review (2018.07.30)) ISBN 9780367593209
- Xenophontos, Sophia. Ethical Education in Plutarch: Moralising Agents and Contexts (2016) ISBN 978-3110350364

=== Articles ===
- Xenophontos, Sophia. "Medical Imagery in Maximus of Tyre’s Orations." Medical History 67.3 (2023): 211–227. doi:10.1017/mdh.2023.23
- Xenophontos, Sophia. "Exploring Emotions in Late Byzantium: Theodore Metochites on Affectivity." Byzantion 91 (2021): 423–463. doi:10.2143/BYZ.91.0.3289891
- Xenophontos, Sophia. "The reception of Plutarch in George Pisides’ panegyrical poems." Byzantine and Modern Greek Studies 44, no. 2 (2020): 189-211. doi:10.1017/byz.2020.1
- Xenophontos, Sophia. "The cultural dynamics of the term Hellanodikes in Palaiologan Byzantium." Byzantinische Zeitschrift 108, no. 1 (2015): 219–228. doi:10.1515/bz-2015-0012
- Xenophontos, Sophia A. "Reading Plutarch in nineteenth-century Greece: classical paideia, political emancipation, and national awareness—the case of Adamantios Koraes." Classical Receptions Journal 6, no. 1 (2014): 131–157. doi:10.1093/crj/cls011
- Xenophontos, Sophia. "Resorting to rare sources of antiquity: Nikephoros Basilakes and the popularity of Plutarch’s Parallel Lives in twelfth-century Byzantium." Parekbolai (2014): 1–12. doi:10.26262/par.v4i0.4017
- Xenophontos, Sophia. "‘A living portrait of Cato’: self-fashioning and the classical past in John Tzetzes’ Chiliads." Estudios bizantinos 2 (2014): 187-204.
- Xenophontos, Sophia. "Psychotherapy and moralising rhetoric in Galen’s newly discovered Avoiding Distress (Peri Alypias)." Medical History 58, no. 4 (2014): 585–603. doi:10.1017/mdh.2014.54
- Xenophontos, Sophia A. "Imagery and Education in Plutarch." Classical Philology 108, no. 2 (2013): 126–138. doi:10.1086/671417
- Xenophontos, Sophia A. "Plutarch's Compositional Technique in the An seni respublica gerenda sit: Clusters vs. Patterns." American journal of philology (2012): 61–91.
- Xenophontos, Sophia. "Comedy in Plutarch’s Parallel Lives." Greek Roman and Byzantine Studies 52, no. 4 (2012): 603–631.
- Xenophontos, Sophia. "Peri agathou strategou: Plutarch’s Fabius Maximus and the ethics of generalship." Hermes 140, no. 2 (2012): 160–183.

=== Book chapters ===
- Xenophontos, Sophia. ‘George Pachymeres’ Commentary on Aristotle's Nicomachean Ethics: A New witness to Philosophical Instruction and Moral Didacticism in Late Byzantium’, in The Reception of Greek Ethics in Late Antiquity and Byzantium. Cambridge: Cambridge University Press, 2021, eds. S. Xenophontos and A. Marmodoro, 226–248.
- Xenophontos, Sophia. "Plutarch and Theodore Metochites." In Brill's Companion to the Reception of Plutarch, pp. 310–323. Brill, 2019. doi:10.1163/9789004409446_020
- Xenophontos, Sophia. "Plutarch and Adamantios Koraes." In Brill's Companion to the Reception of Plutarch, pp. 546–562. Brill, 2019. doi:10.1163/9789004409446_034
- Xenophontos, Sophia. Galen's Exhortation to the Study of Medicine: An Educational Work for Prospective Medical Students”, in Greek Medical Literature and its Readers: From Hippocrates to Islam and Byzantium. London-New York: Routledge, 2018, eds. P. Bouras-Vallianatos and S. Xenophontos, 67–93.
- ‘The Byzantine Plutarch: Self-identity and Model in Theodore Metochites’ Essay 71 of the Semeioseis gnomikai’, in The Afterlife of Plutarch. London: Bulletin of the Institute of Classical Studies Supplement. Institute of Classical Studies (2018), eds. P. Mack and J. North, 23-39.
- Xenophontos, Sophia. “Military Space and Paideia in the Lives of Pyrrhus and Marius”, in Space, Time, and Language in Plutarch. Berlin-New York: De Gruyter, 2017, eds. A. Georgiadou and Κ. Oikonomopoulou, 317–326. (The chapter was translated into Russian upon invitation; it features in Hypothekai [2020] 4: 207–223). doi:10.32880/2587-7127-2019-4-4-207-223
- Xenophontos, Sophia. "Plutarch", in A Companion to Ancient Education. Chichester:Wiley-Blackwell, 2015, ed. Martin Bloomer, 335–346.
- Xenophontos, Sophia. "From Chaeronea to Paris: Adamantios Koraes as a reader of Plutarch and the choice of heroes." (2013): 455–464.
