= Joannes Actuarius =

13th and 14th-century Byzantine physician

Johannes Zacharias Actuarius (Greek: Ἰωάννης Ζαχαρίου Ἀκτουάριος; c. 1275 – c. 1328), son of Zacharias (Greek: Ζαχαρίας), was a Byzantine physician in Constantinople. He is given the title of Actuarius, a dignity frequently conferred at that court upon physicians.

== Biography ==
Very little is known of the events of Actuarius' life, and his dates are debated, as some reckon him to have lived in the eleventh century, and others place him as recently as the beginning of the fourteenth. He probably lived towards the end of the thirteenth century, as one of his works is dedicated to his tutor, Joseph Racendytes, who lived in the reign of Andronikos II Palaiologos (1282–1328). One of his school-fellows is supposed to have been Apocauchus, whom he describes (though without naming him) as going upon an embassy to the north.

Actuarius wrote several books on medicinal subjects, particularly, an extensive treatise about the urines and uroscopy. Around 1299, he considered moving to Thessalonica, but decided to stay in Constantinople; later, he was appointed chief physician to the Emperor.

Some of Actuarius' works were translated into Latin, and published in the 16th century.

== Works ==
- Περὶ ἐνεργειῶν καὶ παθῶν τοῦ ψυχικοὺ πνεύματος καὶ τῆς κατ' αὐτὸ διαίτης (Lat. De Actionibus et Affectibus Spiritus Animalis, ejusque Nutritione). This is a psychological and physiological work in two books, in which all his reasoning seems to be founded upon the principles laid down by Aristotle, Galen, and others, with relation to the same subject. The style of this tract is by no means impure, and has a great mixture of the old Attic in it, which is very rarely to be met with in the later Greek writers. A tolerably full abstract of it is given by Barchusen. It was first published in a Latin translation by Giulio Alessandrini in 1547. The first edition of the original was published in 1557, edited, without notes or preface, by Jac. Goupyl. A second Greek edition appeared in 1774, under the care of J. F. Fischer. Ideler has also inserted it in the first volume of his Physici et Medici Graeci Minores (1841); and the first part of J. S. Bernardi Reliquiae Medico-Criticae (1795) contains some Greek Scholia on the work.
- Θεραπευτικὴ μέθοδος (Lat. De Methodo Medendi). Six books which have hitherto appeared complete only in a Latin translation, though Dietz had, before his death, collected materials for a Greek edition of this and his other works. In these books, says Friend, though he chiefly follows Galen, and very often Aëtius Amidenus and Paulus Aegineta without naming them, yet he makes use of whatever he finds to his purpose both in the old and modern writers, Greeks as well "barbarians"; and indeed we find in him several things that are not to be met with elsewhere. The work was written extempore, and designed for the use of Apocauchus during his embassy to the north. A Latin translation of this work by Corn. H. Mathisius, was first published in 1554. The first four books appear sometimes to have been considered to form a complete work, of which the first and second have been inserted by Ideler in the second volume of his Physici et Medici Graeci Minores (1542), under the title Περὶ διαγνώσεως παθῶν (Lat. De Morborum Dignotione), and from which the Greek extracts in H. Stephens's Dictionarium Medicum (1564) are probably taken. The fifth and sixth books have also been taken for a separate work, and were published by themselves in a Latin translation by Ioannes Ruellius (1539), with the title De Medicamentorum Compositione. An extract from this work is inserted in Jean Fernel's collection of writers De Febribus (1576).
- Περὶ οὔρων (Lat. De Urinis). A treatise on urine in seven books. Actuarius treated of this subject fully and distinctly, and, though he goes upon the plan which Theophilus Protospatharius had marked out, yet he has added a great deal of original matter. It is the most complete and systematic work on the subject that remains from antiquity, so much so that, till the chemical improvements of the 19th century, he had left hardly anything new to be said by the moderns, many of whom transcribed it almost word for word. This work was first published in a Latin translation by Ambrose Leo (1519), and has been reprinted numerous times; the Greek original was published for the first time in the second volume of Ideler's work quoted above. Two Latin editions of his collected works are said by Choulant to have been published in the same year, 1556, one at Paris, and the other at Lyons.
