= Philaretus (medical writer) =

Greek medical writer

Philaretus (Φιλάρετος, Philáretos) was a medical writer to whom a version of De pulsibus ad Antonium, a Greek treatise on the pulse is attributed. His name is associated only with a Byzantine revision of the text, probably from the ninth century AD. Whether he was responsible for the original treatise or only the later revision is disputed. The treatise belongs to the Galenic tradition and is influenced by the Pheumismatists. It shares diagrams with the works of Theophilus Protospatharius. By the eleventh century, a Latin translation was known at the medical school in Salerno. Included in the Articella compendium, it became one of the basic medical handbooks of the western Middle Ages.
