= Aurea Alexandrina =

Aurea Alexandrina was an ancient opiate. It is called Aurea from the gold which enters its composition, and Alexandrina for the physician Nicolaus Myresus Alexandrinus, who invented it. It was considered to be a good preservative against colic and apoplexy.
