= Alexander of Tralles =

6th-century Byzantine physician

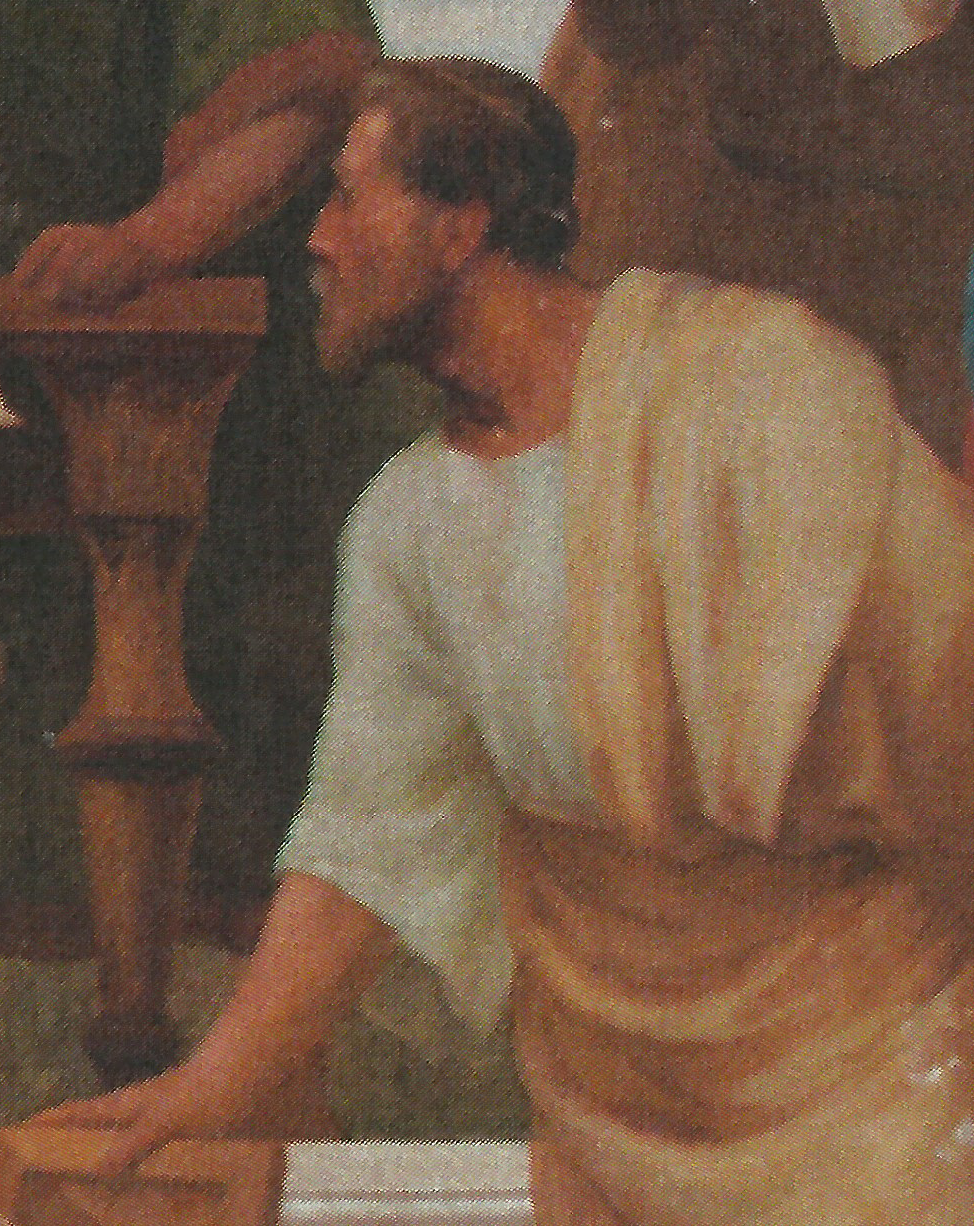
Alexander of Tralles, 1906, by Veloso Salgado (NOVA Medical School, Lisbon)

Alexander of Tralles (Medieval Greek: Ἀλέξανδρος ὁ Τραλλιανός; ca. 525 – ca. 605) was one of the most eminent physicians in the Byzantine Empire. His birth date may safely be put in the 6th century AD, for he mentions Aëtius Amidenus, who probably did not write until the end of the 5th or the beginning of the 6th century, and he is himself quoted by Paul of Aegina, who is supposed to have lived in the 7th century; besides which, he is mentioned as a contemporary of Agathias, who set about writing his History in the beginning of the reign of Justin II, about 565.

== Life ==
Alexander was born a Greek in Tralles in Asia Minor, and he had the advantage of being brought up under his father Stephanus, who was himself a physician, and also under another person, whose name he does not mention, but to whose son Cosmas he dedicates his chief work, which he wrote out of gratitude at his request. He was a man of an extensive practice, of a very long experience, and of great reputation, not only at Rome, but wherever he traveled in Spain, Gaul, and Italy, whence he was called by way of eminence "Alexander the Physician". Agathias speaks also with great praise of his four brothers, Anthemius, Dioscorus, Metrodorus, and Olympius, who were all eminent in their several professions. Alexander is not a mere compiler, like Aëtius Amidenus, Oribasius, and others, but is an author of quite a different stamp, and has more the air of an original writer. He wrote his great work in an extreme old age, from the results of his own experience, when he could no longer bear the fatigue of practice. His style in the main was, according to scholars such as John Freind, very good, short, clear, and (to use Alexander's own term) consisting of common expressions that, though not always perfectly elegant, very expressive and intelligible.

German scholar Johann Albert Fabricius considered Alexander to have belonged to the Methodic school, but in the opinion of Freind this is not proved sufficiently by the existing text.

Perhaps the most curious art of Alexander's practice appears to be his belief in charms and amulets. For example, his suggestion for treatment of ague: "Gather olive leaf before sunrise, write on it with common ink κα ροι α (ka roi a), and hang it round the neck." In exorcising gout he says, "I adjure thee by the great name Ἰαὼ Σαβαὼθ" (Iao Sabaoth), and a little further on, "I adjure thee with the holy names Ἰαὼ, Σαβαὼθ, Ἀδοναὶ, Ἐλωί" (Iao, Sabaoth, Adonai, Eloi), from which he would appear to have been either a Jew or a Christian, and, from his frequent prescription of pork, it is most probable that he was a Christian.

== Works ==
Alexander's chief work, titled Twelve Books on Medicine, first appeared in an old, imperfect Latin translation, with the title Alexandri Yatros Practica, which was several times printed. It was first edited in Greek by Jac. Goupylus (Paris 1548, fol.), a beautiful and scarce edition, containing also Rhazae de Pestilentia Libellus ex Syrorum Lingua in Graecam Translatus.

The other work of Alexander that is still extant is a short treatise, Περὶ Ἑλμίνθων, De Lumbricis, which was first published in Greek and Latin by Hieronymus Mercurialis (Venica 1570, 4to). Alexander seems also to have written several other medical works which are now lost. Alexander also is credited with the discovery that depression (melancholia) can lead to homicidal and suicidal tendencies (dianne, hales R. Depression). He expresses his intention of writing a book on Fractures, and also on Wounds of the Head. A treatise on Urine written by him is alluded to by Joannes Actuarius, and he himself mentions a work of his on Diseases of the Eyes, which was translated into Arabic. The other medical treatise on pleurisy, which is said to have been also translated into Arabic, was probably only the sixth book of his great work, which is entirely devoted to the consideration of this disease. Two other medical works which are sometimes attributed to Alexander Trallianus (viz. a Collection of Medical and Physical Problems, and a treatise on Fevers) could also be attributed to Alexander of Aphrodisias.
