= Theophilus Protospatharius =

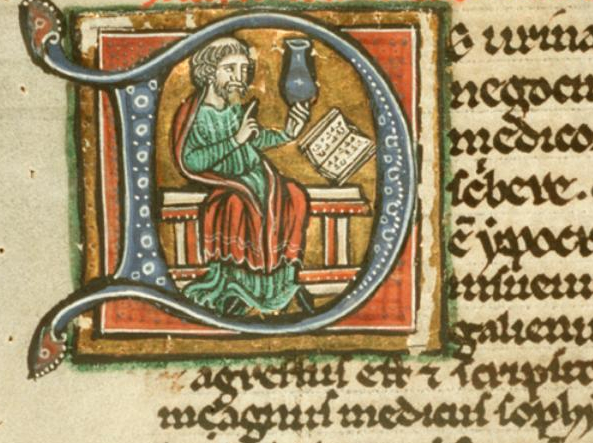
Theophilus Protospatharius, holding a blue-gray uroscopy flask, depicted in a 13th-century manuscript

Theophilus Protospatharius (Greek: Θεόφιλος Πρωτοσπαθάριος; ca. 7th century) was the author of several extant Greek medical works. Nothing is known of his life or the time when he lived. He is generally called "Protospatharius", which seems to have been originally a military title given to the colonel of the bodyguards of the emperor of Constantinople (Spatharioi); but which afterwards became also a high court title, or was associated with the government of provinces and the functions of a judge.

It is conjectured that he lived in the 7th century; that he was the tutor to Stephanus Atheniensis; that he arrived at high professional and political rank; and that at last he embraced the monastic life. All this is, however, quite uncertain; and with respect to his date, it has been supposed that some of the words which he uses belong to a later period than the seventh century; so that he may possibly be the same person who is addressed by the title "Protospatharius " by Photius, in the ninth. He appears to have embraced in some degree the Peripatetic philosophy; but he was certainly a Christian, and expresses himself on all possible occasions like a man of great piety: in his physiological work especially he everywhere points out with admiration the wisdom, power, and goodness of God as displayed in the formation of the human body.

Five works are attributed to him:

- Περὶ τῆς τοῦ Ἀνθρώπου Κατασκευῆς, De Corporis Humani Fabrica. The longest of his works, and is an anatomical and physiological treatise in five books. It contains very little original matter, as it is almost entirely abridged from Galen's great work, "De Usu Partium Corporis Humani," from which however Theophilus now and then differs, and which he sometimes appears to have misunderstood. In the fifth book he has inserted large extracts from Hippocrates' "De Genitura," and "De Natura Pueri." He recommends in several places the dissection of animals, but he does not appear ever to have examined a human body: in one passage he advises the student to dissect an ape, or else a bear, or, if neither of these animals can be procured, to take whatever he can get, "but by all means," he adds, "let him dissect something."
- A treatise Περὶ Οὔρων (Peri ouron), De Urinis, which, in like manner, contains little or nothing that is original, but is a good compendium of what was known on the subject by the ancients, and was highly esteemed in the Middle Ages, serving as a source of Gilles de Corbeil's poem De Urinis.
- A short treatise Περὶ Διαχωρημάτων, De Excrementis Alvinis
- A Commentary on the "Aphorisms" of Hippocrates, which is sometimes attributed to a person named Philotheus:
  - Philothei medici praestantissimi commentaria in aphorismos Hippocratis nunc primum e graeco in latinum sermonem conversa, first Latin translation by Luigi Corado (?), from Mantoua, 1581 : Google digitization; Medic@ digitization.
- A short treatise Περὶ Σφυγμῶν, De Pulsibus. It appears to be quite different from the work on the same subject by Philaretus, which has been sometimes attributed to Theophilus. Also the source for a poem of Gilles de Corbeil.
