= Aëtius of Amida =

6th-century Byzantine physician

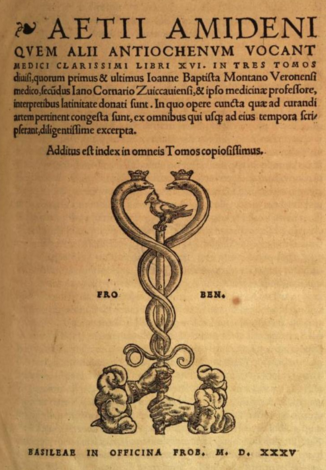
Copy of the first three of his works on medicine. This copy was made in 1535.

Aëtius of Amida (/eɪˈiːʃəs/; Ancient Greek: Ἀέτιος Ἀμιδηνός; Latin: Aëtius Amidenus; fl. mid-5th century to mid-6th century) was a Byzantine Greek physician and medical writer, particularly distinguished by the extent of his erudition. His birth and death years are not known, but his writings appear to date from the end of the 5th century or the beginning of the 6th.

Aëtius was probably a Christian. If so, he would be among the earliest recorded Greek Christian physicians.

He is sometimes confused with Aëtius of Antioch, a famous Arian who lived in the time of the Emperor Julian.

== Life ==
Aëtius was born a Greek and a native of Amida (modern Diyarbakır, Turkey), a city of Mesopotamia, and studied at Alexandria, which was the most famous medical school of the age.

Aëtius mentions Patriarch Cyril of Alexandria, who died in 444, and Petrus archiater, probably the physician of Theodoric the Great, whom he defines as a contemporary, so it appears that he wrote at the very end of the 5th century or the beginning of the 6th. He is in turn quoted by Alexander of Tralles, who lived probably in the middle of the 6th century.

Aëtius traveled and visited the copper mines of Soli, Cyprus, Jericho, and the Dead Sea.

In some manuscripts Aëtius has the title of komēs opsikiou (κόμης ὀψικίου), Latin comes obsequii, which means the chief officer in attendance on the emperor.

== Works ==
Aëtius seems to be the first Greek medical writer among the Christians who gives any specimen of the spells and charms so much in vogue with the Egyptians, such as that of Saint Blaise in removing a bone which sticks in the throat, and another in relation to a fistula.

The division of Aëtius' work Sixteen Books on Medicine (Βιβλία Ἰατρικά Ἑκκαίδεκα) into four tetrabibli was not made by himself, but (as Fabricius observes) was the invention of some modern translator, as his way of quoting his own work is according to the numerical series of the books. Although his work does not contain much original matter, and is heavily indebted to Galen and Oribasius, it is nevertheless one of the most valuable medical remains of antiquity, as being a very judicious compilation from the writings of many authors, many from the Alexandrian Library, whose works have long since been lost.

In the manuscript for book 8.13, the word ἀκμή (acme) is written as ἀκνή, the origin of the modern word acne.

Aëtius is recorded as having developed a concoction for contraception consisting of aloe, wallflower seed, pepper, and saffron. He is also known to have developed an abortifacient mixture, whose contents are not known.

== See also ==
- Aetia gens
