= Paul of Aegina =

7th-century Byzantine physician

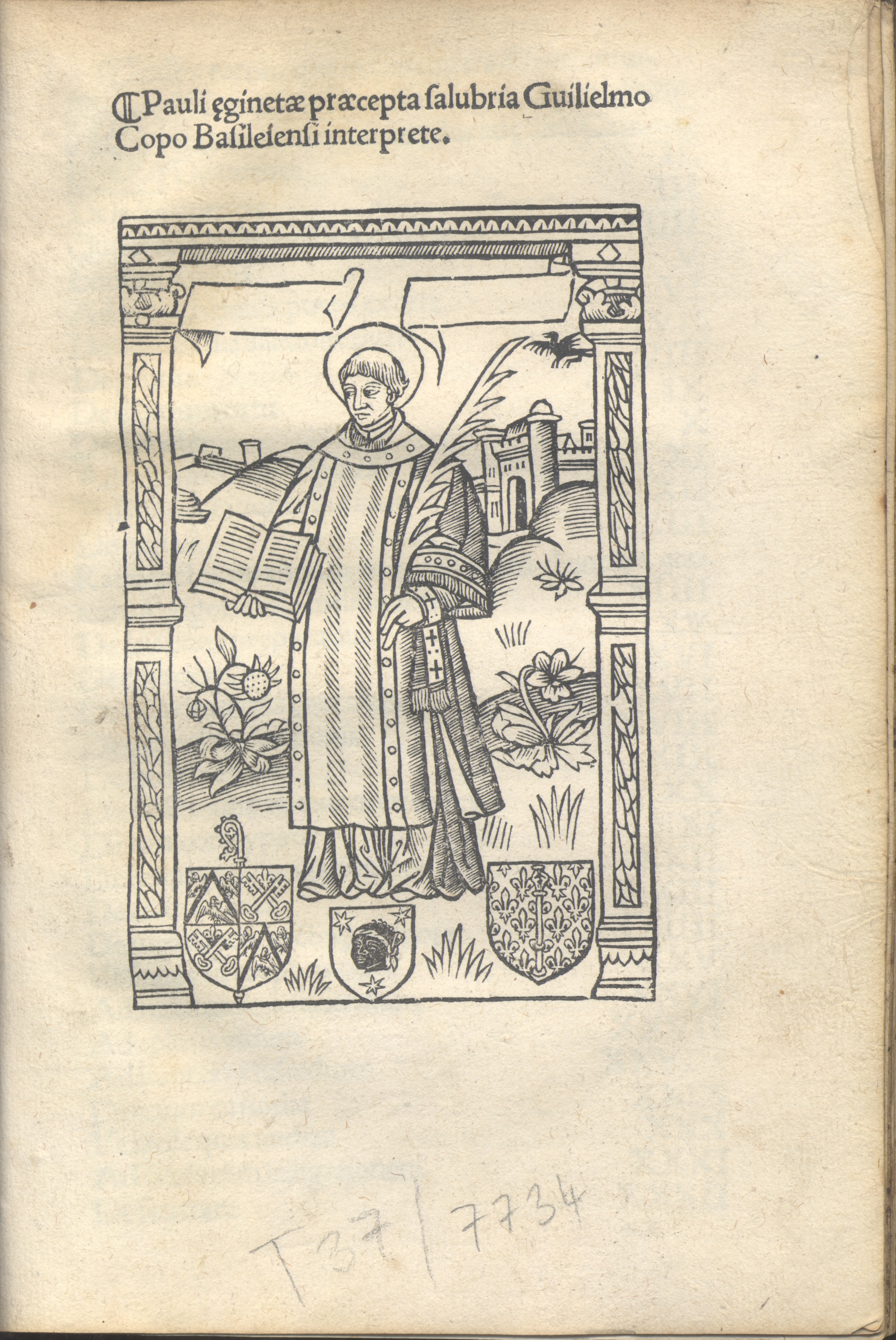
Portrait from a 1510 printing

Paul of Aegina or Paulus Aegineta (Greek: Παῦλος Αἰγινήτης; Aegina, c. 625 – c. 690) was a 7th-century Byzantine Greek physician best known for writing the medical encyclopedia Medical Compendium in Seven Books. He is considered the “Father of Early Medical Writing”. For many years in the Byzantine Empire, his work contained the sum of all available medical knowledge and was unrivaled in its accuracy and completeness.

== Life ==
Nothing is known about his life, except that he was born in the island of Aegina, and that he travelled a good deal, visiting, among other places, Alexandria. He is sometimes called Iatrosophistes and Periodeutes, a word which probably means a physician who travelled from place to place in the exercise of his profession. The exact time when he lived is not known; but, as he quotes Alexander of Tralles, and is himself quoted by Yahya ibn Sarafyun (Serapion the Elder), it is probable that Abu-al-Faraj is correct in placing him in the latter half of the 7th century.

== Works ==
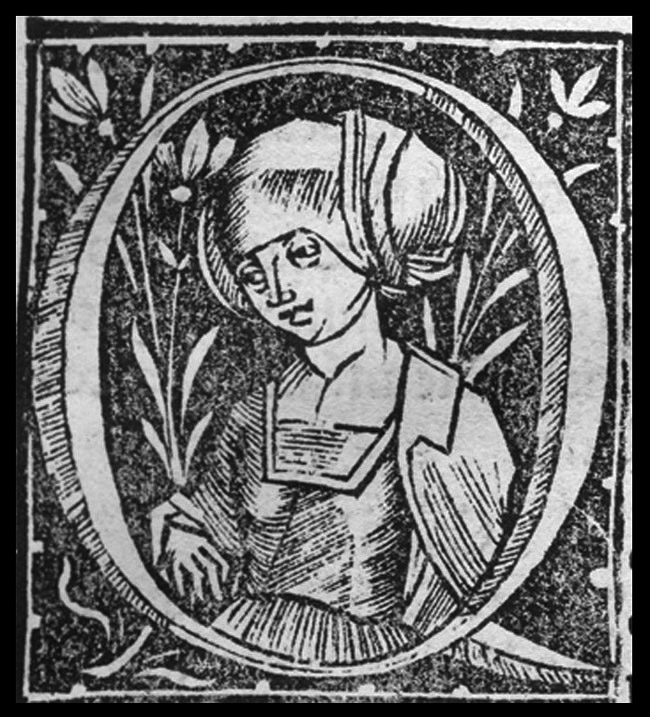
Historiated initial from a 16th-century edition

The Suda says he wrote several medical works, of which the principal one is still extant, with no exact title, but it is commonly called Medical Compendium in Seven Books (Ancient Greek: Ἐπιτομῆς ἰατρικῆς βιβλία ἑπτά, romanized: Epitomês iatrikês biblía heptá, lit. 'Seven books of a medicinal epitome'). This work is chiefly a compilation from earlier writers; indeed its Greek title proclaims that it is an epitome of medicine.

William Alexander Greenhill wrote that his reputation in the Islamic world seems to have been very great, and it is said that he was especially consulted by midwives, whence he received the name of Al-kawabeli or "the Accoucheur". He is said by the Arabic writers to have written a work, De mulierum morbis, and another, De puerulorum vivendi ratione atque curatione. His great work was translated into Arabic by Hunayn ibn Ishaq.

The sixth book on surgery in particular was referenced in Europe and the Arab world throughout the Middle Ages, and is of special interest for surgical history. The whole work in the original Greek was published in Venice in 1528, and another edition appeared in Basel in 1538. Several Latin translations were published. Its first full translation into English was by Francis Adams in 1834.

In this work he describes the operation to fix a hernia similar to modern techniques, writing: "After making the incision to the extent of three fingers' breadth transversely across the tumor to the groin, and removing the membranes and fat, and the peritoneum being exposed in the middle where it is raised up to a point, let the knob of the probe be applied by which the intestines will be pressed deep down. The prominence, then, of the peritoneum, formed on each side of the knob of the probe, are to be joined together by sutures, and then we extract the probe, neither cutting the peritoneum nor removing the testicle, nor anything else, but curing it with applications used for fresh wounds."

== Honours ==
In 1753, botanist Carl Linnaeus published Aeginetia, which is a genus of flowering plants belonging to the family Orobanchaceae and native mostly to tropical Asia. It was named in Paul of Aegina's honour.
