= Medieval poetry =

Forms of poetry, genre lyric and epic in the medieval era

Poetry took numerous forms in medieval Europe, for example, lyric and epic poetry. The troubadours, trouvères, and the minnesänger are known for composing their lyric poetry about courtly love usually accompanied by an instrument.

Among the most famous of secular poetry is Carmina Burana, a manuscript collection of 254 poems. Twenty-four poems of Carmina Burana were later set to music by German composer Carl Orff in 1936.

== Examples of medieval poetry ==
Old English religious poetry includes the poem Christ by Cynewulf and the poem The Dream of the Rood, preserved in both manuscript form and on the Ruthwell Cross. We do have some secular poetry; in fact a great deal of medieval literature was written in verse, including the Old English epic Beowulf. Scholars are fairly sure, based on a few fragments and on references in historic texts, that much lost secular poetry was set to music, and was spread by traveling minstrels, or bards, across Europe. Thus, the few poems written eventually became ballads or lays, and never made it to being recited without song or other music.

=== Medieval Latin literature ===
In medieval Latin, while verse in the old quantitative meters continued to be written, a new more popular form called the sequence arose, which was based on accentual metres in which metrical feet were based on stressed syllables rather than vowel length. These metres were associated with Christian hymnody.

However, much secular poetry was also written in Latin. Some poems and songs, like the Gambler's Mass (officio lusorum) from the Carmina Burana, were parodies of Christian hymns, while others were student melodies: folksongs, love songs and drinking ballads. The famous commercium song Gaudeamus igitur is one example. There are also a few narrative poems of the period, such as the unfinished epic Ruodlieb, which tells us the story of a knight's adventures.

==== Topics ====
- Carmina Burana
- Cambridge Songs
- goliard
- Hiberno-Latin
- Gregorian chant
  - Dies Irae
  - Pange Lingua

==== Medieval Latin poets ====
- Adam of Saint Victor
- St Ambrose
- St Thomas Aquinas
- The Archpoet
- St Bernard of Cluny
- St Bonaventure
- St Columba
- Dante Alighieri
- St Hildegard of Bingen
- Hrabanus Maurus
- Paul the Deacon
- Petrarch
- Peter Abelard
- Peter of Blois
- Thomas of Celano
- Walafrid Strabo
- Walter of Châtillon
- Chaucer
- Gottfried von Hagenau

== Medieval vernacular literature ==
One of the features of the Renaissance which marked the end of the medieval period is the rise in the use of the vernacular or the language of the common people for literature. The compositions in these local languages were often about the legends and history of the areas in which they were written which gave the people some form of national identity. Epic poems, sagas, chansons de geste and acritic songs (songs of heroic deeds) were often about the great men, real or imagined, and their achievements like Arthur, Charlemagne and El Cid.

The formality which Latin had gained through its long written history was often not present in the vernaculars which began producing poetry, and so new techniques and structures emerged, often derived from oral literature. This is particularly noticeable in the Germanic languages, which, unlike the Romance languages, are not direct descendants from Latin. Alliterative verse, where many of the stressed words in each line start with the same sound, was often used in the local poetry of that time. Other features of vernacular poetry of this time include kennings, internal rhyme, and slant rhyme. Indeed, Latin poetry traditionally used meter rather than rhyme and only began to adopt rhyme after being influenced by these new poems.

=== Bodies of work ===
==== The Matter of Britain ====
- King Arthur
- Camelot
- Merlin
- Avalon
- Béroul
- Chrétien de Troyes
- Geoffrey of Monmouth
- Marie de France
- Robert de Boron
- Thomas of Britain

==== The Matter of France ====
- chanson de geste
- paladin
- Charlemagne
- Charles Martel
- Saracen
- Chanson de Roland
- Garin de Monglane
- Doon de Mayence
- Huon de Bordeaux
- Renaud de Montauban

==== The Matter of Rome ====
- Roman d'Alixandre (Alexander Romance)
- Roman de Troie
- Roman de Thèbes
- Eneas
- Troilus and Criseyde

=== Romance languages ===
==== Old French ====
- trouvère
- Anglo-Norman literature
- Roman de la Rose
- Chanson d'aventure
- Debate poetry

==== Occitan ====
- troubadour
- courtly love
- Occitan literature

==== Catalan ====
- Ausiàs March
- Ramon Llull
- Andreu Febrer

==== Italian ====
- Dante Alighieri
  - The Divine Comedy
- Petrarch
- Francis of Assisi

==== Spanish ====
- Juan Ruiz
- El Cid

==== Galician-Portuguese ====
- João Zorro
- Martim Codax

==== French ====
- Guillaume de Machaut
- Jean de Meung
- Christine de Pizan

=== Medieval Georgian Poetry ===
- Shota Rustaveli

The Knight in the Panther's Skin

- Demetrius I

Shen Khar Venakhi (tr: "You are vineyard")

- Ioane Shavteli

Abdulmesiani (tr: "Slave of the Messiah")

=== Germanic languages ===
==== Alliterative verse ====
- Beowulf
- Elder Edda
- Younger Edda
- skald
- scop

==== Medieval English poetry ====
- Middle English
- Geoffrey Chaucer
  - The Canterbury Tales
- William Langland
  - Piers Plowman
- Everyman
- Sir Orfeo
- Book of the Civilized Man
- The Pearl Poet
  - Sir Gawain and the Green Knight

==== Medieval German poetry ====
- minnesang
- Walther von der Vogelweide
- The Nibelungenlied

=== Medieval Greek poetry ===
- Acritic songs
  - Digenis Acritas
  - Song of Armouris

=== Medieval Celtic poetry ===
==== Irish ====
- Metrical Dindshenchas
- Lebor Gabála Érenn
- Táin Bó Cúailnge
- Contention of the bards

==== Welsh ====
- Aneirin
  - Llyfr Aneirin
  - Y Gododdin

Canu Heledd

- Dafydd ap Gwilym
- Llywarch Hen
- Taliesin
  - Llyfr Taliesin
  - Armes Prydein
  - Cad Goddeu
  - Preiddeu Annwfn
