= Digenes Akritas =

12th-century Byzantine Greek epic poem

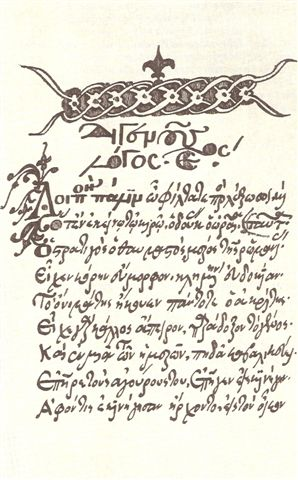
- Manuscript of the epic of Digenes Akritas, National Library of Greece.
- Original title: Διγενῆς Ἀκρίτας
- Written: 12th century
- Country: Byzantine Empire
- Language: Medieval Greek
- Series: Acritic songs
- Genre(s): Epic, Romance

Digenes Akritas (Latinised as Acritas; Greek: Διγενῆς Ἀκρίτας) (Note: Greek pronunciation: [ðiʝeˈnis aˈkritas]; Digenes may also be transliterated as Digenis. Variants of Akritas include Akrites or Akritis (Ἀκρίτης).) is a medieval Greek romantic epic that emerged in the 12th-century Byzantine Empire. It is the lengthiest and most famous of the acritic songs, Byzantine folk poems celebrating the lives and exploits of the Akritai, the inhabitants and frontier guards of the empire's eastern Anatolian provinces. The acritic songs represented the remnants of an ancient epic cycle in Byzantium and, due to their long oral transmission throughout the empire, the identification of precise references to historical events may be only conjectural. Set during the Arab-Byzantine wars, the poem reflects the interactions, along with the military and cultural conflicts of the two polities. The epic consists of between 3,000 and 4,000 lines and it has been pieced together following the discovery of several manuscripts. An extensive narrative text, it is often thought of as the only surviving Byzantine work truly qualifying as epic poetry. Written in a form of vernacular Greek, it is regarded as one of its earliest examples, as well as the starting point of Modern Greek literature.

The epic details the life of the eponymous hero, Basil, whose epithet Digenes Akritas ("two-blood border lord") alludes to his mixed Greek and Arab descent. The text is divided into two halves: the first half, epic in tone, details the lives and encounter of Basil's parents; his mother, a Byzantine noblewoman from the Doukas family named Eirene, and his father, an Arab emir named Mousour who, after abducting Eirene in a raid, converted to Christianity and married her. The second half, in a more romantic atmosphere, discusses Basil's early childhood and later, often from a first-person point of view, his struggles and acts of heroism on the Byzantine borders. Allusions to Greek mythological elements, including the Hercules-like childhood of Basil, and his affair with the Amazon warrior Maximo, also appear throughout the text. Though a legendary figure, it has been suggested that inspiration for the hero may have derived from the 11th-century Cappadocian general and emperor Romanos Diogenes.

The epic of Digenes Akritas continued to be read and passed down in the post Byzantine period, with the most recent surviving manuscripts dating to the 17th century. The character became the archetype of the ideal medieval hero featuring in a number of folk songs popular throughout the Greek-speaking world, most prominently in Crete, Cyprus, and Asia Minor. The epic would go on to have significant impact on the culture of modern Greece, particularly on folk music, the arts, and literature.

== History ==
=== Manuscripts ===
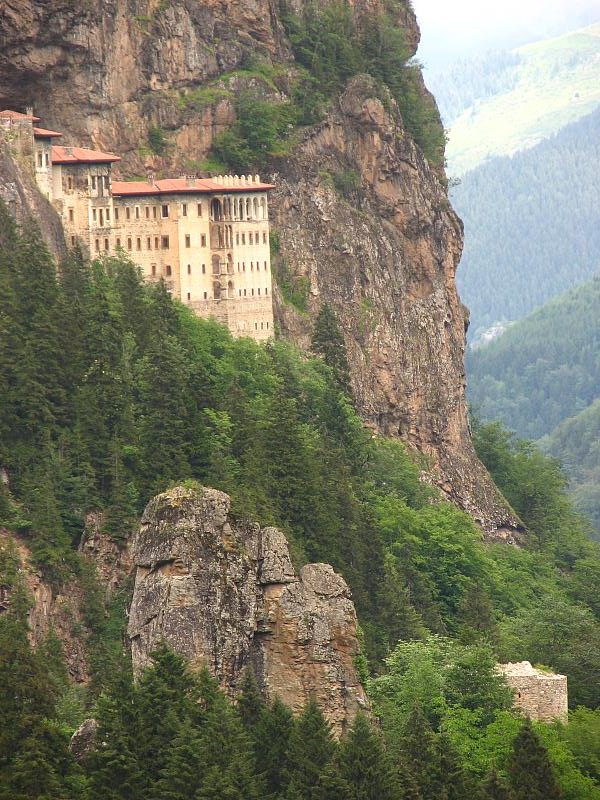
The Sumela Monastery in Trebizond, where the first manuscript was discovered in 1868.

The epic of Digenes Akritas is most commonly thought to have been first compiled around the 12th century AD building on earlier material which was primarily derived from oral sources. The existence of the epic during this time is referenced at a Ptochoprodromic poem to emperor Manuel I Komnenos under the name "New Akrites". During the 19th and 20th centuries, a total of six manuscripts of the epic became available, with the oldest surviving piece dating back to the late 1200s–early 1300s. Each of the surviving manuscripts constituted a different version of the same medieval story. Comparative evidence suggests that word-for-word precision was a rare instance in the Byzantine period and it was typical for copies of literary works to involve some degree of variation.

- Trebizond manuscript (3182 lines, Sumela monastery, c. 16th century)
- Andros manuscript (or Andros–Athens, 4778 lines, 16th century)
- Grottaferrata manuscript (3749 lines, Greek monastery of Grottaferrata, 13th–14th century)
- Escorial manuscript (1867 lines, Escorial library, 15th–16th century)
- Oxford manuscript (3094 lines, Lincoln College, finished in 1670)
- Andros manuscript (also Andros–Thessaloniki, or Paschales MS, finished in 1632)

The existence of more manuscripts has been attested in the 18th and 19th centuries, but their location remains unknown. Those include a now lost manuscript once seen at the Xeropotamou monastery of Athos in the 18th century. The oldest two are the 'El Escorial' and 'Grottaferrata' versions, from the names of the libraries in which the respective manuscripts are held. While the form (or forms) in which the text has survived is not the product of oral composition, it has nevertheless retained a considerable number of features of its oral origins. The common core of the two versions preserved in the Esc and Gro manuscripts goes back to the twelfth century. The two manuscripts differ greatly, with the Gro version being more well-organized, while the Esc version is closer to the language of everyday speech with several gaps and metric irregularities. The text of Esc appears to be closer to the original composition, while Gro represents a version that is heavily marked by learned reworking. Both texts give enchanting descriptions of the life of the martial societies of the border regions of the empire, while in the figure of Digenes are concentrated the legends that had accumulated around local heroes. The Esc version is the superior of the two in respect of the power and immediacy of the battle scenes and austerity of style. The epic descriptions of the mounted knights and battles are marked by drama, a swift pace and lively visual detail.

There exists an Old Slavonic version of Digenis Akritas under the title Deeds of the Brave Men of Old (Дѣяніе прежнихъ временъ храбрыхъ человѣкъ), which is adapted from a line in the Grottaferrata manuscript. The Slavonic version is often called the Devgenievo deianie, but this title is not found in manuscripts. It contains both straightforward translation and free retelling of the Greek version in the Grottaferrata manuscript. It was produced in a bilingual Greek–South Slavic milieu, probably in Macedonia under the Serbian Empire (14th century) or its successors. It has features suggestive of oral-formulaic composition.

=== Discovery and publication ===
The existence of the epic of Digenes Akritas remained unknown prior to the second half of the 19th century when most of the manuscripts were discovered and published. Until then, the hero – variously referred to as Digenes, Constantine, or Giannis (John) – was only known through the songs and ballads of the Acritic Cycle that had been preserved in the oral tradition of the Greek-speaking world and had been collected and published around the same time. The first manuscript of the epic was discovered in 1868 at the Sumela Monastery of Trebizond and was first published in 1875. It was soon followed by the Andros manuscript which was discovered in 1878 and published in 1881. A rhymed version from the Lincoln College of Oxford was published in 1880; the version had the advantage of being signed by its writer, a monk from Chios by the name Ignatios Petritzes, in 1670. The oldest surviving manuscript was found in the Greek monastery of Grottaferrata, near Frascati, in 1879 and was published in 1892. A prose version written by Meletios Vlastos of Chios in 1632 was discovered in Andros in 1898 and it wasn't published until 1928. The incomplete Madrid version, published in 1912, was discovered in the Escorial library of Spain in 1904.

== Overview ==
=== Acritic cycle ===
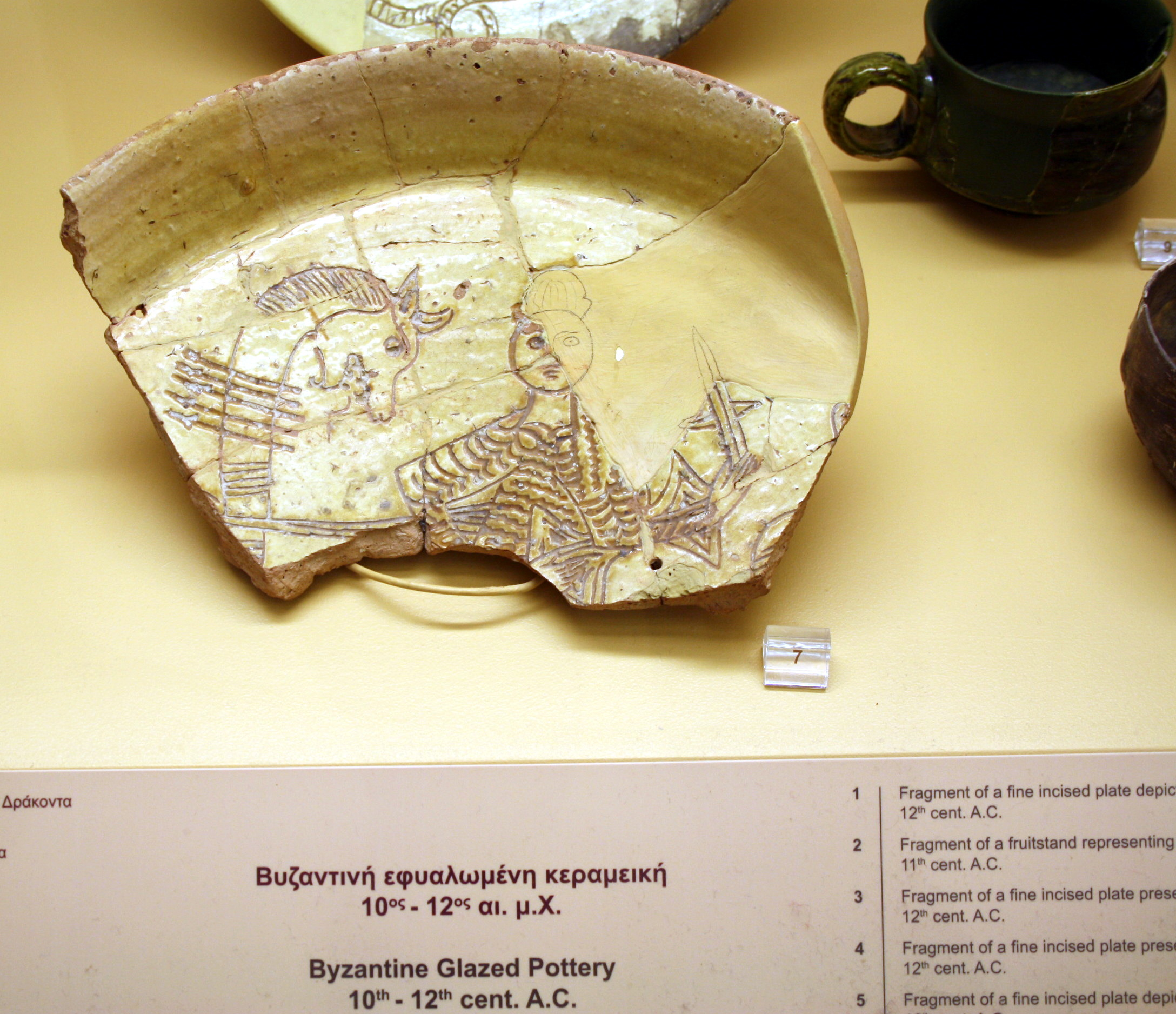
Digenes Akritas bearing a sword next to the slain dragon. Fragment of a 12th-century Byzantine plate. Ancient Agora Museum, Athens.

The names 'Digenis' or 'Akritas' (rarely found together) have long been widespread throughout the Greek-speaking world representing heroes of folk-songs that are particularly popular in Crete, Cyprus, and Asia Minor. Before the discovery of the manuscripts, the protagonist of the epic was only known through the Acritic songs; narrative vernacular songs or ballads typically in political verse that originated from the Byzantine period and reflected episodes and characters associated with the epic-romance of Digenes Akritas. Collected primarily from 19th century oral sources, the best of those songs were found on the fringes of Asia Minor, like Pontus, and Cyprus. In the acritic tradition, the warriors are presented as paragons of elegance and nobility (Greek: λεβεντιά); they reside in luxurious houses typically on the edges of the Christian world, and sometimes bear names of the Byzantine aristocracy.

The Byzantine acritic songs represented the remnants of an ancient epic tradition that appears to predate the epic of Digenes itself. The songs have been subjected to the transformation of up to a thousand years old oral transmission making the identification of historical events and individuals only presumptive. The similarities between the songs and the epic are likely to have arisen as both drew inspiration from a common pool of folk material. Those songs that appear closer to the surviving versions of the epic are more likely to have been influenced by it. The acritic saga appears to loosely draw on four bodies of Greek myth; Heracles, the Argonauts, Thebes, and Troy. The fusion of folklore with Christian tradition is also a typical motif in the works of the acritic cycle. Some recurrent elements include the exploits of particularly endowed warriors, or a speaking bird usually bringing about the desired closure to a troubling story. Fine examples of the Acritic songs that feature prominent Anatolian elements include The Song of Armouris, The Son of Andronikos, Porphyris, The Bridge of Arta, and more.

The most famous episodes of Digenes' life that appear in the acritic songs include the abduction of his future bride (Greek: Η απαγωγή της κόρης του στρατηγού; "The abduction of the general's daughter"), the building of his house (Ο Ακρίτης κάστρον έχτιζεν; "Acritas built a castle"), his encounter with the beast (Ο δράκος; "The dragon"), and his death (Ο χάρος μαύρα εφόρεσεν; "Charon dressed in black"). The hero's dramatic battle with Charon, an element that features prominently in the acritic songs, does not occur earlier in the epic. Politis has interpreted this theme as a symbol of the struggle between the Christian Greek population and its Muslim masters during the Turkish conquests of Byzantines lands.

==== Imagery ====
Episodes from the Acritic cycle, as well as the epic of Digenes Akritas, appear on more than 100 ceramic plates that have been found in various locations, from Contantinople and Thessalonica, to Athens and Corinth; the oldest of those dating back to the 12th century. A painting on a Corinthian plate depicts Digenes wooing the Amazon Maximo, while a fragment of a plate from the Ancient Agora of Athens depicts the sword-bearing warrior next to the dragon that has been slain with five darts (Greek: πέντε κοντάρια, pente kontaria; a popular theme in the Acritic ballads with no counterpart in the epic). 35 of the plates depict the hero wearing a pleated kilt, known as the podea, and 26 have him killing the dragon. Some of those iconographic elements, like the outfit of the warrior and the heroic deeds, were also attributed to other lesser known akritai of the folk ballads and, as such, the identification of a depicted hero with Digenes may at times be presumptive. A much more recognizable scene from the epic of Akritas is found at a relief from saint Cathrine's in Thessalonica showing an armoured figure tearing apart the jaws of a lion; a scene reminiscent of Digenes' youth in the epic.

=== The epic ===
==== Historical context and composition ====
The eastern frontier of the Byzantine Empire during the Arab-Byzantine wars. Basil's mother, Eirene, originated from the region of Cappadocia.

The Arab–Byzantine wars, the conflicts between the Byzantine Empire and the Arab-Muslim caliphates that lasted from the 7th century to the early 11th century, provide the historical context for the Byzantine heroic poetry written in Medieval Greek. The Byzantine Akritai of this period were a military class responsible for safeguarding the frontier regions of the imperial territory from external enemies and freebooting adventurers who operated on the fringes of the empire. Each of the surviving versions give an insight into the lives of the wealthy frontier guards of this period. The first half of the epic reflects personalities and events from 9th- and 10th-century Byzantine history, including references to aristocratic families like Doukas and Kinnamos, while the second half appears to be visually timeless. Asia Minor is regarded as the origin place of the story. Based on details of geography and titulature, the general worldview as presented in the whole text is confirmed to predate the Turkish presence in the peninsula.

The original composition of Digenes Akritas, judging by its themes, including the eventual Arab-Byzantine reconciliation, may date to a later period than the Song of Armouris (11th century), in which the features of oral epic composition also appear more marked. The most possible date of its composition is the 12th century during the revival of interest in ancient Greek romance which, in turn, gave rise to the genre of Byzantine romance. During this time, there seems to have been a conscious effort to employ classical literary genres as objects of imitation (mimesis), with the most striking revivals being that of ancient romance and epic poetry. Though the Byzantines never stopped reading Homer, poetic composition in epic style fully resumed in the 12th century, when the Ptochoprodromic poems to John II represent the earliest medieval attempts to celebrate the exploits of an emperor in Homeric style. The text of Digenes Akritas appears in line with 12th-century literary trends, bearing thematic affinities with contemporary romances and linguistic and metrical affinities with the Ptochoprodromic poems.

==== Storyline ====
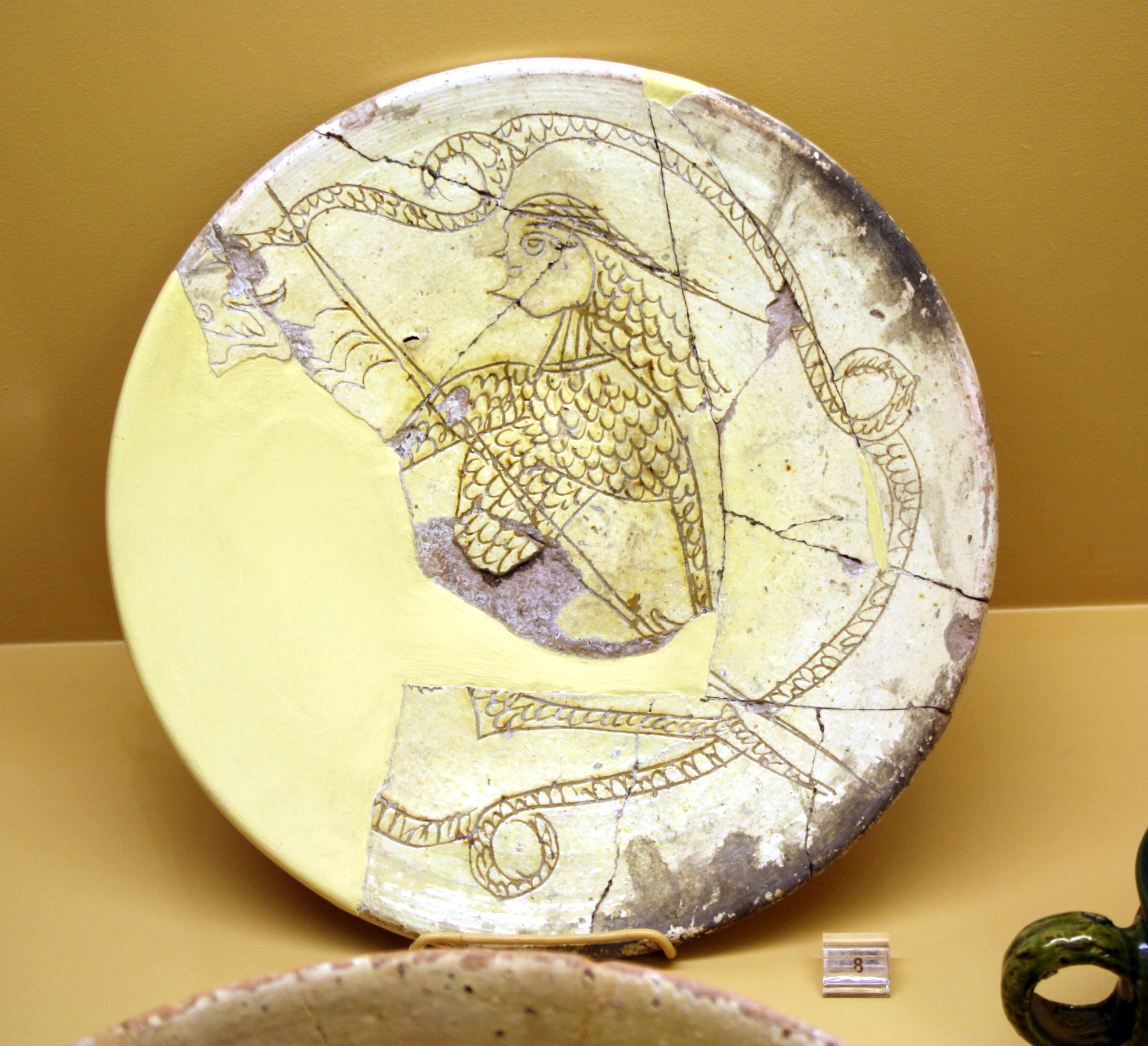
Digenes Akritas and the dragon. 12th century Byzantine plate. Ancient Agora Museum, Athens.

The work comprises two parts; the first part, the "Lay of the Emir", bears more obviously the characteristics of epic poetry and narrates the story of Digenes' parents. In the historical region of Cappadocia of the Byzantine Empire (Greek: Ῥωμανία, Rhomanía), a certain Doukas prince named Andronikos and his wife Anna, who already had five sons, prayed for a daughter. When their daughter Eirene was born, the soothsayers foretold that she would one day be carried away from the empire by an Arabian emir. From a young age Eirene was put in a palace and grew surrounded by a company of guards and nursemaids. One day when her father was away at an expedition, Eirene left the palace with her maids and went for a picnic in the countryside. At the time, a young prince of Syria named Mousour who had invaded Cappadocia found the princess and her companions and carried them away. When her five brothers became aware of the incident, they left the empire in search of their sister. Outfought, the emir surrendered to the brothers and confessed his love for Eirene promising to became a Christian if they allow them to marry. Mousour was eventually baptized and, after their marriage, Eirene gave birth to their son who was named Basil (Greek: Βασίλειος, Basileios) Digenes Akritas.

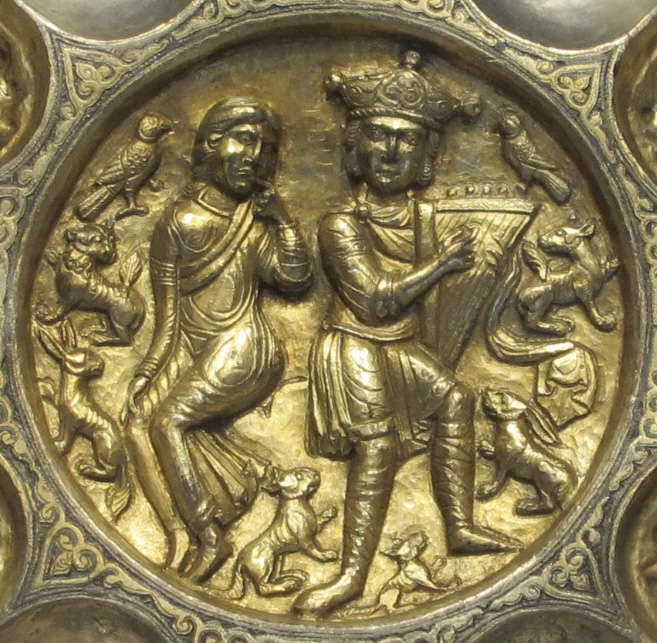
1150-1159, Armenian Kingdom of Cilicia. Artwork on a silver bowl showing Digenes Akritas playing a rota for his wife Eudocia.

The second part of the work begins with the development of the young hero and his superhuman feats of bravery and strength. As a boy, Digenes goes hunting with his father and, like young Hercules, learns to defeat wild animals unarmed; he kills several animals with his bare hands, including a lion and two bears. As a young man, he takes on the so-called apelatai (ἀπελάται), a group of freebooting bandits –sometimes enemies of the akritai–, and then defeats their three leaders in single combat. Growing up, Digenes falls in love and elopes with Eudocia (Ευδοκία), the daughter of a Byzantine general and, after he manages to defeat his persecutors –Eudocia's brothers and their soldiers– he marries her. Living with his new family on the borders of the empire, he pacifies the region by hunting down bandits. His strength became notorious throughout the empire. The Byzantine emperor himself pays a visit to Digenes to witness his accomplishments and physical strength. Digenes narrates in first-person of his previous adventures, including an instance where he rescued his bride from a dragon. In his duel with the amazingly strong Amazon warrior Maximο, Digenes defeats his opponent, but she eventually gets him to engage with her in an extramarital affair. Having defeated all his enemies and brought peace to the borders, Digenes builds a luxurious palace by the Euphrates where he ends his days peacefully.

=== Local traditions ===
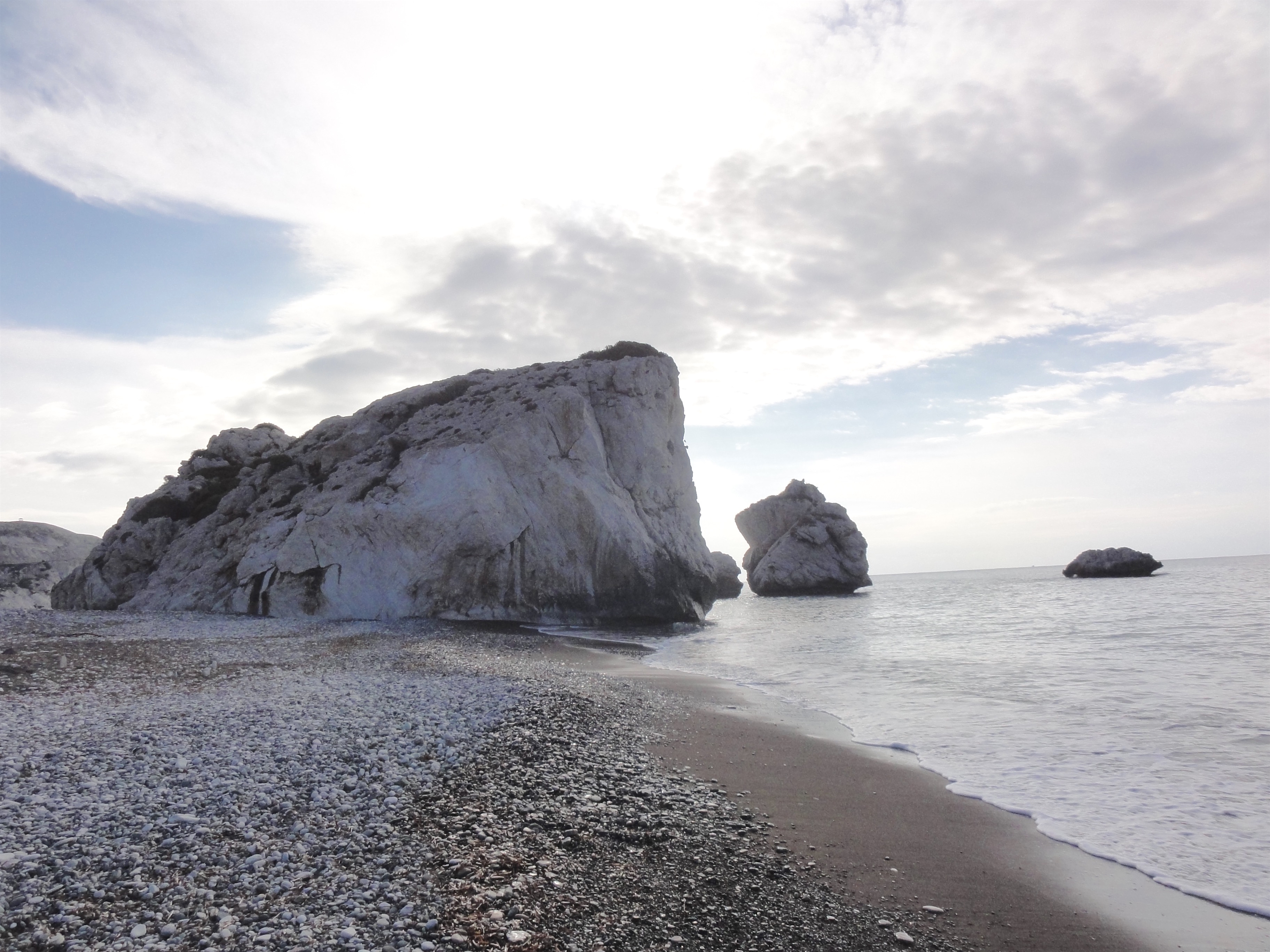
The "Rock of the Greek" which was thrown in Paphos by Digenes, according to Cypriot folklore.

Historically, the island of Cyprus served the Byzantine Empire as a stronghold during the Islamic expansion and had a key role as a border between Christian and Islamic cultures. The island's geographic location turned it into an important center of production and revision of Byzantine heroic songs. Cypriot heroic folk songs have had significant impact in preserving the island's Byzantine culture over time and are today a valuable resource for scholars to obtain a better understanding of the Byzantine society and folk beliefs. Digenes, whose strength was often elevated to supernatural status, was recognized in local Cypriot and Cretan traditions as the protector of the islands; legend has it that Digenes would grab hold of the Pentadaktylos mountain range north of Nicosia leaping over to Anatolia and then to Crete in pursuit of Saracen raiders. The peak of the Pentadaktylos ("Five Fingers") mountain range was said to represent the imprint of Digenes' hand, while his footprint was said to be visible on the Psiloritis mountain in Crete. According to another legend, Digenes once threw a large rock across Cyprus to keep off the invading Saracen ships. The rock, that was hurled from the Troodos mountains, landed in Paphos at the site of Aphrodite's birthplace, that is known to this day as Petra Tou Romiou ("Rock of the Greek").

== Form ==
=== Language ===
The text of Digenes Akritas is one of the earliest examples of Byzantine folk literature and is generally regarded as the starting point of modern Greek literature. It is written in a vernacular form of medieval Greek that is more familiar to modern-day speakers, compared to the more conservative language of the Byzantine ecclesiastical litterateurs and chroniclers. The text includes many features that are in line with developments in the Demotic Greek language and are characteristic of popular speech, including elision, aphaeresis, crasis, and synizesis. From an overall impression, the text appears to be of modern syntax, while by contrast its morphology remains quite traditional, with modern variations observed mainly in verb endings.

=== Style ===
Digenes Akritas is an epic poem, although it is not in a pure epic-heroic style. A hybrid of oral epic and literary romance, it comprises two parts; the first one is epic in tone, while the second has the atmosphere of a romance. It is an extensive narrative text composed in fifteen syllable blank verse, henceforth the standard metre of Greek poetry, now with predominantly iambic rhythm. The poem does not diverge from the standard political verse of popular Byzantine literature and rhyming occurs rarely. Each line holds its own and every hemistich is carefully balanced. The poem flows, is cadential, with no cacophonies, and very scarce sound repetitions.

Below is an excerpt from the translation of the Escorial manuscript, lines 32–55, by E. M. Jeffreys (pp. 240–3):

Line	Original	Translation
[32]	Εὐθὺς ἐκαβαλίκευσαν, 'ς τὸν κάμπον κατεβαίνουν.	They mounted at once and they came to the battlefield.
[33]	Ὡς δράκοντες ἐσύριζαν καὶ ὡς λέοντες ἐβρυχοῦντα	They hissed like dragons, they roared like lions,
[34]	καὶ ὡς ἀετοί ἐπέτουντα, καὶ ἐσμίξασιν οἱ δύο·	they soared like eagles, and the two clashed.
[35]	καὶ τότε νὰ ἰδῆς πόλεμον καλῶν παλληκαρίων.	And then you could see a fight between fine brave youths.
[36]	Καὶ ἀπὸ τῆς μάχης τῆς πολλῆς κροῦσιν δι|ασυντόμως·	In the heat of the battle they struck continuously,
[37]	καὶ απὸ τὸν κτύπον τὸν πολὺν καὶ ἀπὸ τὸ δὸς καὶ λάβε	and from the great clashing and the cut and thrust
[38]	οἱ κάμποι φόβον εἴχασιν καὶ τὰ βουνιὰ ἀηδονοῦσαν,	the plains grew fearful and the mountains re-echoed,
[39]	τὰ δένδρη ἐξεριζὠνουντα καὶ ὁ ἥλιος ἐσκοτίσθη.	trees were uprooted and the sun was darkened.
[40]	Tὸ αἷμαν ἐκατέρεεν εἰς τὰ σκαλόλουρά των	Blood flowed down over their horse-trappings
[41]	καὶ ὁ ἵδρος τους ἐξέβαινεν ἀπάνω ἀπ' τὰ λουρίκια.	and their sweat ran out over their breastplates.
[42]	Ἦτον <καὶ> γὰρ τοῦ Κωνσταντῆ γοργότερος ὁ μαῦρος,	Constantine's black horse was speedier,
[43]	καὶ θαυμαστὸς νεώτερος ἦτον ὁ καβελάρης·	and its rider was a marvellous young man.
[44]	κατέβηκε εἰς τὸν αμιρὰν καὶ κρούει του ραβδέα	He charged at the emir and struck him a blow with his stick
[45]	καὶ τότε ἐχέρισε ὁ ἀμιρὰς νὰ τρέμη καὶ νὰ φεύγη.	and then the emir began to tremble and flee.
[46]	Σαρακηνὸς ἐλάλησεν τὸν ἀμιρὰν τῆς γλώσσης:	A Saracen addressed the emir in his own tongue:
[47]	«Πιάσε, μούλε, τὸν ἄγουρον, ταχέως νὰ τὸν νικήσης,	"Seize the youngster, my lord, and grab a quick victory,
[48]	μὴ εἰς σύντομόν του γύρισμα πάρη τὴν κεφαλὴν σου·	so that he doesn't take your head off with his sudden turn.
[49]	αὑτὸς καλὰ σ' ἐσέβηκεν, τώρα νὰ σὲ γκρεμνίση.	He has made a fine attack on you and now he might finish you off.
[50]	Ἐγώ, μούλε, οὐ τὸ ἐγνοιάζομαι νὰ τὸν καταπονέσης,	I don't think, my lord, you are going to do him much harm,
[51]	ἀλλὰ μὴ τὸ καυχάσεται ὅτι ἔτρεψεν φουσάτα.»	but don't let him boast that he routed an army."
[52]	Καὶ ὁ αμιρὰς ὡς τὸ ἤκουσεν, μακρέα τὸν ἀποξέβην,	When the emir heard this, he withdrew some way from the youth,
[53]	ἔριψεν τὸ κοντάριν του καὶ δάκτυλόν τοῦ δείχνει	he threw away his spear and showed him his finger,
[54]	καὶ μετὰ τοῦ δακτύλου του τοιοῦτον λόγον λέγει:	and with this gesture he said these words:
[55]	«Ζῆς, νὰ χαίρεσαι, νεώτερε, ἐδικόν σου ἔν' τὸ νίκος.»	"May you live and rejoice, young man, victory is yours."

== Legacy ==
The story of Digenes Akritas has left scattered signs of influence outside of the Byzantine world, including in Arabic and Slavic literature, but its greater impact has been in modern Greek culture. The protagonist, variously known as simply 'Digenis' or 'Akritas', became the archetype of the ideal medieval Greek hero; the character frequently appears in traditional Greek folk-songs, is often represented in art, and has been used in modern literature as a symbol of medieval Hellenism and Byzantine heroism. Scholars have seen the influence of Digenes Akritas on the title and story of Patrick White's 1979 novel The Twyborn Affair . The tale of Digenes continued to be read and enjoyed in later centuries, as the text survives in various versions dating to as late as the 17th century. The epic tale of Digenes corresponds in many ways to the cycle of much shorter acritic songs, particularly from Anatolia, Cyprus and Crete, some of which survive until the present day. In the later tradition, Digenes is eventually defeated only by Death in the figure of Thanatos/Charon, who had reportedly already wrestled with Heracles, after a fierce single combat on "the marble threshing floors". The story of Digenes Akritas defeated by Death personally was used as the basis of a Russian bylina (a folk ballad) about Anika the Warrior.

== See also ==
- Battal Gazi
- Acritic songs
- Byzantine romance
- Song of Armouris
- Belthandros and Chrysantza
- Daredevils of Sassoun

== Sources ==
- Jeffreys, Elizabeth (1998). Digenis Akritis: the Grottaferrata and Escorial Versions. Cambridge University Press. ISBN 978-0-521-39472-7.
- Mavrogordato, John (1970). Digenes Akrites: edited with an introduction, translation and commentary. Oxford University Press.
- Kazhdan, Alexander (1991). The Oxford Dictionary of Byzantium. Vol. 1. Oxford University Press.
- Beaton, Roderick (1996). The Medieval Greek Romance. Psychology Press. ISBN 0415120330.
- Hadjivassiliou, Vangelis; Kaklamanis, Stefanos; Kotzia, Elisabeth; Petsopoulos, Stavros; Tsirimokou, Elisabeth; Yatromanolakis, Yoryis, eds. (2001). Greece: Books and Writers. Athens, Greece: National Book Centre of Greece, Ministry of Culture. ISBN 960-7894-29-4.
- Reitz, Christiane; Finkmann, Simone (2019). Structures of Epic Poetry. De Gruyter. ISBN 9783110492002.
- Merry, Bruce (2004). Encyclopedia of Modern Greek Literature. Westport, CT: Greenwood Press. ISBN 0313308136.
- Horrocks, Geoffrey (2014). Greek: A History of the Language and Its Speakers. Wiley. ISBN 9781118785157.
- Beaton, Roderick and David Ricks (edd.). Digenes Akrites: New Approaches to Byzantine Heroic Poetry. Aldershot: King's College London, 1993. ISBN 0-86078-395-2. Articles by Magdalino, Alexiou, Jeffreys, Mackridge and others.
- Jeffreys, Elizabeth. Digenis Akritis. Cambridge: CUP, 1998. ISBN 0-521-39472-4 (hardback). Escorial & Grottaferrata versions with parallel English translation.
- Bartikyan, Hrach. "Armenia and Armenians in the Byzantine Epic," in Digenes Akrites: New Approaches to Byzantine Heroic Poetry (Centre for Hellenic Studies, King's College London). David Ricks (ed.) Brookfield, Vt.: Variorum, 1993 ISBN 0-86078-395-2.
- Kyriacou, Chrysovalantis (2020). The Byzantine Warrior Hero Cypriot Folk Songs as History and Myth, 965–1571. Lexington Books. ISBN 9781793621993.
- Houghton, Robert (2022). Teaching the Middle Ages Through Modern Games Using, Modding and Creating Games for Education and Impact. De Gruyter. ISBN 9783110712032.
- Beaton, Roderick; Ricks, David (2017). Digenes Akrites, New Approaches to Byzantine Heroic Poetry. Taylor & Francis. ISBN 9781351944175.
- Caragounis, Chrys C. (2004). The Development of Greek and the New Testament, Morphology, Syntax, Phonology, and Textual Transmission. Mohr Siebeck. ISBN 978-3-16-148290-8.
