= Belthandros and Chrysantza =

13th or 14th century Byzantine romance

Belthandros and Chrysantza (Greek: Τα κατά Βέλθανδρον καὶ Χρυσάντζαν or Διήγησις ἐξαίρετος Βελθάνδρου τοῦ Ῥωμαίου) is a Byzantine romance written by an anonymous author in vernacular Greek. The work describes the love story between a young couple: Belthandros and Chrysantza. The original version of the work was probably composed in 13th or 14th century, while it bears traces of later remodeling that may belong to the 15th century. The world in which the action takes place coincides loosely with the real political geography of 13th-century Anatolia.

== Date and text ==
Belthandros and Chrysantza was probably composed in 13th or early 14th century (1310–1350) by an anonymous author. The text bears some traces of remodeling and linguistic simplifications, and its final form belongs to the 15th century. The romance consist of 1,348 lines in unrhymed political verse, and is written in vernacular language, which is also described as an early form of Modern Greek. The original version of the work is lost, and the text survives in a single manuscript, codex Parisiensis 2909, folios 1–40, dating at the earliest to the 16th century.

== Sources ==
A group of scholars believe that the romance was based on a medieval French work, still unknown or lost, due to similarities with the Provençal poetry or some elements like the names of the protagonists, which are hellenized forms of western European names: Belthandros (Bertrant/Bertram), Rhodophilos (Rudolf). On the other hand, Krumbacher and Diehl disagreed with this view and support that the romance was written by a Greek, but in a land which had been familiar for a long time with the Frankish feudal culture and its conventions, like the 13th-century Byzantine world. Another historian, J. B. Bury, supports that the work is entirely Greek in its construction, descriptions and ideas without any western influences: Medieval French and Greek romance followed parallel evolution, independent of each other, and both were affected by Hellenistic motives. The romance also includes elements typical of the earlier, 12th-century Byzantine romances, such as the use of elaborate ekphraseis of gardens and buildings, or the occurrence of bride shows, which harkens back to earlier Byzantine practice. In this mixture of motifs, the work represents the partial absorption of French cultural elements, following the extensive contact and intermingling of Byzantines and Franks during the period of the Crusades, and especially after the Fourth Crusade.

== Plot summary ==
Belthandros, a Roman (Byzantine) prince and youngest son of king Rhodophilos, quarrels with his father and leaves his home to seek his fortune. After wandering in the lands of Anatolia and dealing with Turkish bandits, he reaches Tarsus in Armenian Cilicia. There he sees a fiery star in the depths of a river (a metaphor for love) and follows it to the north. In this way he finds a castle built of precious gems, which belongs to King Eros (Greek: Ερωτόκαστρον, Erotokastron), and is full of various miracles and magnificent statues and automatons. Belthandros leaves his escorts outside and enters the castle alone. There he sees an inscription that tells of his predestined love between him and Chrysantza, the daughter of the king of Great Antioch. He is then summoned by the lord of the castle, Eros, who announces to him a beauty contest at which Belthandros must give a wand to the most beautiful among forty princesses. The contest takes place and Belthandros gives the wand to the most beautiful princess, whereupon all that surrounds him suddenly disappears "like a dream", leaving him alone in the castle. At this point he resolves to go out and seek the princess.

After a short journey he arrives in Antioch where he meets the king of the city, is accepted as his liegeman, and soon becomes an intimate of the royal household. There he meets his daughter Chrysantza, whom he recognizes as the princess he chose at the Castle of Eros. Although Chrysantza has never seen him before, she too recognizes him, and the two fall in love. Two years and two months however pass before their first love meeting, which takes place secretly at night in the royal garden. The meeting ends suddenly when a jealous courtier discovers them and Belthandros is put in jail. In order to save her lover's life, Chrysantza convinces her faithful chambermaid, Phaidrokaza, to take the blame by declaring that the prince had visited her instead. The king believes the story and a forced marriage between Belthandros and Phaidrokaza takes place.

The following days the couple continues to meet secretly, but soon the situation becomes unsatisfactory, and they decide to flee, together with the chambermaid and two retainers. On the way, they cross a flooded river, where Phaidrokaza and the two retainers are drowned, while the two lovers are separated and thrown up on the far bank. Chrysantza comes upon the corpse of one of the retainers, made unrecognizable from the river. Thinking it is Belthandros, she is about to fall on the dead man's sword, when Belthandros himself appears to forestall her. The lovers reach the seacoast where they find a ship sent by king Rhodophilos in search for his son. The romance ends with their return to Constantinople, where a wedding ceremony is performed and Belthandros is proclaimed heir to his father's kingdom.

== Contents and style ==
The romance offers various scenes of striking realism, with allegory and imaginative lyricism, while some critics consider it superior in imaginative power to the Niebelungenlied. Moreover, it follows a completely symmetrical plot, which is mainly divided between the realm of the fantastic, i.e. the Castle of Eros, and the real world, i.e. Antioch and the love with Chrysantza.

The beauty contest resembles the Judgement of Paris from the Epic Cycle, and also reflects the 7th-8th century Byzantine custom of bride-shows. The castle of king Eros (or castle of love) is probably inspired by the Chateau d' Amour of the Provençal poetry.

In comparison to other contemporary Byzantine romances, such as the tale of Kallimachos and Chrysorrhoe or Libistros and Rhodamne, Belthandros and Chrysantza contains fewer "fairy-tale" elements, but stronger loans from Greek mythology, while Belthandros' travails in Anatolia are largely drawn from the acritic songs. All three however share a heritage from the 12th-century Byzantine romances, whose conventions they follow, as well as a strong and pervading presence of Frankish elements.

== Sources ==
- Beaton, Roderick (1996). The medieval Greek romance. Routledge. ISBN 978-0-415-12032-6.
- Beck, Hans Georg (1971). Geschichte der byzantinischen Volksliteratur. Munich: C.H. Beck. ISBN 978-3-406-01420-8.
- Kazhdan, Alexander, ed. (1991), Oxford Dictionary of Byzantium, Oxford University Press, ISBN 978-0-19-504652-6
- Schmeling, Gareth L. (1996). The novel in the ancient world. BRILL. ISBN 978-90-04-09630-1.
- Vasiliev, A. A. (1958). History of the Byzantine Empire, 324–1453, Vol. 2. Univ of Wisconsin Press. ISBN 978-0-299-80926-3.
- Three Medieval Greek Romances: Velthandros and Chrysandza, Kallimachos and Chrysorroi, Livistros and Rodamni. Translated by Gavin Betts. New York: Garland Library of Medieval Literature, 98 (B). 1995.
