= Song of Armouris =

11th-century Byzantine Greek acritic ballad

- Original title: Ἄσμα τοῦ Ἀρμούρη
- Written: 11th century
- Country: Byzantine Empire
- Language: Medieval Greek
- Series: Acritic songs
- Subject: Arab-Byzantine conflict
- Genre: Heroic ballad

The Song of Armouris or the Lay of Armouris (also Armoures; Greek: Ἄσμα τοῦ Ἀρμούρη) (Note: romanized: Ásma toû Armoúrē) is a medieval Greek heroic poem of the middle Byzantine period. Dating from the 11th century, it is probably one of the oldest surviving Acritic songs, narrative heroic songs or ballads celebrating the lives and exploits of the Byzantine Akritai. Written in vernacular medieval Greek, it is, along with the more famous Digenes Akritas, the earliest example of Byzantine folk poetry and Greek vernacular literature. Its plot is based on the Byzantine-Arab conflict (7th–12th centuries) and describes in political verse the efforts of a young Byzantine akrite warrior to rescue his father from captivity.

== Date and text ==
The Song of Armouris is written in unrhymed fifteen-syllable political verse, and consists of 197 lines. There are two surviving manuscripts of the ballad, one in St. Petersburg dating to the 15th or 16th century, and one in the Topkapi Palace collection in Istanbul dated 1461. Thus far, only the St. Petersburg text has been published in full. The texts of the two manuscripts are remarkably similar to each other, ruling out a provenance from a contemporary oral tradition, but it is clear that the text derives from earlier oral sources. From its linguistic features and content the poem probably dates from the 11th century, making it one of the oldest surviving Byzantine heroic poems and one of the earliest evidences for the modern Greek vernacular.

== Plot summary ==
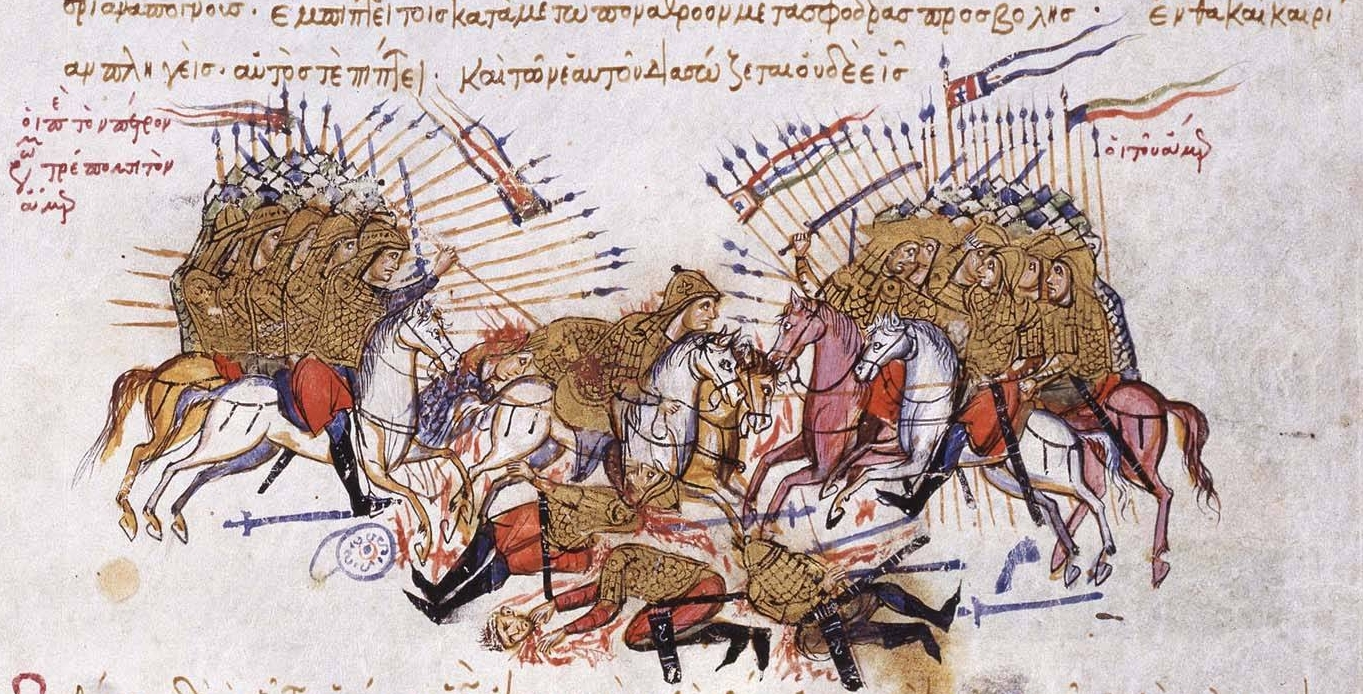
Fight between the Byzantines and the Arabs as depicted in the 12th-century Madrid Skylitzes manuscript.

The plot describes the campaign of a young man, named Arestis or Armouris Armouropoulos ("son of Armouris"). Although under-age, he accomplishes feats of strength, required by his mother for him to ride on his father's stallion. Crossing the Euphrates with the aid of an angel, he fights an army of Saracens single-handed, "for a day and a night". He is victorious, but gets unhorsed and loses his mace in an ambush. He pursues the Saracen who captured the horse into Syria. Upon reaching him, Armouris cuts off his arm and orders him to go to his emir and announce his arrival. When Armouris' father, who is being held captive by the Saracens, sees the horse, he recognizes it and assumes that his son is dead.

The Saracen emir, whose chivalry is exemplary, reassures the father and orders a search to be made for the missing son. The father writes to him to cease slaughtering Saracens, so that he will be treated with mercy, but Armouris refuses unless his father is freed, and threatens to rampage across Syria. The Emir, alarmed, finally agrees to let Armouris' father go and offers him his daughter in marriage in order to secure peace.

== Contents and style ==
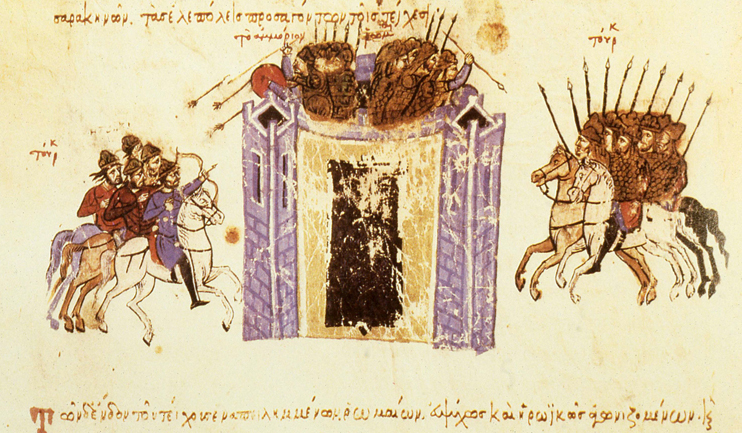
The sack of Amorium is thought to have inspired Byzantine legends and literary works, including the Song of Armouris. Madrid Skylitzes, 12th-century manuscript.

The Byzantine-Arab conflicts that lasted from the mid-7th to the early 11th century provide the context for Byzantine heroic ("acritic", from the akritai border guards) poetry, written in the vernacular Greek language. Along with the better-known epic romance Digenis Akritas, the Song of Armouris ranks among the most important and oldest of these works. Various hypotheses have been made on the origin of the main character's name and the events that inspired the original poem. The Byzantinist Henri Grégoire, who dated the work to the 9th century, proposed that the poem reflects the aftermath of the Arab sack of Amorion in 838, and that Armouris is Michael III (r. 842–867), during whose reign the Arab raids into Anatolia were decisively beaten back (at the Battle of Lalakaon in 863). According to Grégoire's interpretation, the one-armed Saracen of the song is Umar al-Aqta ("Umar the one-handed"), the emir of Melitene who was defeated and killed at Lalakaon. G. Veloudis on the other hand equated Armouris with Umar himself, believing that tales of him survived in Byzantine folk legend, and that in subsequent times, when the exact circumstances were no longer known, the emir, whose title was rendered as amiras in Greek, became Armouris.

Although Armouris' plot is complex, the narrative is fast-moving and lively. And while the style is plain it has considerable descriptive power. The poem contains much of the formulaic texture of oral poetry. According to its style, the original composition of the Song of Armouris may well date to an earlier period than Digenis Akritas, since features of oral epic composition and a certain archaic poetical economy found there are more marked.

== See also ==
- Digenes Akritas
- Acritic songs

== Sources ==
- Beaton, Roderick (1996). The medieval Greek romance. Routledge. ISBN 978-0-415-12032-6.
- Beaton, Roderick (2004). Folk Poetry of Modern Greece. Cambridge University Press. ISBN 978-0-521-60420-8.
- Beck, Hans Georg (1971). Geschichte der byzantinischen Volksliteratur. Munich: C.H. Beck. ISBN 978-3-406-01420-8.
- Horrocks, Geoffrey C. (1996). Greek: a history of the language and its speakers. Longman. ISBN 978-0-582-30709-4.
- Kazhdan, Alexander, ed. (1991). The Oxford Dictionary of Byzantium. Oxford and New York: Oxford University Press. ISBN 0-19-504652-8.
- Markopoulos, Theodore (2008). The Future in Greek: From Ancient to Medieval. Oxford University Press US. ISBN 978-0-19-953985-7.
- Petsopoulos, Stavros (2001). Greece: Books and Writers (PDF). National Book Center of Greece - Ministry of Culture. ISBN 960-7894-29-4.
