= Akritai =

Byzantine border guards

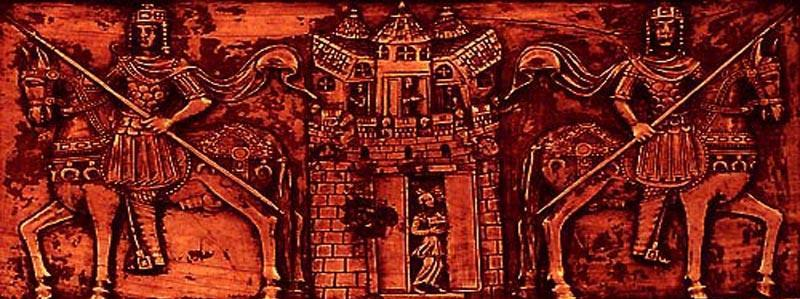
Medieval plate depicting Akritai, the frontiersmen or border guards of the Byzantine Empire, about which epic songs were written.

The akritai (Greek: ἀκρίται, sg. akrites, ἀκρίτης) is a term used in the Byzantine Empire in the 9th–11th centuries to denote the frontier soldiers guarding the Empire's eastern border, facing the Muslim states of the Middle East. Their exploits, embellished, inspired the Byzantine "national epic" of Digenes Akritas and the cycle of the Acritic songs.

== History ==
The eastern frontier of Anatolia, home to Byzantine Akritai, depicted during Arab-Byzantine wars.

The term is derived from the Greek word akron (ἄκρον, in plural akra), meaning 'border' or 'edge'; similar border guards, the limitanei, were employed in the late Roman and early Byzantine armies to guard the frontiers (limes). In official Byzantine use, the term is non-technical, and used in a descriptive manner, being generally applied to the defenders as well as the inhabitants of the eastern frontier zone, including their Muslim counterparts. The popular image of the Akritoi has been heavily influenced by their portrayal in the Acritic songs, and refers to the military troops stationed along the Empire's border. In reality, the Byzantine troops stationed along the edges of the Empire were a mixture of professional troops and local thematic militia, as well as irregular units that constituted the Akritai or Apelatai proper.

These were light infantry recruited from the native Byzantine population and Armenians. By the late 10th century, the reconquest of much territory in the East meant that the former were often ethnically and religiously mixed, a fact epitomized by the legendary Digenes Akritas: "digenes" means "of two races", i.e. "Roman" (Byzantine/Greek) and "Saracen". The Apelatai, whose role and tactics are described in Nikephoros II Phokas' De velitatione bellica, acted as raiders, scouts and border guards in the perennial border warfare between Byzantium and its eastern neighbors, characterized by skirmishes and raids. Aside from light infantry, the border forces were complemented by the light cavalry called trapezitai or tasinarioi. In case of a major Arab raid (razzia), they were supposed to raise the alarm, assist in the evacuation of the local population to the various strongholds, and shadow and harass the enemy force until reinforcements could arrive.

Many of the Akritai were members of the separated Armenian church and most of them gave protection to heretics. Often, they were active as brigands as well – they were known as chonsarioi, from the Bulgarian for "thieves", in the Balkans, and in the epic of Digenes, the apelatai are brigands. Whether these men were also given military estates like the other thematic soldiers to cultivate or lived on rents from smallholdings while concentrating on their military duties is still a matter of debate. Their officers however were drawn from the local aristocracy.

The Akritai declined in importance by the late 10th century, as the Byzantine conquests pushed the border eastwards, and its defense radically restructured, with smaller themata grouped in five large regional commands headed by a doux and a heavy presence of professional troops (tagmata). During the first half of the 11th century, the Byzantines faced little danger in the East, and allowed their military strength to weaken. As a result, they were unable to halt the quick advance of the Seljuk Turks in Asia Minor.

The institution, in the form of a force raised by local inhabitants in exchange for land and tax exemptions, was re-established under Manuel I Komnenos (r. 1143–1180), when he reorganized the themes in the reconquered western portion of Asia Minor. It is also attested during the Empire of Nicaea, guarding the Anatolian frontier, especially around the Meander valley, against the incursions of Turkish nomads. Their attachment to the Laskarid dynasty however led them to revolt against the usurper emperor Michael VIII Palaiologos in 1262. After the revolt was suppressed, the akritai were then enrolled into the regular army, and their exemptions were annulled. As a result, within a generation, they had effectively ceased to exist, opening the way to the complete loss of the Byzantine possessions in Asia Minor during the first half of the 14th century.

Today, Greeks continue to call the inhabitants of Greece who live near the borders as "Akrites", as a remnant of the past.

== See also ==
- Acritic songs
- Digenes Akritas
- Song of Armouris
- Romanos IV Diogenes
- Mardaites
