= Chanson d'aventure =

Genre of medieval poetry

The chanson d'aventure ([ʃɑ̃sɔ̃ davɑ̃tyʁ], English: song of adventure) is a genre of medieval poetry originating in France, but which had a substantial influence on poetry in Middle English.

== Structure ==
The chanson d'aventure (plural chansons d'aventure) is essentially a framing device, where the singer (or poet) wanders into a wild or rural setting and has a chance encounter, usually in the form of a dialogue; it originates in Old French lyrics usually with an erotic or amorous theme. Sometimes, the chanson may focus on an overheard dialogue, or lover's complaint. In either way, the chief feature is that of a chance encounter. It likely evolved from two earlier chanson subtypes, the chanson dramatique and the chanson pastourelle.

Poets in Middle English adopted the trope for themes other than love, often making the debate's focus a moral or devotional one. The genre shares many common features with the dream vision, although with the important distinction that the poet does not fall asleep.

== See also ==
- Chanson de geste
- Medieval debate poetry
