= Anika the Warrior =

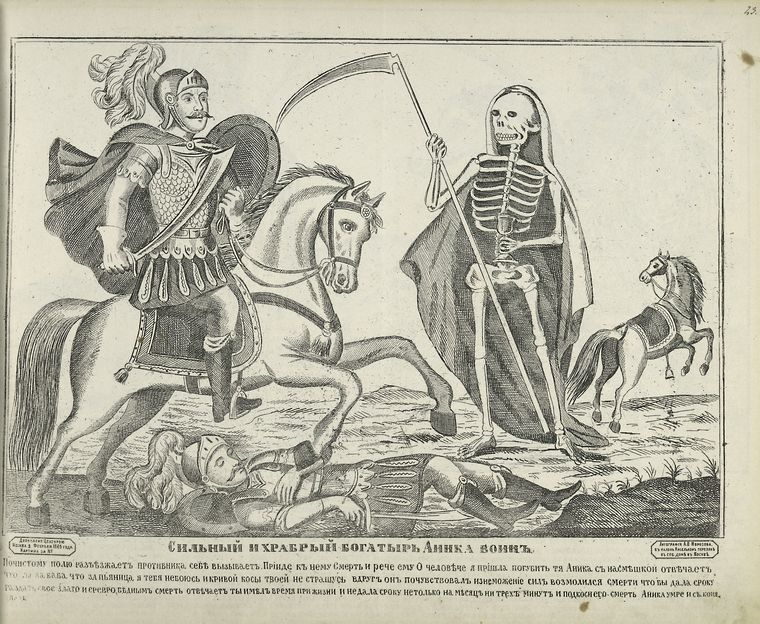
Anika the Warrior versus The Death, lubok from 1865.

Anika the Warrior (Russian: Аника-воин; from Greek: ἀνίκητος, lit. 'unbeatable, unbeaten') is a hero appearing in Russian fairy tales.

According to a "universally known religious ballad", he was a violent and sacrilegious man who set out to destroy the Holy Sepulchre in Jerusalem, but was stopped by the half-beast Wonder. Anika challenges Wonder to a duel, but is immediately overcome because Wonder is Death in disguise. Though he begs for more time and attempts to bribe Death, no mercy is given. Proverbially, an "Anika the Warrior" is one engaged in something as hopeless as a fight against death. He appears in the folk plays Tsar Maximilian and King Herod, and is mentioned in Maxim Gorky's Childhood. Its plot is loosely based on the Byzantine epic about Digenes Akritas.

== Sources ==
- "Images of Anika the Warrior". NYPL Digital Gallery.
- Богатыри и витязи Русской земли: По былинам, сказаниям и песням. (1990) Moscow: "Moskovsky Rabochy" publishers (in Russian)
