= Podea =

Apron hung at the bottom of a religious icon

Podea (Greek: ποδέα) (plural: podeai) is a kind of apron, that clearly designates a cloth hung at the foot of an icon in Orthodox Church, which often accompanies it in religious processions. This hanging often is embroidered with religious scenes or figures of the saints and liturgical writing. The image on a podea might either double or complement the subject of the icon: an epigram by Nicholas Kallikles describes a podea for the icon of the Theotokos at the Hodegon Monastery as “an image of the image”. It is also known as poderes skenos, kraspedon, pterygiori and emprostalion.

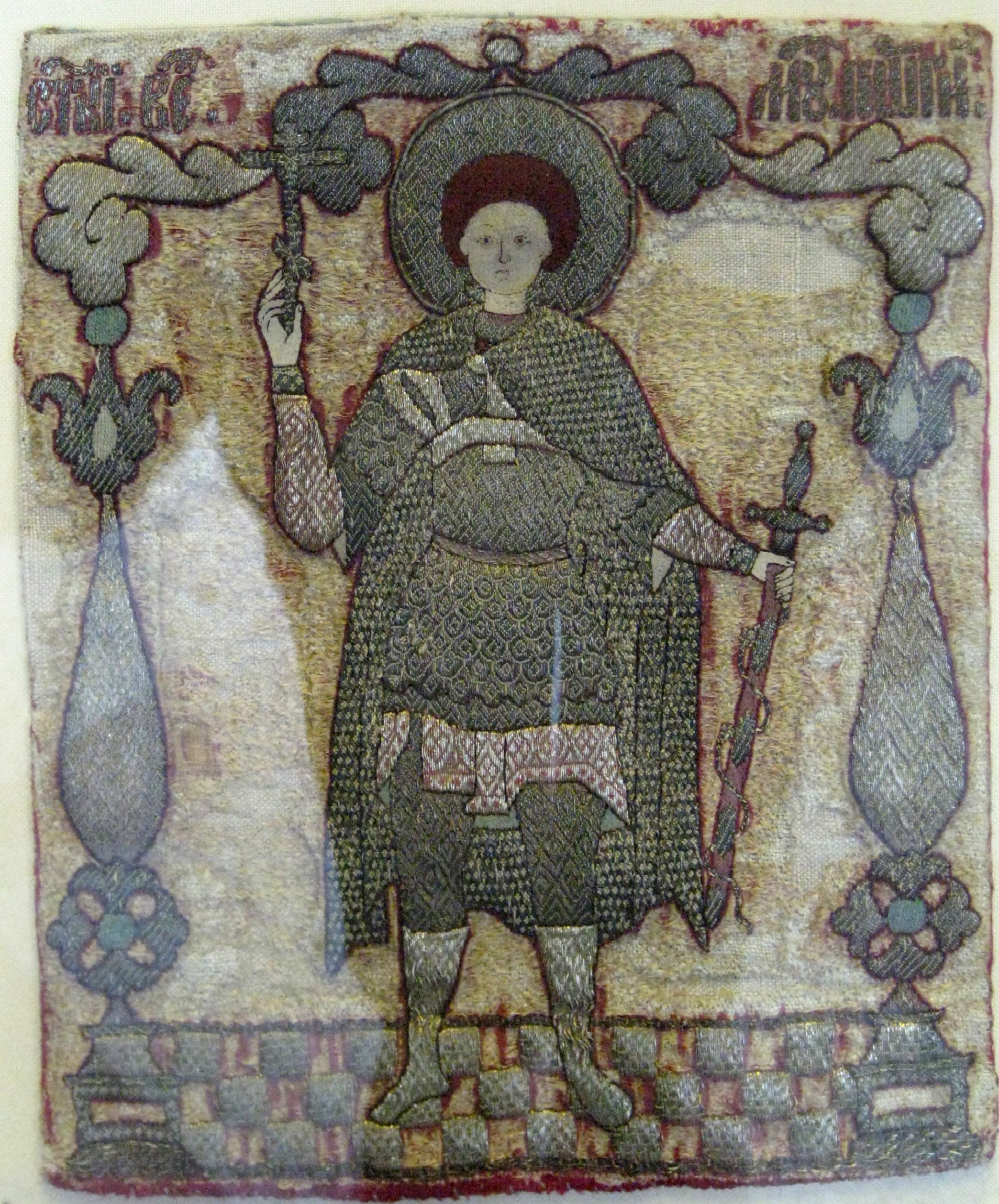
Embroidered podea depicting St. George, first half of the 17th cent. Russian State Historical Museum.

Embroidered podeai evolved into an essential supplement to the iconic image. It serves to create a sophisticated interaction with the icon, creating another level of perception of the icon; as such, it can serve to enrich, and/or develop on, the theme of the icon itself.

== See also ==
- Aër
