= The Dead Brother's Song =

Greek poem

"The Dead Brother's Song" (Greek: Το Τραγούδι Του Νεκρού Αδελφού, or most commonly Του Νεκρού Αδελφού) is a Greek poem, considered to be the oldest surviving dimotikó, which are traditional Greek folk songs.

== History ==
The song was composed in Asia Minor in the 9th century, during the time of the Byzantine Empire.

The Dead Brother's Song was widespread in the Greek-speaking world during the High and Late Middle Ages, as it can be seen by the many variants that have survived in various places of Greece, of which seventeen were published in 1885. The song was adopted by the other Balkan literatures, notably by the Bulgarian and Serbian.

In 1962, Mikis Theodorakis composed a dramatic synthesis based on The Dead Brother's Song named The Ballad of the Dead Brother which referred to the Greek Civil War and the then oppressive political situation in Greece.

== Structure ==
It is written in the meter called Political verse, iambic decapentasyllable (15 syllables), an evolution of the ancient Greek iambic trimeter (iambic dodecasyllable). It is not known whether it was actually set to music or it was merely a poem meant to be recited, as it only survives as a text.

== Content ==
The main figures of the poem are Kostantinos and his sister Arete (which means "Virtue"), a name derived from the ancient Greek goddess Arete. Kostantinos takes over the role of Charon.

At the beginning of the poem, a mother with nine sons and one daughter receives ambassadors from distant, wealthy foreign lands to ask for the daughter Arete to marry a lord. Kostantinos convinces their mother to allow the marriage, so he can one day travel to these foreign lands not as a stranger, and swears an oath to bring back Arete to their mother whenever she wants to see her. The mother accepts and Arete leaves. But all the sons die, including Kostantinos. Arete's mother curses him for failing to bring her daughter back. In order to fullful his oath, he rises from the grave, and makes a supernatural horse either out of his grave or out of the clouds and stars to ride to the distant lands where Arete has been married to. Arete, not knowing that her brother is dead, accepts to ride with him on his horse. But during the journey she keeps noticing increasingly uncanny signs, which he always dismisses or excuses. Upon arrival, he returns to his grave. Mother and daughter embrace, and both die.

The poem is called a παραλογή (paralogē, "illogic") as its theme is supernatural, featuring a dead person resurrecting for some time to fulfil an oath, and birds speaking with human voice.
