= Byzantine romance =

Literary genre

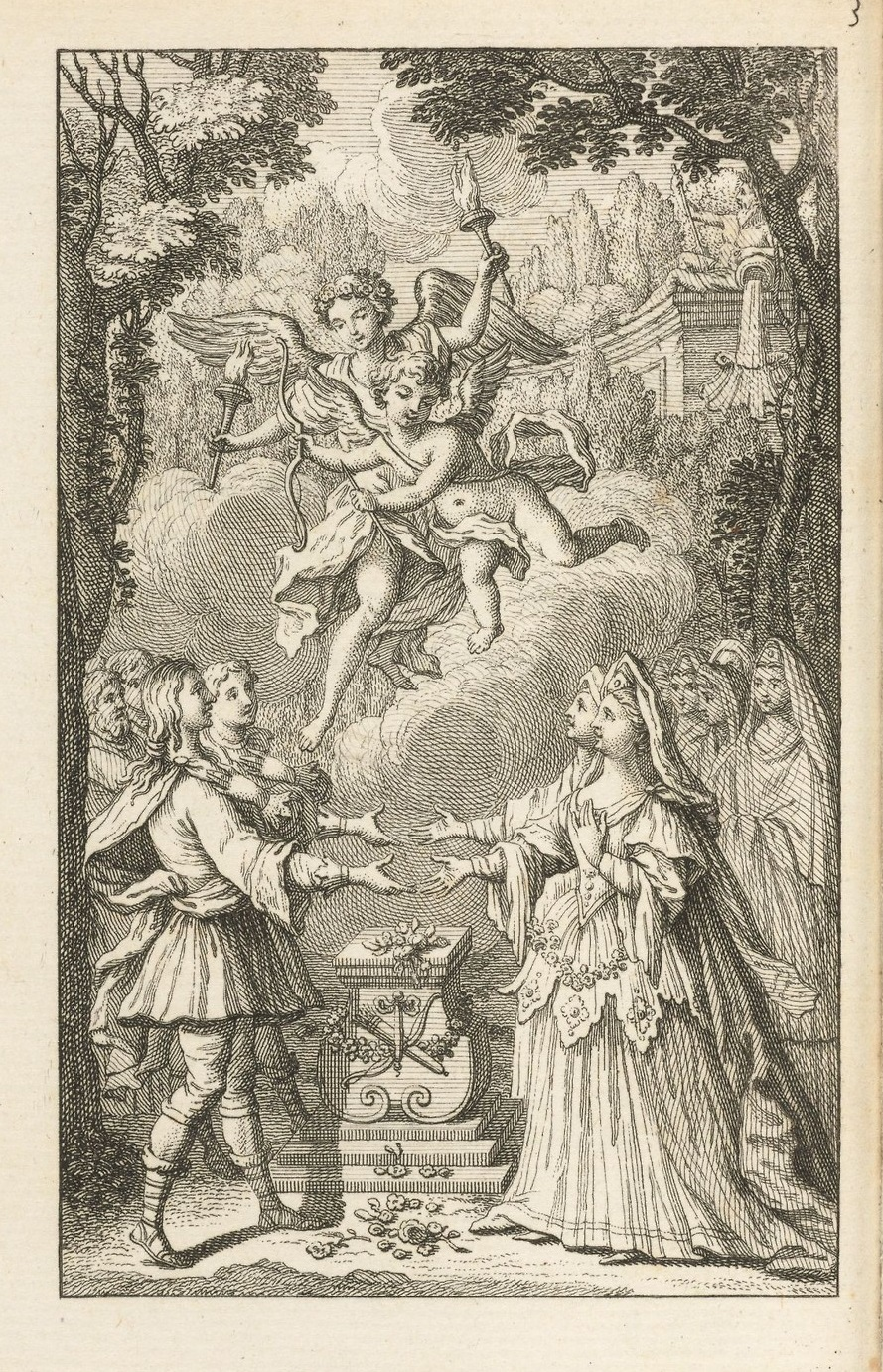
Cover of Les amours d’Ismene et d’Ismenias, a 1743 translation into French of Hysimine and Hysimines by Eustathios Makrembolites (12th century)

Byzantine romance represents a revival of the ancient Greek romance of Roman times. Works in this category were written by Byzantine Greeks of the Eastern Roman Empire during the 12th century.

Under the Comnenian dynasty, Byzantine writers of twelfth century Constantinople reintroduced the ancient Greek romance literature, imitating its form and time but somewhat Christianizing its content. Hence the Byzantine stories are traditional in their plot structure and setting (featuring complex turns of events taking place in the ancient Mediterranean, complete with the ancient gods and beliefs) but are also medieval, clearly belonging to the era of the Crusades as they reflect customs and beliefs of that time. A break of eight centuries exists between the last surviving romance work of late antiquity and the first of this medieval revival.

Only four of these works exist today, just one of which is written in prose: Hysimine and Hysimines by Eustathios Makrembolites. Two are in the dodecasyllable metre: Rodanthe and Dosikles by Theodore Prodromos and Drosilla and Charikles by Niketas Eugenianos. And one is in "political verse," Arístandros and Kallithéa by Constantine Manasses, but exists only in fragments. Within these Romance novels, the erotic kiss was a delicate ritual phenomenon for characters. Besides the relationship with the Orthodox religion, the erotic kiss was also an important catalyst in the characters' loving affairs.

Of these four romances, one had been translated into English before the twenty-first century: Ismene and Ismenias, a Novel by L.H. Le Moine, (London and Paris: 1788). Le Moine, however, had made his translation from the 1756 French translation, Les amours d'Ismene et d'Ismenias, of Pierre-François Godart de Beauchamps, which had in turn been made from a Latin rather than a Greek text.

More recently, however, interest in these works by English readers has increased, resulting in new translations directly from the Greek.

- A Byzantine Novel: Drosilla and Charikles by Niketas Eugenianos translated by Joan Burton (Bolchazy-Carducci Publishers, Inc., 2004).
- Four Byzantine Novels translated by Elizabeth Jeffreys (Liverpool University Press, 2012), which includes Rhodanthe and Dosikles by Theodore Prodromos, Hysmine and Hysminias by Eumathios Makrembolites, Aristandros and Kallithea by Constantine Manasses, and Drosilla and Charikles by Niketas Eugenianos

Later medieval romance works from around the fourteenth century continued this literary tradition. These are the anonymous

- Belthandros and Chrysantza
- Kallimachos and Chrysorrhoe
- Lybistros and Rhodamne

available in English translation as Three Medieval Greek Romances: Velthandros and Chrysandza, Kallimachos and Chrysorroi, Livistros and Rodamni, translated by Gavin Betts, Garland Library of Medieval Literature, 98 (B), (New York & London: Garland Publishing, Inc. 1995). One of them is available in French: M Pichard, Le roman de Callimaque et de Chrysorrhoé: Texte établi et traduit, (Paris: 1956). Some of them are available in Italian : C Cupane Romanzi Cavallereschi Bizantini (Torino:1995) Other medieval romance works include the anonymous:

- The Tale of Achilles
- The Tale of Troy: a Byzantine Iliad

== See also ==
- Byzantine literature
