= Political verse =

Common metric form in Greek poetry

Political verse (Greek: politikós stíkhos, πολιτικός στίχος), also known as decapentasyllabic verse (from Greek: dekapentasýllabos, δεκαπεντασύλλαβος, lit. '15-syllable'), is a common metric form in Medieval and Modern Greek poetry. It is an iambic verse of fifteen syllables and has been the main meter of traditional popular and folk poetry since the Byzantine period.

The name is unrelated to the modern English concept of politics and does not imply political content; rather, it derives from the original meaning of the Greek word πολιτικός, civil or civic, meaning that it was originally a form used for secular poetry, the non-religious entertainment of the people of the polis, the city-state.

It is also called "ἡμαξευμένοι στίχοι" (hemakseuménoi stíhoi "like-a-chariot-on-a-paved-road") verse, because the words run freely like a chariot on a good driving surface.

== History ==
The political verse flourished from the 9th or 10th century, until the 19th and 20th centuries. It remains in use today, though, mainly by the type of "traditional" folk songs. The term "political" has nothing to do with "politics". Πολιτικός also means "civil" or "civic", and at the time it had the meaning "of everyday people". The term appears as early as in the 11th century, and had probably been in use earlier. The first use of political verse in writing is attributed to John Tzetzes. His Book of Histories (Khiliades), in 12,000 verses, is written in political verse has the title: "Ιωάννου του Τζέτζου βιβλίον ιστορικόν το δια στίχων πολιτικών, άλφα καλούμενον..." (By John Tzetzes, book of histories in political verses, called alpha..."). A short "admonitory" poem of his contemporary, Michael Psellos, to the emperor Constantine IX Monomachos is titled: ΣΤΙΧΟΙ ΠΟΛΙΤΙΚΟΙ ΠΡΟΣ ΤΟ ΒΑΣΙΛΕΑ ΚΥΡΟΝ ΚΩΝΣΤΑΝΤΙΝΟΝ ΤΟΝ ΜΟΝΟΜΑΧΟΝ ΠΕΡΙ ΤΗΣ ΓΡΑΜΜΑΤΙΚΗΣ (Political verses to the Emperor Kyr (Sire) Constantine Monomachos on Grammar). Earlier examples can be found in the older Greek poetry that used metres based on prosody, as in the poetry of Gregory of Nazianzus (4th century) and even earlier. Examples can be found even in some Homeric verses, but it isn't clear if that occurrence was intentional or incidental.

== Form ==
Each verse is a 15-syllable iambic verse, normally (and in accordance with the ancient Greek poetical tradition) the Political verse is without rhyme. So it is a type of blank verse of iambic heptameter. The meter consists of lines made from seven ("hepta") feet plus an unstressed syllable. There is a standard cesura (pause in the reading of a line of a verse that does not affect the metrical account of the timing) after the eighth syllable. Rhyme occurs only rarely, especially in the earlier folk songs and poems. Later examples, especially in personal poetry and in songwriting there is rhyme. In those cases the rhyme scheme is more commonly that of the couplet: aa, or, aa/bb/cc/dd etc.; sometimes the rhyme may appear at the end of the cesura and that of the stanza, or in two successive cesurae. Generally speaking though, rhyme is used quite sparingly, either to make a dramatic point or for comic effect.

Each fifteen-syllable verse can be regarded or examined as a "distich" of two verses, one eight-syllable and one seven-syllable. Its form looks as follows:

U — | U — | U — | U — || U — |U — | U — | U

Until the 14th century, the half-foot could begin with two anapests instead of three iambs (Kambylis, A. 1995. Textkritik und Metrik: Überlegungen zu ihrem Verhältnis zueinander. Byzantinische Zeitschrift 88: 38–67):

U U — | U U — | U — || U — |U — | U — | U

U — | U — | U — | U — || U U — | U U — | U

To this day, each half-foot can also begin with a trochee; this is called choriambic, by comparison to its ancient metrical counterpart.

— U | U — | U — | U — || U — |U — | U — | U

— U | U — | U — | U — || — U |U — | U — | U

== Example ==
A typical example of the use of Political verse in Greek folk poetry is the beginning of the medieval ballad The Bridge of Arta (Το γεφύρι της Άρτας):

Original, phonetic transcription

Saránta pénte mástori — ki' eksínda mathitádes
Yofírin ethemélionan — stis Ártas to potámi.
Olimerís to khtízane, — to vrádi gremizótan.

Poetic translation

The master builders forty-five, — apprentice builders sixty,
Were laying the foundatïons — to bridge the Arta River,
And they would build it all day long: — it fell down in the evening.

This excerpt is also typical in terms of content arrangement: the parts before the cesura make an initial statement and the parts after the cesura append, clarify, or retort that statement.

== Technique and structure ==
The "mechanics" of Political verse is rather straightforward: the verse has a more or less strict form and deviations from it are usually incidental, or the exception than the rule. The structure of each verse follows closely that convention: in the first part of each verse (the first eight syllables) the main theme of the verse is introduced, in the "main clause" of the verse. That It could be a statement, part of a dialogue, or a depiction of some action. Then on the next, seven-syllable, part after the cesura, the main clause is reinforced, or additional information is provided. Either by been explained, or completed, or supplemented, or quite often the theme of the main clause is amplified by been repeated or restated in other words. Political verses are usually, but not exclusively, organized in pairs (thus forming "stanzas" of two lines, known as distichs or couplets). The poem can be as short as a single two-line stanza, or as long as the poet wishes. Some of the early narrative poems consist of thousands of lines. In the case of such "distichs" the second verse shows the same structure with the first, except that it is not introducing the theme of the main clause, but it completes it. As it is apparent each one verse and each main clause of the verses are meaningful by themselves, with the second parts of the verses often being of an explanatory nature.

== Grammar and language ==
The language used with Political verse is of a utilitarian, frugal, type: Nouns, verbs, linking words and pronouns. Adjectives and adverbs are largely absent. That makes the verses much "down-to-earth", and less "pompous". As it is apparent from the description of the "technique" behind the political verse, each verse consists of a main clause and something like a non-defining (non-restrictive) relative clause.

== Ethos: mood and feeling ==
The "ethos of music" was the term given to describe the effect on character or mood. Political verses when recited for long can be rather monotonous to a modern audience. That is because their form is strict and does not vary greatly from verse to verse. Always the same meter of fifteen-syllable iambic verses, with the cesura after the eighth syllable, on and on. Maybe that is why the Political verses do not regularly identify with rhyme. Regular rhyme can only make their recitation duller and more monotonous. It is true that sometimes the cesura is not after the eighth syllable, or there is no cesura at all. That can give some variation to the general rhythm of the poem. Such cases are the exception rather than the rule, and do not seem to be there to provide variation. They seem incidental, or unavoidable, especially in the case of the old narrative "epic" poems. Yet, the main use of Political verse is not for poems to be recited, but for songs to be sung, and in most cases danced as well. The "monotony" of the recitation, then, disappears in the music and dance, and in that help the movements of the bodies and the musical prosody (in singing some syllables become long, others are short). Also, in the case of narrative poems which are the most likely to be recited, the main focus is on their content, the events they narrate. And thus the monotony of the rhythm of the meter is taken aside, by the interest to the story. Moreover, the monotonous meter can assist memorization. Originally the political verse was a part of an oral poetical tradition, of a largely illiterate medieval society, that found in them an almost natural way to express itself, in such "down-to-earth", and less "pompous" verses.

== Use ==
It seems that the Political verse was used in folk and personal (lyric) poetry alike. For every kind of poems. Love poems, laments, epigrams, admonitory (didactic) and narrative poems. Nowadays the most familiar to us use of Political verses is in medieval long narrative "heroic" or "epic" poems, the Acritic songs epics were, and in traditional folk songs. Political verses are found in Cretan poems of Sahlikis, in the Byzantine romance novels after the 12th century, and also in the, usually "spooky", "paralogaí" (a type of narrative Greek folk tales in a song form, comparable with the European Folk Ballad, with a paranormal or macabre content, made of few tens or few hundred lines) like "The Dead Brother's Song" and throughout in most traditional Greek folk songs, to the present day Greek popular songs.

== Analogies in English poetry ==
In English poetry the type of meter that resembles, somehow, this Greek Political verse is the one called "iambic heptameter" or a "fourteener". Such verses can be found in the English poetry, mainly of the 16th century but in other cases as well. An early example is the first translation into English of Ovid's "Metamorphoses" (1567) - credited to Arthur Golding. For example, (from Book 2, THE SECONDE BOOKE OF OVIDS METAMORPHOSIS):

The Princely Pallace of the Sunne stood gorgeous to beholde
On stately Pillars builded high of yellow burnisht golde,
Beset with sparckling Carbuncles that like to fire did shine.

Another, later, example is from Lord Byron's Youth and Age:

'Tis but as ivy-leaves around the ruin'd turret wreathe,
All green and wildly fresh without, but worn and gray beneath.

But in the English poetry the lines have mostly masculine rhyme whereas in Greek poetry the fifteen syllable feminine line is the norm of the Political verse.

== Importance ==
The Political verse characterizes traditional Greek poetry, especially between 1100 and 1850. It is the verse in which most Greek folk songs are written, including such temporally distant works as the medieval Cretan romance "Erotokritos" and the 3rd draft of Dionysios Solomos' "The Free Besieged", considered the masterpiece of modern Greek poetry. It is thought that the political verse replaced, in popularity and also in use, the famous dactylic hexameter of the ancient Greeks (also known as "heroic hexameter") in later Greek poetry, from the time of the early modern Greek, following the loss of ancient prosody and pitch accent, being ideally suited to its replacement, stress accent. This metric form comes "natural" in modern Greek (that is the common Greek, spoken after the 9th or 10th century to the present day), and it is extremely easy to form a "poem" or a "distich" in political verse, almost without a thought. In fact it is such a natural meter for the language that one could actually form continually ones' everyday speech in political verse, if one wished to do so.

== See also ==
- Mantinada

== Sources ==
- Babette Deutsch, Poetry Handbook. A dictionary of terms. Fletcher & Son Ltd. Norwich. 1957-1962. SBN 224 61021 X.

== Bibliography ==
- Jeffreys, Michael J. "The Nature and Origins of the Political Verse." Dumbarton Oaks Papers 28 (1974), pp. 141–195.
