= Acritic songs =

Songs about Byzantine akritai

The Acritic songs (Greek: Ακριτικά τραγούδια, lit. 'frontiersmen songs') are the epic poems that emerged in the Byzantine Empire probably around the ninth century. The songs celebrated the exploits of the Akritai, the frontier guards defending the eastern borders of the Byzantine Empire. The historical background was the almost continuous Arab–Byzantine wars between the seventh and twelfth centuries. Against this background several romances were produced, the most famous of which is that of Digenes Akritas, considered by some to signal the beginnings of modern Greek literature.

== Subject ==
Written in Medieval Greek, the Acritic songs deal with the heroic deeds (Greek: ανδραγαθίες) of ἀκρίτες ("frontiersmen"), warriors that lived near the Arab frontiers and fought against the enemy. The constant state of war in the region and the repeated confrontations with the Arabs inspired poets to write down tales of chivalry as a response to a society that wished to be informed or hear details, whether factual or imaginary, of the adventures caused by enemy invasions or of the martial valor of their countrymen who drove the enemy out. The fate of the local civilians — who after each invasion often had to face the loss of family members as well as their own pain — is also a major theme.

The invasion and riposte, the hatred for the invader, the desire for revenge, the fate of female prisoners and the endeavours undertaken to achieve their rescue, all inspire the poet who, based on direct narrations by eyewitnesses, organises and develops this pool of information and emotions into a live language with an easily memorable verse. The poet also narrates in recitation, or in a simple, recurring, and easily taught pace, the enslavement, duels, massacres, escapes, release of captives, and often the bonds of affection between kidnappers and women that led to marriage and reconciliation.

== Origins ==
Most academics trace the origins of Byzantine Akritic chivalric romance to the oral epic poetry of the ninth and tenth centuries. Greek scholar Sokrátes Kuyás (Greek: Σωκράτης Κουγέας) dates the earliest reference to oral epics of the tenth century to a speech given by bishop Arethas of Caesarea condemning the local αγύρται (ayirte, the Greek counterpart of troubadours) of Paphlagonia for glorifying violent acts instead of the saints and God. Kougeas aptly observed that Arethas suggests a tradition developed at that time exactly in central Anatolia, which was the cradle of Acritic literature. The preservation of such important oral songs in Asia Minor up to 1922, when the entire region was depopulated of Greeks, proves that Kougeas's assumption is valid.

These folk singers may have been professionals, or semi-professionals that temporarily abandoned their jobs to sing their songs for pay. This tradition remains today in Cyprus with the ποιηταράδες ("chanters") that sing regularly in festivals and holidays.

A famous theory from specialist Roderick Beaton is that the poem of Digenes Akritas was first written in the capital, Constantinople, during the twelfth century, using elements from the military landed aristocracy, originally from the empire's Asian provinces. These had fled to the capital after the establishment of the Sultanate of Rum in the mid-eleventh century.

They made the songs to keep their culture alive, giving attention to skills in war, personal honour and courage, and an aristocratic way of life.

== Background ==
With the early Muslim conquests came a life of warfare for the residents of the easternmost territories. Syria was occupied in 640 and from then on, every year, Saracens attempted invasions in Asia Minor, carrying off captives on their way back. Cities were usually retaken by the Byzantine army, with the exception of Tarsus and Adana, which remained under occupation until the tenth century; but each year, after the invaders left, the pain and suffering of the inhabitants remained, along with their despair for their beloved ones that were missing. This continuous state of warfare set the stage for Acritic poetry.

The hero of these poems, the Ακρίτης (Akritis), is the personification of all Byzantine soldiers that guarded those territories. As early as emperor Alexander Severus, soldiers were vested with land that would pass on to their sons in exchange for their service in the army. Justinian I consolidated these lands as tax-free, the owners of which Procopius names as λιμιτανέοι (limitanei). With the creation of the Byzantine theme system the landowners were given further privileges, that also excluded lakes from taxes. During the reign of Constantine VII, Akritic lands were not allowed to be sold, even with the consent of the owner. This was necessary for the preservation of cavalry which was important for dealing with thieves (απελάτες). Following Byzantine successes against the Arabs after the tenth century, the borderlands were stabilised, tensions between them settled down, and attention was diverted away from foreign affairs towards internal dangers.

== Poems ==
Most poems did not survive the Ottoman occupation of Greece, and only a fraction remains of the original number of works, yet the ones we do hold today were famous enough to have existed in enough copies to survive. The most well known oral songs were written down and copied in great numbers, the most exceptional case being the Digenes Akritas which was well known even in Western Europe, outside the Byzantine Empire.

The most important Acritic romances are:

- Digenes Akritas (Διγενής Ακρίτας)
- Andronicus' Steed (Ο Ανδρόνικος και ο Μαύρος του)
- Son of Andronicus (Ο υιός του Ανδρόνικου)
- Song of Armouris (Το άσμα του Αρμούρη)

== Legacy ==
Acritis, as a representation of Acritic poetry, is greatly influential in modern Greek literature. Besides its prose of popular idiom which went on to influence and shape modern Greek, the poems themselves were nationalistic enough in character that they became a symbol of Greek continuity. Byzantine nationalism during the formation of the Greek state and in the age of the new "Megali Idea" was widened and intensified. Kostis Palamas, among the greatest of Greek poets, was preparing his own version of Digenis Acrites before his death. Byzantine history as part of Greece's wider history derives from historian Constantine Paparrigopoulos and it is that which inspired Palamas in one of his poems ("Iambs and Anapaests") to praise the hero of Digenis Acrites as the connecting link between the Greece of the Greco-Persian Wars and the 1821 Greek Revolution:

Ο Ακρίτας είμαι, Χάροντα,
δέν περνώ μέ τά χρόνια,
Είμ' εγώ η ακατάλυτη ψυχή τών Σαλαμίνων,
στήν Εφτάλοφην έφερα το σπαθί τών Ελλήνων.

Translation:

It is I, Acritas, O Death;
years can't fade me away.
I'm the indestructible soul of Salamis,
bringing the sword of the Greeks to the Sevenhill.

With the defeat of Greece in the Greco-Turkish War (1919–1922) signaling the death of the "Megali Idea", and along with population exchange that emptied Anatolia of Greeks, the legend of Akritas was weakened, although not completely erased. After World War II, Nikos Kazantzakis planned on writing his own poem centered on Acritas, who this time would not be the personification of a nation but of the higher and continuous spiritual fight of man. Its historical context would not be Byzantine.

== Sources ==
- Alexiou Margaret (2002). After antiquity: Greek language, myth, and metaphork. Cornell University Press. ISBN 978-0-8014-3301-6.
- Dēmaras Kōnstantinos (1972). A history of modern Greek literature. SUNY Press. ISBN 978-0-87395-071-8.
- Sultan Nancy (1999). Exile and the poetics of loss in Greek tradition. Rowman & Littlefield. ISBN 978-0-8476-8752-7.
