= Byzantine literature =

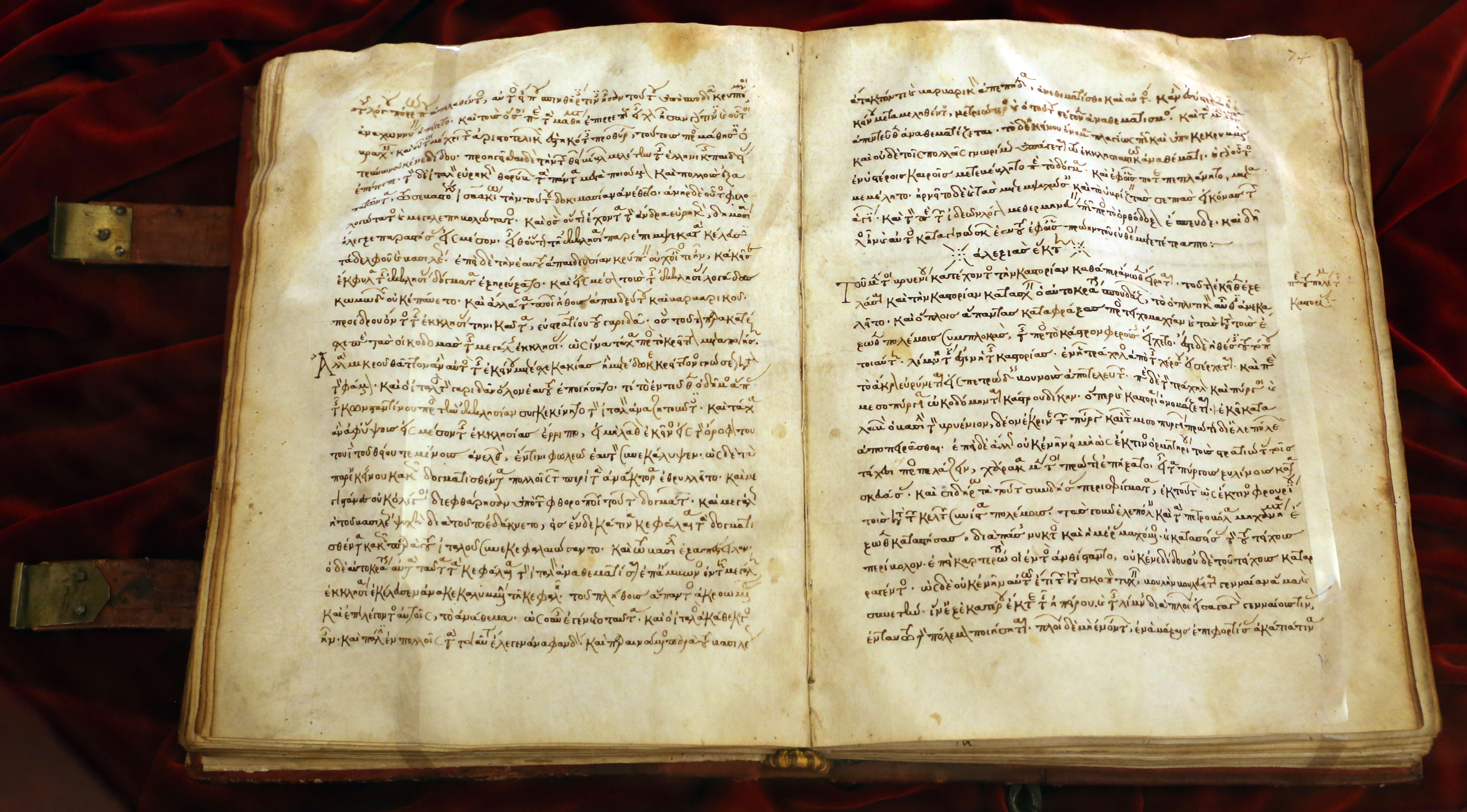
The Alexiad, a history by Anna Komnene, in a 12th-century manuscript. Kept in the Biblioteca Medicea Laurenziana, Florence

Byzantine literature is the Greek literature of the Middle Ages, whether written in the Byzantine Empire or outside its borders. In its early period, it was a form of late antique literature, and later, it evolved into a category of medieval literature. It was marked by a linguistic diglossy; two distinct forms of Byzantine Greek were used, a scholarly dialect based on Attic Greek, and a vernacular based on Koine Greek. Most scholars consider 'literature' to include all medieval Greek texts, but some define it with specific constraints. Byzantine literature is the successor to Ancient Greek literature and forms the basis of Modern Greek literature, although it overlaps with both periods.

The tradition saw the competing influences of Hellenism, Christianity, and earlier in the empire's history, Paganism. There was a general flourishing of gnomai, hagiography, sermons, and particularly historiography, which became less individual-focused. Poetry was often limited to musical hymnal forms, or the more niche epigram tradition, while ancient dramas and epics became obsolete. The influential romantic epic Digenes Akritas is a major exception.

Until recent scholarship from Alexander Kazhdan, Simon Franklin and others, Byzantine literature was held in low regard by academia. It was previously considered either an inferior variant of Ancient Greek or biblical literature, or only important for its contributions to Modern Greek literature.

== Genres ==
The following account classifies Byzantine literature into five groups. The first three include representatives of those kinds of literature which continued the ancient traditions: historians and chroniclers, encyclopedists and essayists, and writers of secular poetry. The other two include new literary genres, ecclesiastical and theological literature, and popular poetry.

=== Historians and annalists ===
The two groups of secular prose literature show clearly the dual character of Byzantine intellectual life in its social, religious, and linguistic aspects. From this point of view, historical and annalistic literature supplement each other; the former is aristocratic and secular, the latter ecclesiastical and monastic; the former is classical, the latter popular. The works of the historians belong to scholarly literature, those of the annalists (or chroniclers) to the literature of the people. The former are carefully elaborated, the latter give only raw material, the former confine themselves to the description of the present and the most recent past, and thus have rather the character of contemporary records; the latter cover the whole history of the world as known to the Middle Ages. The former are therefore the more valuable for political history; the latter for the history of civilization.

==== Historians ====
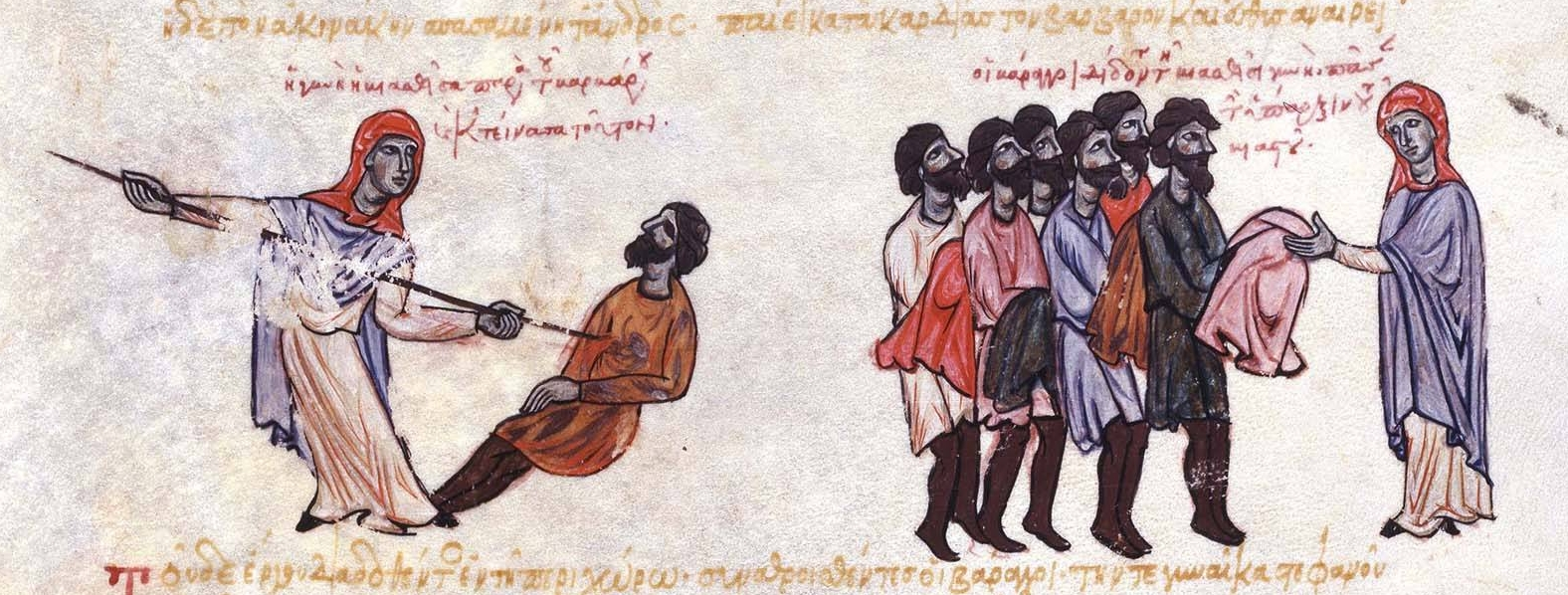
An illumination of a scene from the Skylitzes Chronicle, depicting a Thracesian woman killing a Varangian who tried to rape her, whereupon his comrades praised her and gave her his possessions.

Classical literary tradition set the standard for Byzantine historians in their grasp of the aims of history, the manner of handling their subjects, and in style of composition. Their works are thoroughly concrete and objective in character, without passion, and even without enthusiasm. Ardent patriotism and personal convictions are rarely evident. They are diplomatic historians, expert in the use of historical sources and in the polished tact called for by their social position; they are not cIoset-scholars, ignorant of the world, but men who stood out in public life: jurists like Procopius, Agathias, Evagrius, Michael Attaliates, statesmen like Joannes Cinnamus, Nicetas Acominatus, Georgius Pachymeres, Laonicus Chalcondyles; generals and diplomats like Nicephorus Bryennius the Younger, George Acropolites, Georgius Phrantzes; and even crowned heads, like Constantine Porphyrogenitus, Anna Comnena, John VI Cantacuzene, and others. The Byzantine historians thus represent not only the social but also the intellectual flower of their time, resembling in this their Greek predecessors, Herodotus, Thucydides, Xenophon, and Polybius, who became their guides and models. Sometimes a Byzantine chooses a classic writer to imitate in method and style. The majority, however, took as models several authors, a custom which gave rise to a peculiar mosaic style, quite characteristic of the Byzantines. While often the result of a real community of feeling, it effectively prevented development of an individual style.

The Atticist influence on Byzantine literature continued through later centuries. Nikephoros Bryennios the Younger and Joannes Cinnamus, in the 11th and 12th centuries, show the influence of Xenophon in their writing; 13th-century Nicephorus Gregoras took Plato as his model; and Leo Diaconus and Georgius Pachymeres emulated Homer.

While Byzantine historians were mostly dependent on foreign models, and seem to form a continuous series in which each succeeds the last, they do not blend into a uniform whole. Most of the historians come in either the period embracing the 6th and 7th centuries during the reigns of the East-Roman emperors, or that extending from the 11th to the 15th century under the Comneni and the Palaeologi. At its zenith under the Macedonian dynasty (the 9th and 10th centuries) the Byzantine world produced great heroes, but no great historians, excepting the solitary figure of the Emperor Constantine VII Porphyrogenitus.

The first period is dominated by Procopius because of his subject matter and his literary importance. Typically Byzantine, his Anekdota depreciates Emperor Justinian I as emphatically as his Peri Ktismaton apotheosizes him. In literature and history though, he follows classical models, as is evident in the precision and lucidity of his narrative acquired from Thucydides, and in the reliability of his information, qualities of special merit in the historian. Procopius, and to a great degree his successor, Agathias, remain the models of descriptive style as late as the 11th century. Procopius is the first representative of the ornate Byzantine style in literature and in this is surpassed only by Theophylaktos Simokattes in the 7th century. Despite their unclassical form, however, they approach the ancients in their freedom from ecclesiastical and dogmatic tendencies.

Between the historical writings of the first period and those of the second, there is an isolated series of works which in matter and form offer a strong contrast to both the aforesaid groups. These are the works under the name of the Emperor Constantine VII Porphyrogenitus (10th century), dealing respectively with the administration of the empire, its political division, and the ceremonies of the Byzantine Court. They treat of the internal conditions of the empire, and the first and third are distinguished by their use of a popular tongue. The first is an important source of ethnological information, while the last is an interesting contribution to the history of civilization.

The second group of historians present a classical eclecticism veiling an unclassical partisanship and theological fanaticism. Revelling in classical forms, the historians of the period of the Comneni and Palaeologi were devoid of the classical spirit. While many had stronger, more sympathetic personalities than the school of Procopius, the very vigor of these individuals and their close ties to the imperial government served to hamper their objectivity, producing subjective, partisan works. Thus the "Alexiad", the pedantic work of Princess Anna Comnena, glorifies her father Alexius and the imperial reorganization he began; the historical work of her husband, Nicephorus Bryennius, describes the internal conflicts that accompanied the rise of the Comneni in the form of a family chronicle (late 11th century); John VI Cantacuzene self-complacently narrates his own achievements (14th century). This group exhibits striking antitheses both personal and objective. Beside Cinnamus, who honestly hated everything Western, stand the broad-minded Nicetas Acominatus (12th century) and the conciliatory but dignified Georgius Acropolites (13th century); beside the theological polemicist Pachymeres (13th century), stands the man of the world, Nicephorus Gregoras (14th century), well versed in philosophy and the classics. Though subjective in matters of internal Byzantine history, these and others of this period are trustworthy in their accounts of external events, and especially valuable as sources for the first appearance of the Slavs and Turks.

==== Chroniclers ====
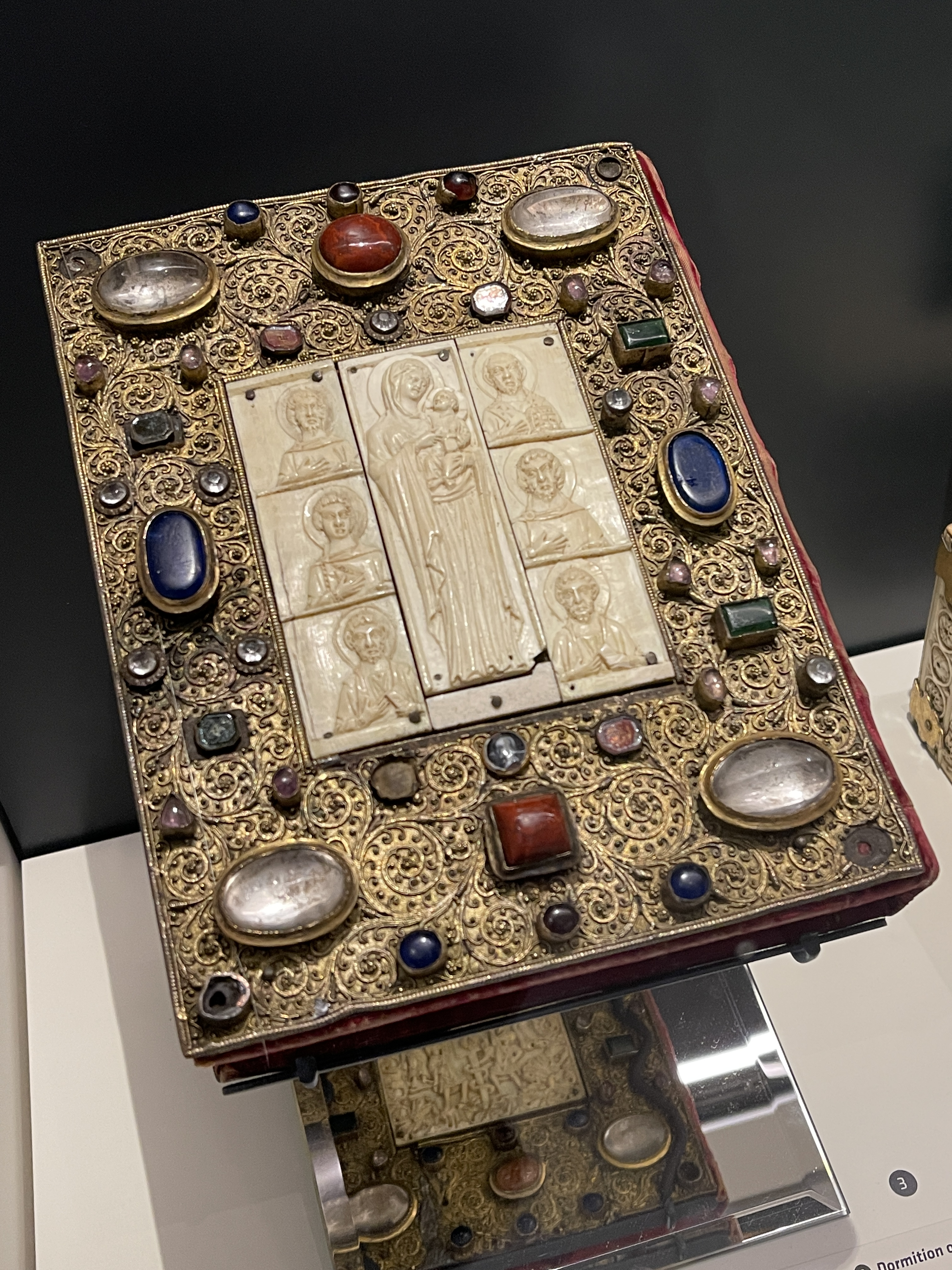
A Byzantine Gospel of the 13th century, it shows the increasing trend towards the use of Ivory as an artistic tool.

Unlike the historical works, Byzantine chronicles were intended for the general public; hence the difference in their origin, development, and diffusion, as well as in their character, method, and style. While the roots of the chronicle have not yet been satisfactorily traced, their comparatively late appearance (6th century) and total remove from Hellenistic tradition places their origins as fairly recent. The chronicle literature is originally foreign to Greek civilization, the first of which was composed by uneducated Syrians. Its presumable prototype, the "Chronography" of Sextus Julius Africanus, points to an Oriental Christian source. Unconnected with persons of distinction and out of touch with the great world, it follows models bound within its own narrow sphere. The 9th century saw the zenith of the Byzantine chronicle, during the nadir of historical literature. Afterwards it declines abruptly; the lesser chroniclers, seen as late as the 12th century, draw partly from contemporary and partly, though rarely, from earlier historians. In the Palaeologi period no chroniclers of note appear.

Not only important sources for the history of Byzantine civilization, the chronicles also contributed to the spread of Byzantine culture to the Slavic, Magyar, and Turkic peoples.

Representative Byzantine chronicles are the three of Joannes Malalas, Theophanes Confessor, and Joannes Zonaras, respectively. The first is the earliest Christian Byzantine monastic chronicle, composed in the Antioch in the 6th century by a hellenized Syrian and Monophysite theologian. Originally a city chronicle, it was expanded into a world-chronicle. It is a popular historical work, full of historical and chronological errors, and the first monument of a purely popular Hellenistic civilization. The chief source for most of the later chroniclers as well as for a few church historians, it is also the earliest popular history translated into Old Church Slavonic (c. early 10th century). Superior in substance and form, and more properly historical, is the Chronicle of Theophanes, a 9th-century monk of Asia Minor, and in its turn a model for later chronicles. It contains much valuable information from lost sources, and its importance for the Western world is due to the fact that by the end of the 9th century it had to be translated into Latin. A third guide-post in the history of Byzantine chronicles is the 12th-century Universal Chronicle of Zonaras. It reflects somewhat the atmosphere of the Comneni renaissance; not only is the narrative better than that of Theophanes, but many passages from ancient writers are worked into the text. It was translated not only into Slavic and Latin, but into Italian and French as well (16th century).

=== Encyclopedists and essayists ===
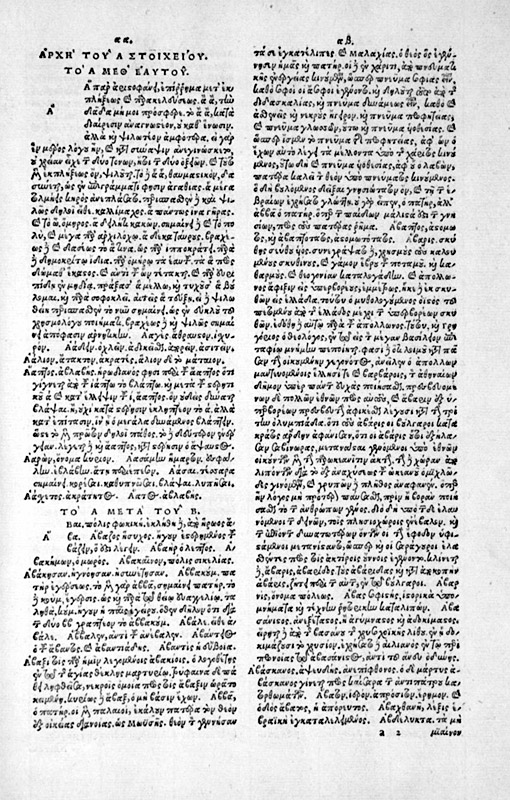
A page from a 16th-century edition of the vast Byzantine encyclopaedia, the Suda.

The spirit of antiquarian scholarship awoke in Byzantium earlier than in the West, but begun by lay theologians, not laymen. For this reason it always had a scholastic flavor; the Byzantine humanistic spirit savored of antiquity and the Middle Ages in equal proportion. Primarily directed to the systematic collection and sifting of manuscripts, a pronounced interest in the literature of Greek antiquity first manifested at Constantinople in the late 9th century. With the 12th century begins the period of original works imitating antique models, a revival of the Alexandrian essay and rhetorical literature, a number of writers showing vigorous originality. Quite isolated between the two periods stands Michael Psellus (11th century), a universal genius who bridges the periods. While the humanism of the 9th and 10th centuries retained a theological coloring and a hostile attitude towards the West, the 12th to the 14th century saw several writers seeking to break away from orthodox classicism to attain a true humanism, becoming the forerunners of the Italian Renaissance.

The new spirit first found expression in an academy founded for classical studies at Constantinople in 863. About the same time the broadly trained and energetic Photius, patriarch of the city and the greatest statesman of the Greek Church (820–897), enthusiastically collected forgotten manuscripts, revived forgotten works of antiquity, and re-discovered lost works; his attention was chiefly directed to prose works, indicative of his pragmatism. Photius made selections or excerpts from all the works he discovered, forming the beginning of his celebrated Bibliotheca ("Library"), which while dry and schematic remains the most valuable literary compendium of the Middle Ages, containing trustworthy summaries of many ancient works now lost, together with good characterizations and analyses such as those of Lucian and Heliodorus. This encyclopedic activity was more assiduously pursued in the 10th century, particularly in the systematic collecting of materials associated with Emperor Constantine VII Porphyrogenitus. Scholars also formed great compilations, arranged by subject, on the basis of older sources. Among these was a now-fragmentary encyclopedia of political science containing extracts from the classical, Alexandrian, and Roman Byzantine periods. These, with the collection of ancient epigrams known as the Anthologia Palatina and the scientific dictionary known as the Suda, make the 10th century that of the encyclopedias.

A typical representative of the period appears in the following century in the person of the greatest encyclopedist of Byzantine literature, Michael Psellus. Standing between the Middle Ages and modern times, he is a jurist and a man of the world with a mind both receptive and productive. Unlike Photius, who was more concerned with individual philosophic arguments, Psellus does not undervalue the old philosophers, and is himself of a philosophic temperament. He was the first of his intellectual circle to raise the philosophy of Plato above that of Aristotle and to teach philosophy as a professor. Surpassing Photius in intellect and wit, he lacks that scholar's dignity and solidity of character. A restless brilliance characterized his life and literary activity. At first a lawyer, then a professor; now a monk, now a court official; he ended his career the prime minister. He was equally adroit and many-sided in his literary work; in harmony with the polished, pliant nature of the courtier is his elegant Platonic style of his letters and speeches. His extensive correspondence furnishes endless material illustrating his personal and literary character. The ennobling influence of his Attic models mark his speeches and especially his funerary orations; that delivered on the death of his mother shows deep sensibility. Psellus had more of a poetic temperament than Photius, as several of his poems show, though they owe more to satirical fancy and occasion than to deep poetic feeling. Though Psellus exhibits more formal skill than creativity, his endowments shone forth in a time particularly backward in aesthetic culture. The intellectual freedom of the great scholars (polyhistores), both ecclesiastical and secular, of the following centuries would be inconceivable without the triumph of Psellus over Byzantine scholasticism.

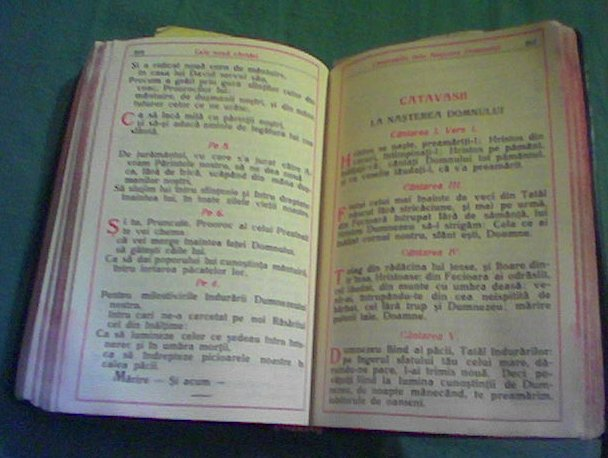
A Modern copy of a Byzantine Horologion, showing the daily cycle of the Eastern Orthodox Church.

While among his successors—such as Nicephorus Blemmydes and Hyrtakenos—are natures as corrupt as Psellus' own, the majority are marked by their rectitude of intention, sincerity of feeling, and their beneficently broad culture. Among these great intellects and strong characters of the 12th century several theologians are especially conspicuous, for example Eustathius of Thessalonica, Michael Italicus, and Michael Acominatus; in the 13th and 14th centuries several secular scholars, like Maximus Planudes, Theodorus Metochites, and above all, Nicephorus Gregoras.

The three theologians may best be judged by their letters and minor occasional writings. Eustathius seems to be the most important, writing learned commentary on Homer and Pindar alongside original works that are candid, courageous, and controversial, intent upon the correction of every evil. In one of his works he attacks the corruption and intellectual stagnation of the monastic life of that day; in another polemic, he assails the hypocrisy and sham holiness of his time; in a third he denounces the conceit and arrogance of the Byzantine priests.

The rhetorician Michael Italicus, later a bishop, attacks the chief weakness of Byzantine literature, external imitation; this he did on receiving a work by a patriarch, which was simply a disorderly collection of fragments from other writers, so poorly put together that the sources were immediately recognizable.

The pupil and friend of Eustathius, Michael Acominatus (12th and 13th centuries) Archbishop of Athens and brother of the historian Nicetas Acominatus. His inaugural address, delivered on the Acropolis, exhibits both profound classical scholarship and high enthusiasm despite the material and spiritual decay of his times. These pitiful conditions moved him to compose an elegy, famous because unique, on the decay of Athens, a sort of poetical and antiquarian apostrophe to fallen greatness. Gregorovius compared the inaugural address with Gregory the Great's to the Romans, and this with the lament of Bishop Hildebert of Tours on the demolition of Rome by the Normans (1106). His funeral orations over Eustathius (1195) and his brother Nicetas, though wordier and rhetorical, still evinced a noble disposition and deep feeling. Michael, like his brother, remained a fanatical opponent of the Latins. They had driven him into exile at Ceos, whence he addressed many letters to his friends illustrating his character. Stylistically influenced by Eustathius, his otherwise classical diction sounded an ecclesiastical note.

With Theodore Metochites and Maximos Planoudes we come to the universal scholars (polyhistores) of the time of the Palaeologi. The former displays his humanism in his use of hexameter, the latter in his knowledge of the Latin; both of which are otherwise unknown in Byzantium, and foreboding a broader grasp of antiquity. Both men show a fine sense of poetry, especially of nature poetry. Metochites composed meditations on the beauty of the sea; Planudes was the author of a long poetic idyll, a genre uncultivated by Byzantine scholars. While Metochites was a thinker and poet, Planudes was chiefly an imitator and compiler. Metochites was more speculative, as his collection of philosophical and historical miscellanies show; Planudes was more precise, as his preference for mathematics proves. Contemporary progress in philosophy was at a point where Metochites could openly attack Aristotle. He deals more frankly with political questions, such as his comparison of democracy, aristocracy, and monarchy. While his breadth of interest was large, Metochites's culture rests wholly on a Greek basis, though Planudes, by his translations from the Latin (Cato, Ovid, Cicero, Caesar, and Boethius), vastly enlarged the Eastern intellectual horizon.

This inclination toward the West is most noticeable in Nicephorus Gregoras, the great pupil of Metochites. His project for a reform of the calendar ranks him among the modern intellects of his time, as will be proven if ever his numerous works in every domain of intellectual activity are brought to light. His letters, especially, promise a rich harvest. His method of exposition is based on that of Plato, whom he also imitated in his ecclesiastico-political discussions, e.g. in his dialogue "Florentius, or Concerning Wisdom." These disputations with Barlaam dealt with the question of church union, in which Gregoras took the Unionist part. This brought him bitter hostility and the loss of his teaching living; he had been occupied chiefly with the exact sciences, whereby he had already earned the hatred of orthodox Byzantines.

While the Byzantine essayists and encyclopedists stood wholly under the influence of ancient rhetoric, still they embodied in the traditional forms their own characteristic knowledge, and thereby lent it a new charm.

=== Secular poetry ===
Poetry likewise had its prototypes, each genre tracing its origins to an ancient progenitor. Unlike the prose, these new genres do not follow from the classical Attic period, for the Byzantines wrote neither Iyrics nor dramas, imitating neither Pindar nor Sophocles. Imitating the literature of the Alexandrian period, they wrote romances, panegyrics, epigrams, satires, and didactic and hortatory poetry, following the models of Heliodorus and Achilles Tatius, Asclepiades and Posidippus, Lucian and Longus. Didactic poetry looks to an earlier prototype by Isocrates' Ad Demonicum. The poetic temperament of the Byzantines is thus akin to that of the Alexandrian writers. Only one new type evolved independently by the Byzantines—the begging-poem. The six genres are not contemporaneous: the epigram and the panegyric developed first (6th and 7th centuries), then, at long intervals, satire, next didactic and begging poetry, finally the romance. Only after the 12th century, the period of decay, do they appear side by side. The epigram was the only form of secular poetry that had an independent revival in Byzantine literature, and this at the very time when ecclesiastical poetry also reached its highest perfection, in the 6th and 7th centuries. This age is therefore the most flourishing period of Byzantine scholarly poetry; its decline in the 12th century is contemporary with the rise of popular poetry. The chief kinds of poetry during the period of the decline (11th to 13th century) were satire and parody, didactic and hortatory poetry, the begging-poem, and the erotic romance. In form this literature is characterized by its extensive use of the popular forms of speech and verse, the latter being the "political" verse (Greek ἡμαξευμένοι στίχοι, called "that abominable make-believe of a metre" by Charles Peter Mason in William Smith's Dictionary), an iambic verse of fifteen syllables, still the standard verse of modern Greek popular poetry. In content, however, all this literature continues to bear the imprint of Byzantine erudition.

==== Epigram ====
The epigram suited the Byzantine taste for the ornamental and for intellectual ingenuity. It corresponded exactly to the concept of the minor arts that attained high development in the Byzantine period. Making no lofty demands on the imagination of the author, its chief difficulty lay rather in technique and the attainment of the utmost possible pregnancy of phrase. Two groups may be distinguished among the Byzantine epigrammatists: one pagan and humanistic, the other Christian. The former is represented chiefly by Agathias (6th century) and Christophorus of Mitylene (11th century), the latter by the ecclesiastics Georgius Pisides (7th century) and Theodorus Studites (9th century). Between the two groups, in point of time as well as in character, stands Joannes Geometres (10th century).

The chief phases in the development of the Byzantine epigram are most evident in the works of these three. Agathias, who has already been mentioned among the historians, as an epigrammatist, has the peculiarities of the school of the semi-Byzantine Egyptian Nonnus (about AD 400). He wrote in an affected and turgid style, in the classical form of the hexameter; he abounds, however, in brilliant ideas, and in his skillful imitation of the ancients, particularly in his erotic pieces, he surpasses most of the epigrammatists of the imperial period. Agathias also prepared a collection of epigrams, partly his own and partly by other writers, some of which afterwards passed into the Anthologia Palatina and have thus been preserved. The abbot Theodorus Studites is in every respect the opposite of Agathias, a pious man of deep earnestness, with a fine power of observation in nature and life, full of sentiment, warmth, and simplicity of expression, free from servile imitation of the ancients, though influenced by Nonnus. While touching on the most varied things and situations, his epigrams on the life and personnel of his monastery offer special interest for the history of civilization. Joannes Geometres combines aspects of the previous two. During the course of his life he filled both secular and ecclesiastical offices and his poetry had a universal character; of a deeply religious temper, still he appreciated the greatness of the ancient Greeks. Alongside epigrams on ancient poets, philosophers, rhetoricians, and historians stand others on famous Church Fathers, poets, and saints. Poetically, the epigrams on contemporary and secular topics are superior to those on religious and classic subjects. His best works depict historical events and situations he himself experienced, and reflect his own spiritual moods (Krumbacher).

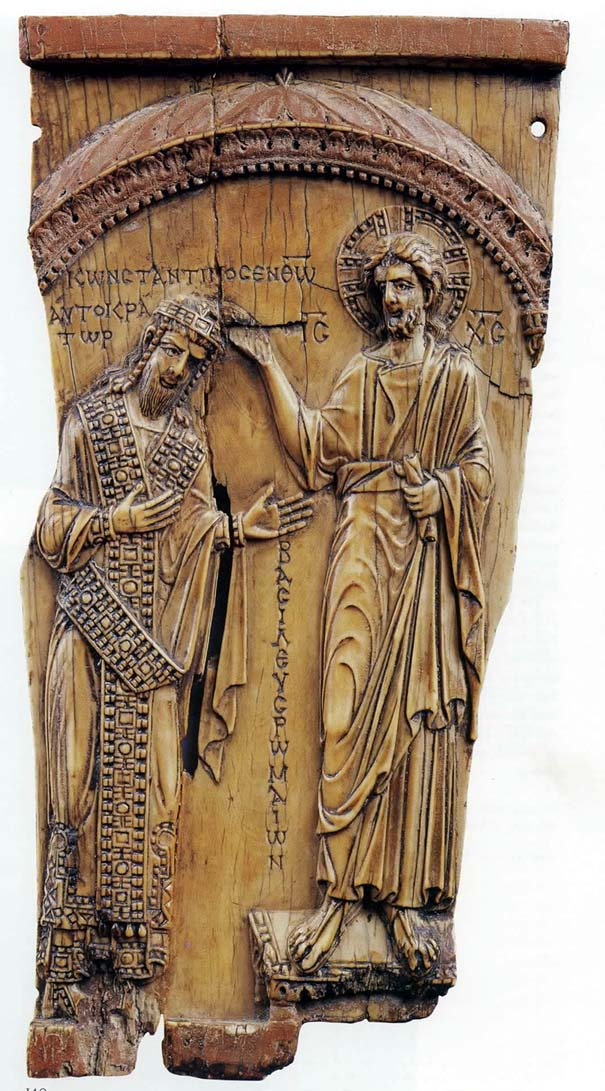
The Scholar Emperor Constantine VII, being crowned by Christ.

==== Panegyrics ====
Even the best writers often could not escape composing the official panegyrics on emperors and their achievements. Typical of this kind of literature are the commemorative poem of Paulus Silentiarius on the dedication of the church of St. Sophia, and that of Georgius Pisides on the glory of the prince. Unfavorable conclusions must not be drawn as to the character of these poets, for such eulogies were composed by not only courtiers like Psellus and Manuel Holobolos (13th century), but also by independent characters like Eustathius and Michael Acominatus. It had become traditional, and so handed down from imperial Rome to Byzantium as a part of ancient rhetoric with all the extravagance of a thoroughly decadent literature (F. Gregorovius). It was a sort of necessary concession to despotism; popular taste was not in general offended by it.

==== Satires ====
The father of Byzantine satire is Lucian. His celebrated "Dialogues of the Dead" furnished the model for two works, one of which, the "Timarion" (12th century) is marked by more rude humour, the other, "Mazaris" (15th century), by keen satire. Each describes a journey to the underworld and conversations with dead contemporaries; in the former their defects are lashed with good-natured raillery; in the latter, under the masks of dead men, living persons and contemporary conditions, especially at the Byzantine Court, are sharply stigmatized. The former is more a literary satire, the latter a political pamphlet, with keen personal thrusts and without literary value, but with all the greater interest for the history of civilization; the former is in a genuinely popular tone, the latter in vulgar and crude [Cf. Tozer in The Journal of Hellenic Studies (1881), II.233-270; Krumbacher, op. cit., 198–211.]

Two popular offshoots of the "Timarion", the "Apokopos" and the "Piccatoros" are discussed below. Another group of satires takes the form of dialogues between animals, manifestly a development from the Christian popular book known as the Physiologus. Such satires describe assemblages of quadrupeds, birds, and fishes, and recite their lampooning remarks upon the clergy, the bureaucracy, the foreign nations in the Byzantine Empire, etc. See also An Entertaining Tale of Quadrupeds

Here belong also the parodies in the form of church poems, and in which the clergy themselves took part, e.g. Bishop Nicetas of Serræ (11th century). One example of this sacrilegious literature, though not fully understood, is the "Mockery of a Beardless Man," in the form of an obscene liturgy (14th century).

==== Didactic ====
Didactic poetry found its model in the "To Demonikos" ascribed to Isocrates. The greatest example of this type of literature in Byzantium is the "Spaneas" (12th century), a hortatory poem addressed by an emperor to his nephew, a sort of "Mirror for Princes". Some few offshoots from this are found in the popular literature of Crete in the 15th and 16th centuries, handed down under the names of Sahlikis and Depharanus. Here also belong the ranting theological exhortations resembling those of the Capuchin in Schiller's "Wallenstein". Such, for instance, are that of Geogillas after the great plague of Rhodes (1498) and the oracular prophecies on the end of the Byzantine empire current under the name of Emperor Leo (886–911). (Krumbacher, 332, 336, 343, 352, 366.)

==== Begging-poem ====
A late Byzantine variety of the laudatory poem is the begging-poem, the poetical lament of hungry authors and the parasites of the court. Its chief representatives are Theodorus Prodromus and the grossly flattering Manuel Philes, the former of whom lived under the Comneni (12th century), the latter under the Palaeologi (13th century). For historians such poetical wails of distress as Prodromus addressed to the emperor are of value because they give interesting pictures of street and business life in the capital. (Cf. Krumbacher, 324, 333.)

==== Romance novel ====
The ancient Greek novel was imitated by four writers of the 12th century: Eustathios Makrembolites, Theodore Prodromos, Niketas Eugenianos, and Constantine Manasses.

=== Ecclesiastical and theological literature ===
The first flowering of ecclesiastical literature of Byzantium is Hellenistic in form and Oriental in spirit. This period falls in the 4th century and is closely associated with the names of the Greek Fathers of Alexandria, Palestine, Jerusalem, Cyrene, and Cappadocia. Their works, which cover the whole field of ecclesiastical prose literature—dogma, exegesis, and homiletics—became canonical for the whole Byzantine period; the last important work is the ecclesiastical history of Evagrius. Beyond controversial writings against sectarians and the Iconoclasts, later works consist merely of compilations and commentaries, in the form of the so-called Catenae; even the Fountain of Knowledge of John of Damascus (8th century), the fundamental manual of Greek theology, though systematically worked out by a learned and keen intellect, is merely a gigantic collection of materials. Even the homily clings to a pseudo-classical, rhetorical foundation, and tends more to external breadth, not to inwardness and depth.

Only three kinds of ecclesiastical literature, which were as yet undeveloped in the 4th century, exhibit later an independent growth. These were the ecclesiastical poetry of the 6th century, popular lives of the saints of the 7th, and the mystic writings of the 11th and 12th centuries. The Catholic Encyclopedia suggests that classical forms were insufficient to express Christian thought to best effect: in several collections of early Christian correspondence it is not the rhythmic laws of Greek rhetorical style which govern the composition, but those of Semitic and Syriac prose. Cardinal Pitra hypothesizes that the rhythmic poetry of the Byzantines originates in the Jewish Psalms of the Septuagint. This rhythmic principle accords with the linguistic character of the later Greek, which used a stress accent as it had already been developed in Syriac poetry rather than the classical tonal accent.

Romanos the Melodist was the first great ecclesiastical poet of the Greeks to fully embrace the stress accent as a rhythmic principle. A contemporary and countryman of the chronicler Malalas, also a reformer of the Greek literary language, Romanos was a Syrian of Jewish descent, Christianized at an early age. What Malalas is to prose, Romanos is to the Christian poetry of the Greek Middle Ages. Though he did not go so far as Malalas, he released poetry from meters based on quantitative and tonal scansion; he brought it into harmony with the latest poetics prevailing in Syria as well as with the evolving character of the Greek language. Romanos soon went to Constantinople, where he became a deacon of the Hagia Sophia, and where he is said to have first developed his gift for hymn-writing.

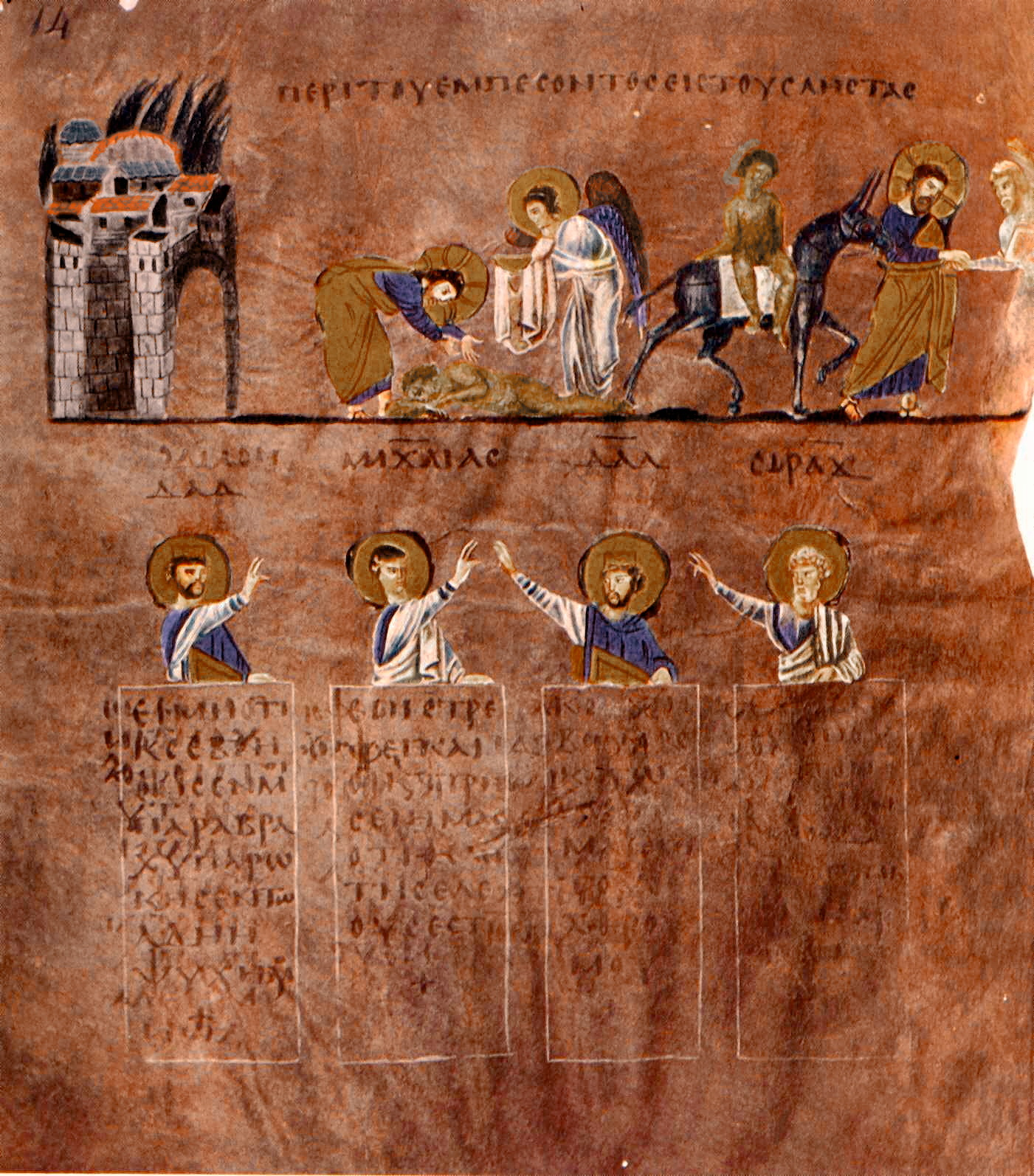
An illustration of the Parable of the Good Samaritan from the Rossano Gospels, believed to be the oldest surviving illustrated New Testament.

Romanos borrowed the form of his poems, the material, and many of their themes partly from the Bible and partly from the (metrical) homilies of the Syrian Father Ephrem (4th century). He wrote hymns on the Passion of the Lord, on the betrayal by Judas, Peter's denial, Mary before the Cross, the Ascension, the Ten Virgins, and the Last Judgment, while his Old Testament themes mention the history of Joseph and the three young men in the fiery furnace. He is said to have composed about a thousand hymns, of which only eighty have survived, evidently because in the 9th century the so-called canones, linguistically and metrically more artistic in form, replaced much of his work in the Greek Liturgy. Thenceforth his hymns held their own in only a few of the remoter monasteries. Characteristic of his technique is the great length of his hymns, which are regularly composed of from twenty to thirty stanzas (τροπαρια) of from twelve to twenty-one verses each, very finely wrought and varied in metrical structure, and in construction transparent and diverse. They do not resemble contemporary Latin hymns so much as the oratorios of the early 20th century, also using antiphonal rendering by alternative choirs. This also explains the dramatic character of many hymns, with their inserted dialogues and choric songs, as in "Peter's Denial", a little drama of human boastfulness and weakness, and the last part of the "History of Joseph", the "Psalm of the Apostles", and the "Birth of Jesus". Other pieces, like the hymn on the Last Judgment, are purely descriptive in character, though even in them the rhetorical and dogmatic elements seriously impair the artistic effect.

Some, like Bouvy and Krumbacher, place him among the greatest hymn-writers of all times; others, like Cardinal Pitra, are more conservative. For a final judgment a complete edition of the hymns is needed. Compared to Latin church poets such as Ambrose and Prudentius, his surviving works tend towards a more rhetorically flowery, digressive, and dogmatic verse. He is fond of symbolic pictures and figures of speech, antitheses, assonances, especially witty jeux d'esprit, which contrast with his characteristic simplicity of diction and construction. These embellishments interrupt the smooth flow of his lines, and often the sequence of thought in his hymns is clouded by the dragging in of dogmatic questions—in the celebrated Christmas hymn the question of the miraculous birth of Jesus is discussed four times, with a comfortable amplitude that betrays the theologian thrusting the poet aside. The theologian is also too evident in his allusions to the Old Testament when dealing with New Testament incidents; Mary at the birth of Jesus compares her destiny to that of Sarah, the Magi liken the star that went before the Israelites in the wilderness, and so on. The frequent citation of passages from the prophets seem more like unimpassioned paraphrases than like inspired poetry. In fact Romanos does not possess the abundant and highly coloured imagery of the earliest Greek church poets, nor their fine grasp of nature. The reader also gathers the impression that the height of the poet's imagination is not in proportion with the depth of his piety—there often appears in him something naive, almost homely, as when Mary expresses her pleasure in the Magi and calls attention to their utility for the impending Flight into Egypt. There are passages, however, in which devout fervor carries the imagination along with it and elevates the poetic tone, as in the jubilant invitation to the dance (in the Easter-song), in which thoughts of spring and of the Resurrection are harmoniously blended:

Why thus faint-hearted?
Why veil ye your faces?
Lift up your hearts!
Christ is arisen!
Join in the dances,
And with us proclaim it:
The Lord is ascended,
Gleaming and gloried,
He who was born
Of the giver of light.
Cease then your mourning,
Rejoice in blessedness:
Springtime has come.
So bloom now, ye lilies,
Bloom and be fruitful!
Naught bringeth destruction.
Clap we our hands
And shout: Risen is He
Who helpeth the fallen ones
To rise again.

Ecclesiastical poetry did not long remain on the high level to which Romanos had raised it. The "Hymnus Acathistus" (of unknown authorship) of the 7th century, a sort of Te Deum in praise of the Mother of God, is the last great monument of Greek church poetry, comparable to the hymns of Romanos, which it has even outlived in fame. It has had numerous imitators and as late as the 17th century was translated into Latin.

The rapid decline of Greek hymnology begins as early as the 7th century, the period of Andrew of Crete. Religious sentiments in hymns were choked by a classical formalism which stifled all vitality. The overvaluation of technique in details destroyed the sense of proportion in the whole. This seems to be the only explanation for the so-called canones first found in the collection of Andrew of Crete. While a canon is a combination of a number of hymns or chants (generally nine) of three or four strophes each, the "Great Canon" of Andrew actually numbers 250 strophes, a "single idea is spun out into serpentine arabesques".

Pseudo-classical artificiality found an even more advanced representative in John of Damascus, in the opinion of the Byzantines the foremost writer of canones, who took as a model Gregory of Nazianzus, even reintroducing the principle of quantity into ecclesiastical poetry. Religious poetry was in this way reduced to mere trifling, for in the 11th century, which witnessed the decline of Greek hymnology and the revival of pagan humanism, Michael Psellus began parodying church hymns, a practice that took root in popular culture. Didactic poems took this form without being regarded as blasphemous.

Religious drama did not thrive in the Byzantine era. The only example is the Suffering of Christ (Christus Patiens, Χριστὸς пάσχων ), written in the 11th or 12th century; of its 2,640 verses, about one-third are borrowed from ancient dramas, chiefly from those of Euripides, and Mary, the chief character, sometimes recites verses from the "Medea" of Euripides, again from the "Electra" of Sophocles, or the "Prometheus" of Aeschylus. The composition is evidently the production of a theologian trained in the classics, but without the slightest idea of dramatic art. It is made up chiefly of lamentations and reports of messengers. Even the most effective scenes, those which precede the Crucifixion, are described by messengers; almost two-thirds of the text are given to the descent from the Cross, the lament of Mary, and the apparition of Christ. (Cf. Van Cleef, "The Pseudo-Gregorian Drama Christos paschon in its relation to the text of Euripides" in Transactions of the Wisconsin Academy of Sciences, VIII, 363–378; Krumbacher, 312.)

Between ecclesiastical poetry and ecclesiastical prose stands the theologico-didactic poem, a favorite species of ancient Christian literature. One of its best examples is the "Hexaemeron" of Georgius Pisides, a spirited hymn on the universe and its marvels, i.e. all living creatures. Taken as a whole, it is somewhat conventional; only the description of the minor forms of life, especially of the animals, reveals the skill of the epigrammatist and nature-lover's gift of affectionate observation.

Besides sacred poetry, hagiography flourished from the 6th to the 11th century. This species of literature developed from the old martyrologies, and became the favorite form of popular literature. It flourished from the 8th to the 11th century, and was concerned principally with monastic life. Unfortunately, the rhetorical language was in violent contrast with the simple nature of the contents, so that the chief value of this literature is historical.

Sixth- and seventh-century hagiographers adopted a more accessible style. The most prominent was Cyril of Scythopolis, whose biographies of Palestinian monks and saints are noted for their chronological precision and factual detail. Another notable author of this period was Leontios of Neapolis, Archbishop of Cyprus, who wrote in a popular vernacular; his Life of John the Merciful, Patriarch of Alexandria, provides insight into the daily life, social customs, and religious practices of the city's lower classes.

The romance of Balaam and Joasaph (also Barlaam and Josaphat) was another popular work of Byzantine origin now elevated to universal literature. It is the "Song of Songs" of Christian asceticism, illustrated by the experience of the Indian prince Joasaph, who is led by the hermit Barlaam to abandon the joys of life, and as a true Christian to renounce the world. The material of the story is originally Indian, indeed Buddhistic, for the origin of Joasaph was Buddha. The Greek version originated in the Sabbas monastery in Palestine about the middle of the 7th century. It did not circulate widely until the 11th century, when it became known to all Western Europe through the medium of a Latin translation [Cf. F. C. Conybeare, "The Barlaam and Josaphat legend," in Folk-lore (1896), VII, 101 sqq.]

The ascetic conception of life was embedded in the Byzantine character and was strengthened by the high development of monastic institutions. The latter in turn brought forth a broad ascetic literature, though it does not further deepen the asceticism of its great exponent, St. Basil of Caesarea.

Less extensively cultivated, but excelling in quality, are Byzantine mystical writings. The true founder of a distinctively Byzantine mysticism was Maximus the Confessor (7th century), who deepened the tradition of Christian Neoplatonism, as found in the Pseudo-Dionysius, with the resources of Orthodox Christology. No other writer in Eastern Christian tradition surpasses Maximus in speculative range and originality. Later representatives of this mystical tradition were Symeon the New Theologian and Nicetas Stethatos in the 11th, and Nikolaos Kavasilas in the 14th century. The Byzantine mystical writers differ from those of Western Europe chiefly in their attitude to ecclesiastical ceremonies, to which they adhered implicitly, seeing in it a profound symbol of the spiritual life of the church, where Occidentals see an attempt to displace the inner life with external pomp. Accordingly, Symeon strictly observed the ceremonial rules of the church, regarding them, however, only as a means to the attainment of ethical perfection. His principal work (published only in Latin) is a collection of prose pieces and hymns on communion with God. He is akin to the chief German mystics in his tendency towards pantheism. Of Symeon's equally distinguished pupil, Nicetas Stethatos, we need only say that he cast off his teacher's pantheistic tendencies. The last great mystic Kavasilas, Archbishop of Saloniki, revived the teaching of Dionysius the Pseudo-Areopagite, but in the plan of his principal work, "Life in Christ", exhibits a complete independence of all other worlds and is without a parallel in Byzantine asceticism.

=== Popular poetry ===
The capture of Constantinople and establishment of the Latin kingdoms in the year 1204 displaced or supplanted aristocratic and ecclesiastic controls on literary taste and style. In response to new influences from the Latin West, Byzantine popular literature moved in different directions. Whereas literary poetry springs from the rationalistic, classical atmosphere of the Hellenistic period, popular poetry, or folk-song, is an outgrowth of the idyllic, romantic literature of the same period. As the literary works had their prototypes in Lucian, Heliodorus, Achilles Tatius, and Nonnus, the popular works imitated Apollonius of Rhodes, Callimachus, Theocritus, and Musaeus.

The chief characteristic of folk-song throughout the Greek Middle Ages is its lyric note, which constantly finds expression in emotional turns. In Byzantine literature, on the other hand, the refinement of erotic poetry was due to the influence of the love-poetry of chivalry introduced by Frankish knights in the 13th century and later. The Byzantines imitated and adapted the romantic and legendary materials these westerners brought. Italian influences led to the revival of the drama. That celebration of the achievements of Greek heroes in popular literature was the result of the conflicts which the Greeks sustained during the Middle Ages with the border nations to the east of the empire. Popular books relating the deeds of ancient heroes had long-standing and widespread currency throughout the East; these too revived heroic poetry, though imparted with a deep romantic tinge. The result was a complete upheaval of popular ideals and a broadening of the popular horizon as Atticist tendencies were gradually eroded.

There was, consequently, a complete reconstruction of the literary types of Byzantium. Of all the varieties of artistic poetry there survived only the romance, though this became more serious in its aims, and its province expanded. Of metrical forms there remained only the political (fifteen-syllable) verse. From these simple materials there sprang forth an abundance of new poetic types. Alongside of the narrative romance of heroism and love there sprang up popular love lyrics, and even the beginnings of the modern drama.

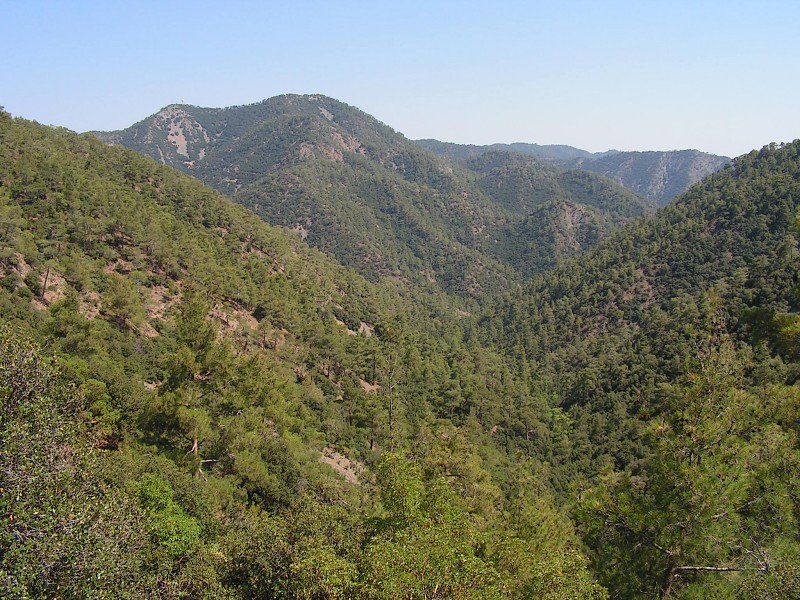
The Troodos Mountains, from which Digenis Akritas used to jump to Asia Minor in the epic poem

The only genuine heroic epic of the Byzantines is the Digenis Akritas, a popular poetic crystallization of the 10th- and 11th-century conflicts between the Byzantine wardens of the marches (ακρίτης, akrites) and the Saracens in Eastern Asia Minor. The nucleus of this epic goes back to the 12th or 13th century, its final literary form to the 15th. Though the schoolmen edited the original poems beyond recognition, an approximate idea of the original poem may be gathered from the numerous echoes of it extant in popular poetry. The existing versions exhibit a blending of several cycles, modeled after the Homeric poems. Its principal subjects are love, adventures, battles, and a patriarchal, idyllic enjoyment of life; it is a mixture of the Iliad and the Odyssey, the majority of the material being drawn from the latter, suffused with a Christian atmosphere. Genuine piety and a strong family feeling combine with an intimate sympathy with nature. Artistically, the work lacks the dramatic quality and diverse characters of the Germanic and classical Greek epics; it must be compared with the Slavic and Oriental heroic songs, among which it properly belongs.

The love-romance of the Greek Middle Ages is the result of the fusion of the sophistical Alexandro-Byzantine romance and the medieval French popular romance, on the basis of a Hellenistic view of life and nature. This is proved by its three chief creations, composed in the 13th and 14th centuries. Kallimachos and Chrysorrhoe, Belthandros and Chrysantza, Lybistros and Rhodamne. While the first and the last of these are markedly influenced by Byzantine romance in thought and manner of treatment, the second begins to show the aesthetic and ethical influence of the Old-French romance; indeed, its story often recalls the Tristan legend. The style is clearer and more transparent, the action more dramatic, than in the extant versions of the Digenis legend. The ethical idea is the romantic idea of knighthood—the winning of the loved one by valour and daring, not by blind chance as in the Byzantine literary romances. Along with these independent adaptations of French material, are direct translations from "Flore et Blanchefleur", "Pierre et Maguelonne", and others, which have passed into the domain of universal literature.

To the period of Frankish conquest belongs also the metrical Chronicle of the Morea (14th century). It was composed by a Frank brought up in Greece, though a foe of the Greeks. Its object was, amid the constantly progressing hellenization of the Western conquerors, to remind them of the spirit of their ancestors. Therefore, it is only Greek in language; in literary form and spirit it is wholly Frankish. The author "describes minutely the feudal customs which had been transplanted to the soil of Greece, and this perhaps is his chief merit; the deliberations of the High Court are given with the greatest accuracy, and he is quite familiar with the practice of feudal law" (J. Schmitt). As early as the 14th century the Chronicle was translated into Spanish and in the 15th into French and Italian.

About the same time and in the same locality the small islands off the coast of Asia Minor, appeared the earliest collection of neo-Greek love songs, known as the "Rhodian Love-Songs". Besides songs of various sorts and origins, they contain a complete romance, told in the form of a play on numbers, a youth being obliged to compose a hundred verses in honor of the maiden whom he worships before she returns his love, each verse corresponding to the numbers one to one hundred.

Between the days of the French influence in the 13th and 14th centuries and those of Italian in the 16th and 17th, there was a short romantic and popular revival of the ancient legendary material. There was neither much need nor much appreciation for this revival, and few of the ancient heroes and their heroic deeds are adequately treated. The best of these works is the Alexander Romance, based on the story of Alexander the Great, a revised version of the Pseudo-Callisthenes of the Ptolemaic period, which is also the source of the western versions of the Alexander Romance. The Achilleis, on the other hand, though written in the popular verse and not without taste, is wholly devoid of antique local colour, and is rather a romance of French chivalry than a history of Achilles. Lastly, of two compositions on the Trojan War, one is wholly crude and barbarous, the other, though better, is a literal translation of the old French poem of Benoît de Sainte-More.

To these products of the 14th century may be added two of the 16th, both describing a descent into the lower world, evidently popular offshoots of the Timarion and Mazaris already mentioned. To the former corresponds the Apokopos, a satire of the dead on the living; to the latter the Piccatores, a metrical piece decidedly lengthy but rather unpoetic, while the former has many poetical passages (e.g. the procession of the dead) and betrays the influence of Italian literature. In fact Italian literature impressed its popular character on the Greek popular poetry of the 16th and 17th centuries, as French literature had done in the 13th and 14th.

==== Cretan popular poetry ====
As a rich popular poetry sprang up during the last-mentioned period on the islands off the coast of Asia Minor, so now a similar literature developed on the island of Crete. Its most important creations are the romantic epic Erotokritos and the dramas Erophile and The Sacrifice of Abraham with a few minor pictures of customs and manners. These works fall chronologically outside the limits of Byzantine literature; nevertheless, as a necessary complement and continuation of the preceding period, they should be discussed here.

The Erotokritos is a long romantic poem of chivalry, lyric in characters and didactic in purpose, the work of Vitsentzos Kornaros, a hellenized Venetian of the 16th century. It abounds in themes and ideas drawn from the folk-poetry of the time. In the story of Erotokritos and Arethusa the poet glorifies love and friendship, chivalric courage, constancy, and self-sacrifice. Although foreign influences do not obtrude themselves, and the poem, as a whole, has a national Greek flavour, it reveals the various cultural elements, Byzantine, Romance, and Oriental, without giving, however, the character of a composite.

The lyrical love tragedy Erophile is more of a mosaic, being a combination of two Italian tragedies, with the addition of lyrical intermezzos from Torquato Tasso's Jerusalem Delivered, and choral songs from his Aminta. Nevertheless, the materials are handled with independence, and more harmoniously arranged than in the original; the father who has killed his daughter's lover is slain not by his daughter's hand, but by the women of his palace. Owing to the lyric undertone of the works some parts of it have survived in popular tradition until the present time.

The mystery play of The Sacrifice of Abraham is apparently an independent work. The familiar and trite Biblical incidents are reset in the patriarchal environment of Greek family life. The poet emphasizes the mental struggles of Sarah, the resignation of Abraham to the Divine will, the anxious forebodings of Isaac, and the affectionate sympathy of the servants, in other words, a psychological analysis of the characters. The mainspring of the action is Sarah's fore-knowledge of what is to happen, evidently the invention of the poet to display the power of maternal love. The diction is distinguished by high poetic beauty and by a thorough mastery of versification.

Other products of Cretan literature are a few adaptations of Italian pastorals, a few erotic and idyllic poems, like the so-called "Seduction Tale" (an echo of the Rhodian Love-Songs), and the lovely, but ultra-sentimental, pastoral idyll of the Beautiful Shepherdess.

== Legacy ==
The Roman supremacy in governmental life did not disappear. The subjection of the Church to the power of the State led to a governmental ecclesiasticism, causing friction with Roman Catholic Church, which had remained relatively independent.

Greek eventually overtook Latin as the official language of the government, the "Novellae" of Justinian I being the last Latin monument. As early as the 7th century Greek language had made great progress, and by the 11th Greek was supreme, though it never supplanted the numerous other languages of the empire.

The Eastern Roman Empire divided European civilization into two parts: one Romance and Germanic, the other Greek and Slavic. These cultures differed ethnographically, linguistically, ecclesiastically, and historically. Imperial Russia, the Balkans, and Ottoman Empire were the direct heirs of Byzantine civilization; the first two particularly in ecclesiastical, political, and cultural respects (through the translation and adaptation of sacred, historical, and popular literature); the third in respect to civil government.

Indirectly, the Empire protected western Europe for centuries from war, fighting off various invaders and migratory populations. Byzantium was also a treasury of ancient Greek literature. During the Middle Ages, until the capture of the Constantinople, the West was acquainted only with Roman literature. Greek antiquity was first carried to Italy by the treasures brought by fugitive Greek humanists, many of whom were delegates at the Council of Florence from 1431 to 1449.

Byzantine culture had a direct influence upon southern and central Europe in church music and church poetry, though this was only in the very early period (until the 7th century).

Digenes Akritas (Διγενῆς Ἀκρίτας) is the most famous of the Acritic songs and is often regarded as the only surviving epic poem from the Byzantine Empire. It is considered by some to signal the beginnings of modern Greek literature.

Byzantine culture had a definite impact upon the Near East, especially upon the Persians, and the Arabs.

== See also ==
- Byzantine philosophy
- Byzantine science
- Corpus Scriptorum Historiae Byzantinae
- Epistolography
- Greek scholars in the Renaissance
- Medieval Greek
- Byzantine literature of the Komnenian and Angelos periods
- Byzantine literature of the Laskaris and Palaiologos periods
- Byzantine literature of the Justinian era
- Byzantine literature of the Heraclian dynasty
