= Helberg =

Helberg is a surname. Notable people with the surname include:

- Claus Helberg (1919–2003), Norwegian resistance fighter and mountain guide
- Jacob Helberg (born 1989), American and French writer and technology advisor
- Robert J. Helberg (1906–1967), American aeronautical engineer
- Sandy Helberg (born 1949), German American actor
- Simon Helberg (born 1980), American actor and comedian

== See also ==
- Helberg (crater), lunar crater just behind the western limb of the Moon on the far side from the Earth
- Hellberg
- Hillberg
