= Pard =

Greek word for leopard

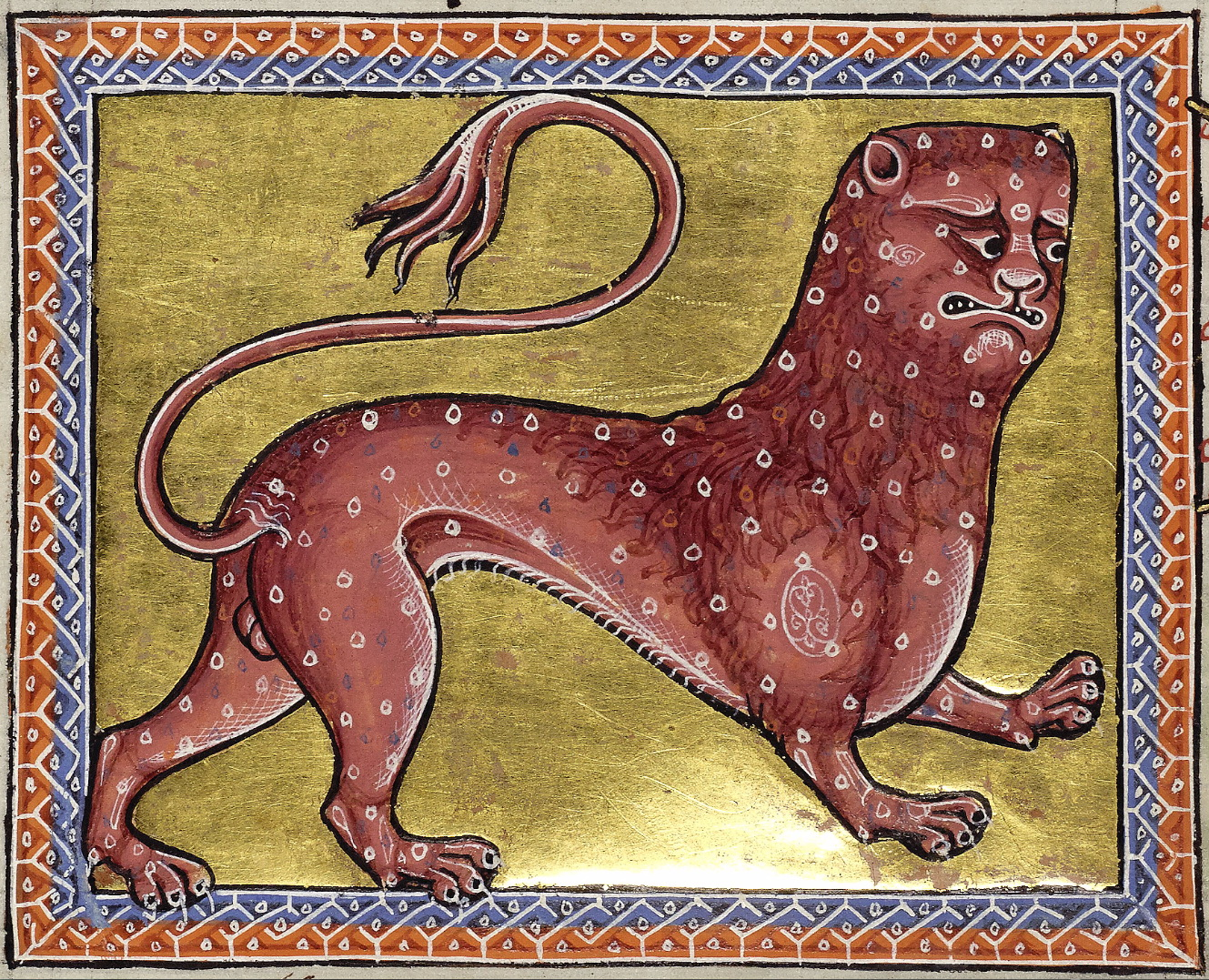
A leopard from the Aberdeen Bestiary manuscript.

Pard (Ancient Greek: πάρδος) is the Ancient Greek word for the leopard, which is listed in medieval bestiaries and in Pliny the Elder's book Natural History. Over the years, there have been many different depictions of the creature including some adaptations with and without manes and some in later years with shorter tails. However, one consistent representation shows them as large felines often with spots.

== History ==
One of the earliest known references to this creature appears in Pliny the Elder's book Natural History (in Book 8, chapter 17: "Lions: How they are Produced"). In it, Pliny writes about the origin of cheetahs (though he does not have a clearly separate word for these animals) which were believed to be a hybrid animal (like mules or ligers) resulting from the union between a promiscuous lioness and the pard, i.e. the leopard. In fact, the word leopardos (λεόπαρδος) or leontopardos (λεοντόπαρδος), Greek for 'cheetah', comes from the combination of the word leo (Greek for 'lion') and pardos, 'spotted'. The pard itself is described as being maneless like the female lion with a distinct odor. Pliny also states that the sexual passion between the pard and lioness is so violent that it enrages the male lion, who will often seek revenge on a lioness when smelling the pard. Because of this, the lioness will wash the pard's scent from her or follow the pride at a distance after mating.

By the medieval era, pards were commonplace in books and artwork where various depictions of them are shown (some even including "bearded manes"). In the seventh-century book Etymologies, Isidore of Seville describes their coats as being mottled like a giraffe's. He goes on to describe them as being "headlong for blood" by being capable of killing their prey in a single leap. The author references Pliny the Elder's work by reaffirming that pards were the sires of cheetahs from lionesses.

It was not until the 13th century that pards acquired their mythical reputation for being bloodthirsty and almost demonic creatures, primarily thanks to the MS Bodley 764 Bestiary. In this source, their spots were said to symbolize sins, the devil, or even the variety of vices in mankind. It even claims that the Antichrist comes in the form of a pard. Despite the mention of their spots, in this bestiary pards are often illustrated without spots. Instead, they are colored and maned like a lion with a human-like, grinning face.

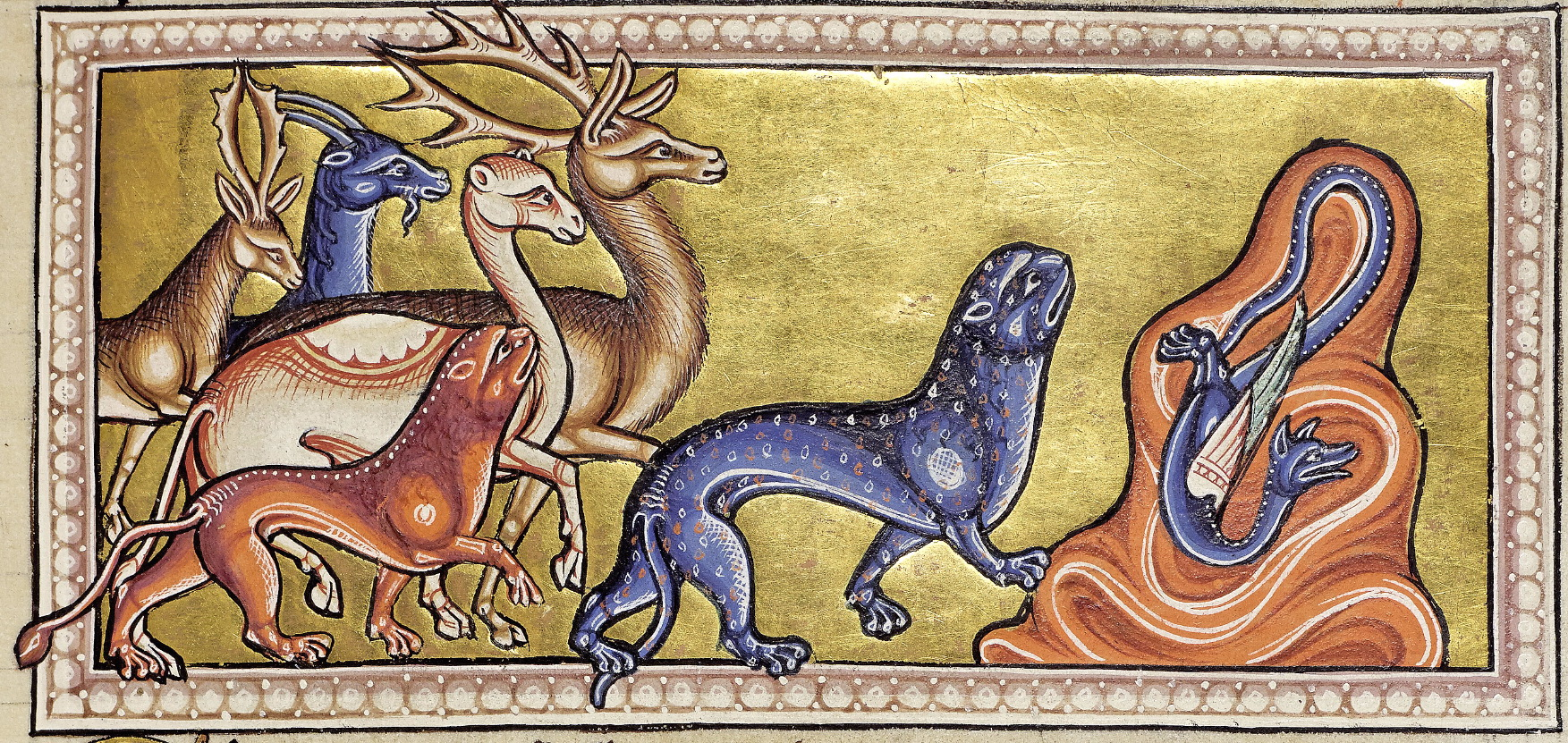
Depiction of a "panther" from the Aberdeen Bestiary 1200 AD. Pards are now believed to be leopards or black panthers.

Yet ironically, in the same century, the different writers of the Aberdeen Bestiary oppositely describe the pard (borrowing in this case from the panther) as a beautiful and gentle creature whose only enemy is the dragon. It is said to sleep for three days after filling its stomach and arise, carrying with it a sweet scent from its mouth which attracts all animals except the dragon. Its roar is said to terrify the dragon into fleeing to its den. In this bestiary, the creature is said to symbolize Jesus Christ who opposes the devil. This bestiary also features the most accurate illustrations of the pard, depicting a creature with dark fur, spots, and no mane.

By the 14th century, pards are characterized again as real animals. The Byzantine poem "An Entertaining Tale of Quadrupeds," describes pards (also called "cat-pards" and "leopards" interchangeably in the text) as being resistant to fleas--and thus good for using their pelts as bedspreads. Their tails are noted as being "comically" short like a lynx's and that the creature often lives in quarries.

Finally, by the 1700s, despite centuries of confusion, scientists understood cheetahs and leopards to be their own, independent species of cat and not the offspring of pards and lions.

== Etymology ==
The English noun pard derives from Middle English parde, from Old French via Latin pardus, from Greek πάρδος, párdos ("male panther"). The word pard is probably of Iranian origin; akin to Sogdian purdhank and Persian پلنگ palang.

== In English literature ==
The pard is mentioned in Shakespeare's As You Like It ("Then a soldier, Full of strange oaths, and bearded like the pard, Jealous in honour, sudden and quick in quarrel...") and John Keats's "Ode to a Nightingale ("...not charioted by Bacchus and his pards.").
