= Hilberg =

Hilberg is a surname. Notable people with the surname include:

- Isidor Hilberg (1852–1919), Austrian classical scholar
- Raul Hilberg (1926–2007), Austrian-born American political scientist and historian

== See also ==
- Hilbert (name)
- Hillberg
