= Hellberg =

Hellberg is a Swedish surname. Notable people with the surname include:

- Björn Hellberg (born 1944), Swedish sports journalist, author, and TV personality
- Magnus Hellberg (born 1991), Swedish ice hockey player
- Martin Hellberg (1905–1999), German actor, director and writer
- Mattias Hellberg (born 1973), Swedish musician
- Niklas Hellberg (born 1964), Swedish musician
- Owe Hellberg (born 1953), Swedish politician

== See also ==
- Helberg
- Hellborg
- Hillberg
