= Byzantine literature of the Komnenian and Angelid periods =

Period of Byzantine literature from 1081 to 1204

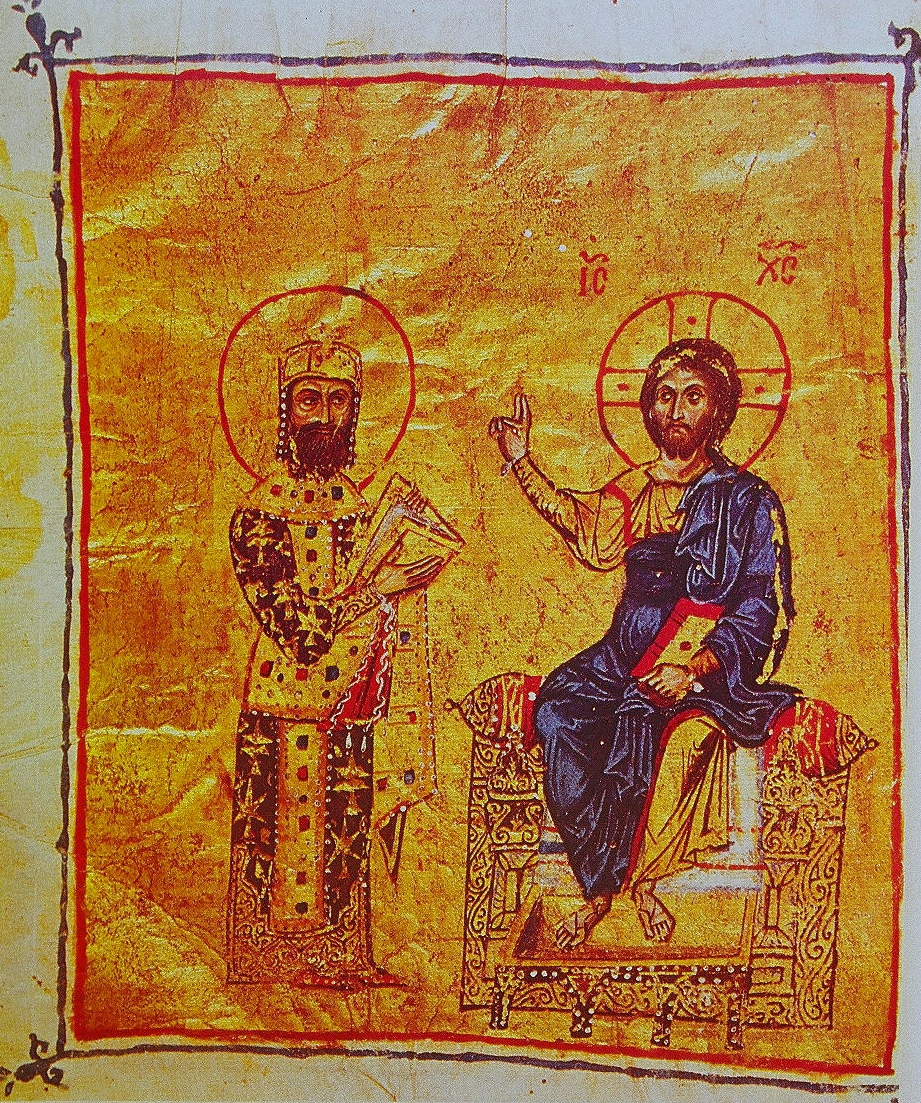
Alexios I Komnenos blessed by Christ

Byzantine literature of the Komnenian and Angelid periods refers to the period of Byzantine literature from the ascension of Emperor Alexios I Komnenos to the throne in 1081 to the Sack of Constantinople to the Crusaders in 1204.

The restoration of the Byzantine Empire by the Komnenian dynasty after the defeats of the 1070s brought a flourishing of Byzantine literature. In historiography, notable figures include Nikephoros Bryennios and his wife Anna Komnene, with John Kinnamos emerging in the following generation. The Komnenian era was also the last period of vitality for Byzantine chronicle writing. Highly popular works were created by authors such as Joannes Zonaras, Constantine Manasses, and Michael Glykas, who was also a theologian, epistolographer, and poet. The period of turmoil and intense religious disputes resulted in the work of prominent polemic theologians: Euthymios Zigabenos, Nicholas of Methone, and Andronikos Kamateros. The imperial efforts aimed at reconciling the divided church were reflected in the works of Theorianus and Nicetas of Thessalonica.

The Komnenian era in literature was marked by a focus on commentaries and a return to classical antiquity. Theologians (Theophylact of Ohrid, Euthymios Zigabenos, Nicetas of Thessalonica) wrote commentaries on the Scriptures and classical theological works, philosophers (Eustratius of Nicaea, Michael of Ephesus) commented on Aristotle, while philologists (Eustathius of Thessalonica, John Tzetzes) produced commentaries on Homer, Hesiod, Pindar, and Aristophanes. Numerous anonymous dictionaries were created, providing definitions of works by individual classical authors, as well as linguistic and etymological explanations.

The most outstanding poet of this period, Theodore Prodromos, turned to classical literary genres: parody, dialogue, satire, epigram, sophistic romance, and didactic poetry. Under Prodromos' influence, the sophistic romance in verse and prose, as well as satire, developed. This period also saw the emergence of the only known drama in Byzantine literature. Dialogue works were written by Prodromos, Philip Monotropos, and Michael Hapluchir, while didactic poems were penned by John Kamateros and Luke Chrysoberges. Rhetorical works, always vital in Byzantium, were represented by Michael Choniates and John Italus during this time.

== Historians and chroniclers ==
The reigns of three eminent rulers from the Komnenian dynasty – Alexios I (1081–1118), John II (1118–1143), and Manuel I (1143–1180) – produced three notable historians. The first was Nikephoros Bryennios (1081–1137), who, in 1097, married Anna, the daughter of Emperor Alexios I, by imperial decree. At the request of Empress Irene, Bryennios gathered historical materials for a work meant to glorify Alexios I's reign. However, his work, beginning with events from 1070, was only completed up to 1079 due to his death. His wife, Anna Komnene (1083–1153/1155), continued his efforts after his death. Excluded from power by her brother and confined to a monastery, Anna devoted herself to cultural pursuits and writing a work celebrating her father's reign. This work, titled The Alexiad, is one of the greatest achievements of Byzantine historiography. In 15 books, Anna recounts her father's rise to power, the history of his reign, his wars, negotiations with neighboring states and crusaders, and the intrigues of the court.

A generation younger than Anna, John Kinnamos (after 1143–after 1195) served as a confidential secretary and close associate of Emperor Manuel I. His historical work, preserved as an abridged version titled Epitome, covers the reigns of John II and Manuel I Komnenos from 1118 to 1176.

The Komnenian era also saw the flourishing of high-quality chronicles with both historical and literary significance. Joannes Zonaras, a high-ranking imperial official under John II Komnenos who later became a monk, wrote a comprehensive chronicle titled Epitome of History around the mid-12th century. Spanning 18 books, it covers history from the creation of the world to the ascension of John II Komnenos. Zonaras' work holds considerable historical and literary value, serving as a fundamental textbook on universal history in Byzantium and enjoying immense popularity.

A generation younger, Constantine Manasses (d. 1187) authored an equally popular verse chronicle titled Synopsis of History, comprising 6,733 lines. Michael Glykas, another prominent chronicler, was a poet, theologian, and high-ranking imperial official who was imprisoned in a monastery for participating in a conspiracy. His chronicle, titled Book of History, lacks substantial historical value but includes numerous theological, natural, and military digressions, anecdotes, and curiosities, which made it widely read. Glykas also authored a theological work titled Collection of Proverbs, 90 Letters (mostly fictional), and Poems, considered the first poetic work written in Modern Greek.

== Theologians and philosophers ==
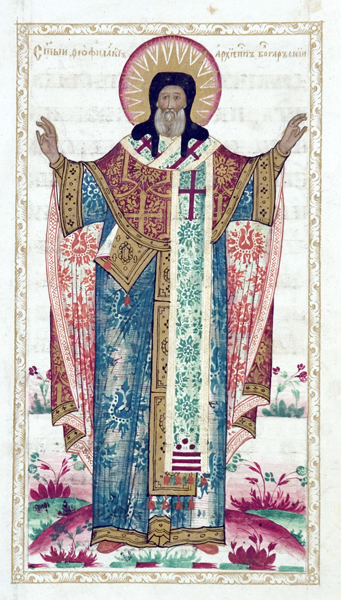
Theophylact of Ohrid

The theological literature of the turn of the 11th and 12th centuries was represented by Theophylact, Archbishop of Ohrid. Theophylact authored commentaries on the Book of Psalms, the Twelve Minor Prophets, the Gospels of Matthew and John, and the Pauline epistles. He also wrote polemical works Against the Latins and Against the Jews, a collection of homilies, and Letters to Friends. As a former tutor to the imperial prince, he penned a manual titled Imperial Education.

Euthymios Zigabenos, a Constantinopolitan monk, composed at the request of Emperor Alexios I an extensive work titled The Dogmatic Panoply of the Orthodox Faith. This text presented the Orthodox Church's doctrinal teachings and a survey of heresies from ancient times. Euthymius also wrote an exegetical commentary on the Psalms and several hagiographic homilies.

In the subsequent generation, influenced by Emperor Manuel I's policies and initiatives, Nicetas, Archbishop of Thessaloniki, wrote Six Dialogues aimed at reconciling the Eastern and Western churches. He also produced a commentary on the hymns of John of Damascus and a collection of 11 anathemas against John Italus.

Another eminent theologian of Manuel I's reign was Nicholas of Methone, a fervent opponent of contemporary heresies. In his Interpretation of Proclus' Doctrines, he countered the popular Neoplatonism among the educated elite. In Questions and Answers, he provided a detailed exposition of Orthodox teachings on the Incarnation. He contested the Bogomil monk Niphon's doctrines on the Eucharist and, in Concise Arguments, refuted the Latin teaching on the procession of the Holy Spirit. His Refutation of Arguments addressed Soterichos Panteugenos' doctrine on receiving the Eucharist.

Younger than Nicholas, Theorian authored two accounts of missions he undertook on Emperor Manuel I's behalf: one to Nerses IV, leader of the Armenian Apostolic Church, and another to Theodore, Catholicos of the Syrian Jacobites. Andronikos Kamateros wrote The Sacred Arsenal during Manuel's reign. This dialogue presented the emperor's debates first with the Latins on the procession of the Holy Spirit, and subsequently with the Monophysites and Monothelites.

Philosophical endeavors of this period focused on commenting on Aristotle's works. Michael of Ephesus, a student of Michael Psellos, wrote a commentary on Organon, while Eustratius, Patriarch of Nicaea, produced commentaries on Nicomachean Ethics and Posterior Analytics. Theodore of Smyrna, who succeeded Michael Psellos and John Italos as director of philosophical studies, wrote an unpublished work titled On Aristotle's Physics. Isaac Komnenos, brother of Emperor Alexios I, adapted Proclus' writings to align with Orthodox Christianity by substituting Christian terminology for pagan ones. Conversely, Nicholas of Methone opposed the Neoplatonist trend prevalent among the educated elite.

== Poets ==
Religious poetry, in decline since the early 11th century, completely disappeared during this period. Attempts to sustain it were made without much success by monks from the Territorial Abbacy of Saint Mary of Grottaferrata near Rome, including Saint Bartholomew, Arsenius, German, and Joseph. In contrast, secular poetry flourished remarkably.

The era of poetic revival began under Alexios I with the monk Philip Monotropos ("The Recluse"), who authored Laments and Sorrows, a 371-verse work later expanded over fourfold into a dialogue titled The Collection: A Dialogue Between Soul and Body. Nicholas Kallikles, the court physician to Alexios I, composed court epigrams, often in dialogue form. In the first half of the 12th century, Nicholas, Archbishop of Corfu, wrote a 310-verse poem titled On His Abdication.

Theodore Prodromos (known as "The Beggar" due to his perpetual poverty) was the most prominent poet of the 12th century. In his works, he frequently lamented his plight as a learned poet unable to support his wife and children. Drawing inspiration from classical literature, Prodromos authored major works such as the parody The War of the Cat and the Mouse, the dialogue Friendship in Exile, satires On a Lustful Old Woman and On an Old Bearded Man, the didactic poem Astrological Work, and Verses on the Twelve Months. His extensive collection of epigrams included courtly, occasional, religious, and less frequently, everyday and funerary themes. Prodromos also wrote satirical dialogues in prose inspired by Lucian of Samosata, including Amaranthos, or the Love of an Old Man, The Sale of the Lives of Poets and Commoners, and To Caesar Bryennios on the Color Green. Though primarily a classicist, Prodromos also wrote poetry in the vernacular, expressing his poverty and listing items he desired. His works contributed to the revival of the ancient Sophistic romance in Byzantium.

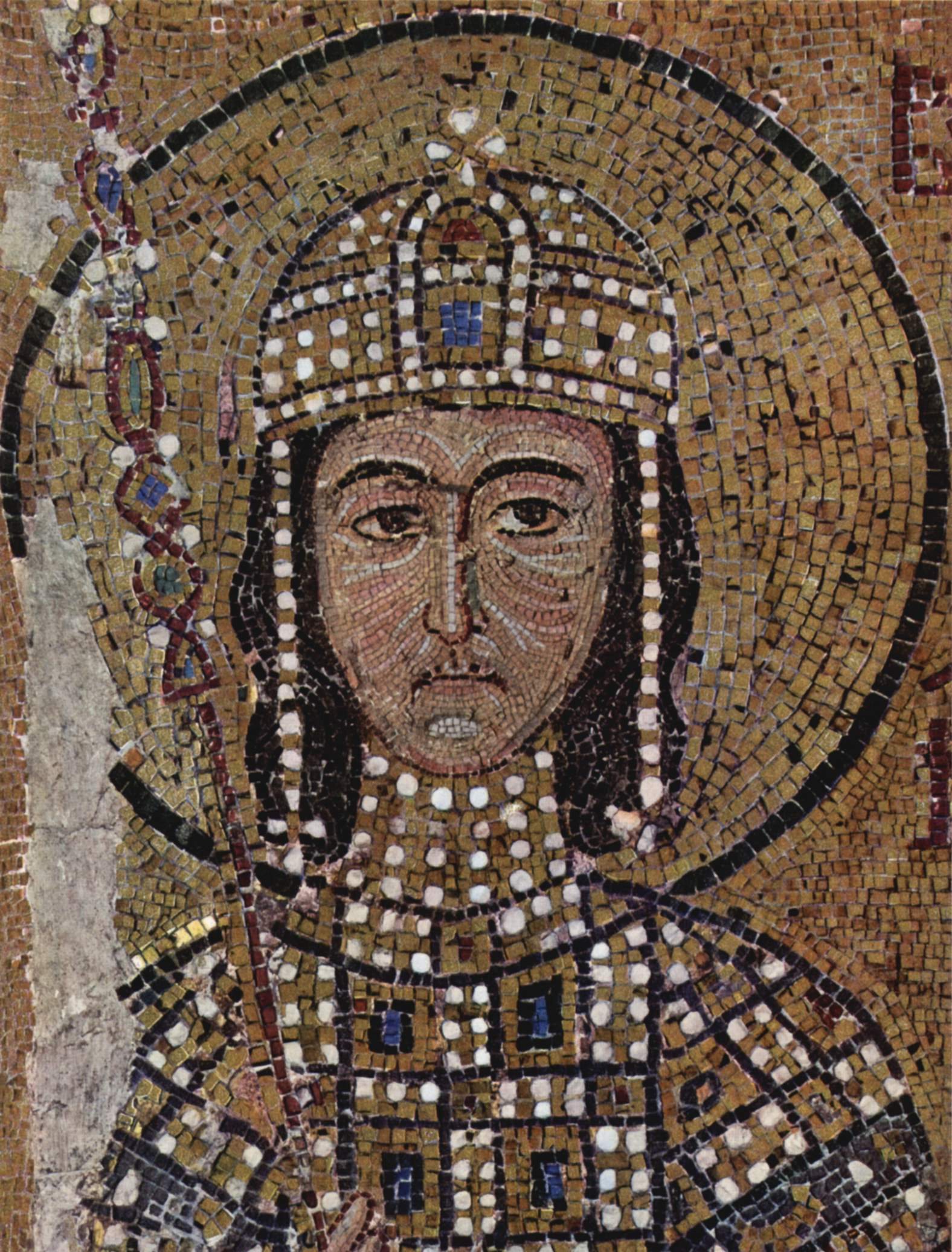
Alexios Komnenos, son of John II Komnenos. Mosaic, c. 1122, Hagia Sophia

John X of Constantinople, Bishop of Bulgaria and younger contemporary of Prodromos, composed a didactic poem titled Astrologica. Luke Chrysoberges, Patriarch of Constantinople, authored The Diet, which included recipes for preparing fasting dishes. At the end of the 12th century, Constantine Stilbes wrote Verses on the Fire under the influence of a great fire that struck Constantinople. His contemporary, Michael Haplouchir, lamented his poverty in a multi-character dialogue poem titled The Drama. Modern Greek began to gain more popularity during this time. Around the mid-12th century, Alexios, son of Emperor John II, composed a didactic poem in the demotic language titled The Young Man. A few years later, Michael Glykas, an imperial secretary, wrote Verses for the emperor in the straightforward and colorful language of the Byzantine streets.

== Verse and prose romance ==
Theodor Prodrom contributed to the revival of the ancient sophistic romance, which flourished between the 1st and 3rd century, with his work Rhodanthe and Dosicles. Prodrom gave it an erudite character while drawing on motifs from Eastern literatures. In his romance, Dosicles abducts the beautiful Rhodanthe, but both are captured by pirates. Rhodanthe is sold into slavery, and Dosicles is to be sacrificed to the gods, but everything ultimately ends happily with the lovers' wedding.

Following Prodrom in the first half of the 12th century, Nicetas Eugenian authored The Adventures of Drosilla and Charicles, a work distinguished by its delicate eroticism, though not devoid of Aristophanic liberty. Based on an Indian tale, the anonymous The Fortunes of Poor Leon tells the story of a sage who, after losing his fortune, is sold into slavery and, through wise counsel offered to his master, regains his wealth.

Alongside verse romances, prose romances influenced by Persian, Arabic, and Indian literature also flourished in Byzantium. The chartophylax Eustathios Makrembolites wrote the extensive romance The Adventures of Hysmine and Hysminias, in which the protagonists, after dramatic trials, are united in marriage. At the end of the 11th century, The Enchanting Tale of the Philosopher Syntipas emerged. In this story, a stepson falsely accused by his stepmother must remain completely silent for seven days, during which seven sages assist him by narrating tales to the king about the deceitfulness of women to save the youth. From the same period comes Stephanites and Ichnelates, an Indian romance translated from Arabic about two jackals who, in human guise, exemplify for a ruler how to govern his subjects wisely.

== Drama and satire ==
From the time of Alexios I comes Christos Paschon, the only Byzantine drama. In this work, intended for reading rather than performance, the characters include the Virgin Mary, modeled on Euripidean heroines, along with Christ, Saint John, Saint Joseph, and two semi-choruses of Galilean women.

12th-century classicism also revived the works of Lucian of Samosata. In the mid-12th century, besides Prodrom, an anonymous author emulated Lucian in the work Timarion. In this piece, after a grand festival in Thessaloniki, Timarion dies and journeys to the underworld, where he encounters Emperor Romanos IV Diogenes and philosophers such as Diogenes, Michael Psellos, John Italus, Pythagoras, and others. Ultimately, Timarion is sentenced by the underworld court to return to the land of the living.

== Philologists and rhetoricians ==
The most prominent philologist of this period was Eustathius, Bishop of Thessalonica, known for his Commentary on Homer's Iliad and Commentary on Homer's Odyssey. Between 1170 and 1175, he produced a paraphrase and scholia on the geographical epic of Dionysius Periegetes. He also wrote a commentary on Pindar. As Bishop of Thessalonica, Eustathius witnessed the Norman capture of the city, which he recounted in On the Capture of Thessalonica. Additionally, he authored significant works on church life, such as On Monastic Life and On Hypocrisy, along with numerous letters, homilies, ascetic writings, and encomia dedicated to saints.

Eustathius' student, Michael Choniates, Bishop of Athens, left behind a collection of rhetorical letters and occasional speeches, including funeral and lamentation orations. He also wrote poems and the poem Teano. Another notable figure, Michael Italicus, was more of a rhetorician than a philologist, known for his speeches and letters.

The imperial secretary, John Tzetzes (c. 1110–1186), authored a 12,764-line historical-literary poem titled The Chiliads. He also wrote Allegories on Homer's Iliad and Odyssey, Pre-Homeric, Homeric, and Post-Homeric Events, the interpretative poem Theogony, commentaries on Hesiod's Works and Days and Shield, three comedies by Aristophanes, Porphyry's Isagoge, and Aristotle's Categories. His other works include literary studies such as On Versification and On Tragic Poetry.

In the 11th century, numerous anonymous philological works were also produced, including dictionaries for Iliad and Odyssey, selected dialogues of Plato, and Herodotus' Histories. Other notable works include anti-Atticist, syntactic, rhetorical dictionaries, and A Collection of Useful Words. The era's etymological dictionaries are epitomized by the Great Etymological Dictionary, with smaller works such as Etymologicum Gudianum, Etymologicum Angelicanum, and Etymologicum Florentinum also holding importance.

== Physicians ==
The medicine of the Komnenian era drew heavily from the achievements of previous centuries. The physician Damnates authored A Treatise on Pregnancy and Embryos, while John, Bishop of Pryzdiana, wrote Digressions Taken from Ancient Physicians. At the court of Alexios I, Nicholas Kallikles and Michael Pantechnes were also active, though their writings have not survived.

== Bibliography ==
- Jurewicz, Oktawiusz (1984). Historia literatury bizantyńskiej [The History of Byzantine Literature] (in Polish). Wrocław: Ossolineum. ISBN 83-04-01422-X.
