= Timarion =

The Timarion (Greek: Τιμαρίων) is a Byzantine pseudo-Lucianic satirical dialogue probably composed in the twelfth century (there are references to the eleventh-century Michael Psellus), though possibly later.

The eponymous hero, on his way to a Christian fair at Thessalonica, is unexpectedly taken to Hades, which is ruled by pagan figures and pagan justice (including the emperor Theophilos as a judge), and where "Galilæans" (that is, Christians) make up only one sect (αἵρεσις) of many.

In one scene, a eunuch whose face "shines like the sun" whispers in Timarion's ear. His companion Theodore says it's his guardian angel.

== Edition and translation ==
- R. Romano, "Pseudo-Luciano, Timarione", in Byzantina et neo-hellenica neapolitana 2. Naples: Università di Napoli. Cattedra di filologia bizantina, 1974; pp. 49-92.
- B. Baldwin, Timarion, Translated with Introduction and Commentary. Detroit: Wayne State University Press, 1984.
- Anonim Bir Bizans Hicvi Timarion, çev: Engin ÖZTÜRK, İstanbul: Urzeni Yayınları, 2020.

== See also ==
- The Menippus or Necyomantia by Lucian
- Mazaris' Journey to Hades (late Byzantine)
