= Barry Baldwin =

Classicist, journalist and author

Barry Baldwin (born in England in 1937) is a classicist, journalist and author of mystery fiction. He gained a doctorate at the University of Nottingham and worked in Australia and Canada. For two years he contributed a regular column to the British Communist newspaper The Morning Star. He is now a Fellow of the Royal Society of Canada and Emeritus Professor of Classics at the University of Calgary. Barry Baldwin is best known in his academic field for his work on early Greek humorists and satirists, notably on the Philogelos, on Lucian, and on the Byzantine satire Timarion. He is a regular columnist for Fortean Times magazine.

== Selected works ==
=== Books ===
- Studies in Lucian. Toronto: Hakkert, 1973.
- The Roman Emperors. Montreal: Harvest House, 1980.
- Suetonius: Biographer of the Caesars. Amsterdam: A. M. Hakkert, 1983.
- Philogelos or Laughter-Lover: an ancient jokebook translated. Amsterdam: J. C. Gieben, 1983.
- Timarion. Detroit: Wayne State University Press, 1984.
- Studies on Late Roman and Byzantine History, Literature and Language. Amsterdam: J.C. Gieben, 1984.
- An Anthology of Byzantine Poetry (ed.). Amsterdam: J.C. Gieben, 1985.
- Studies in Greek and Roman History and Literature. Amsterdam: J.C. Gieben, 1985.
- An Anthology of Later Latin Literature (ed.). Amsterdam: J.C. Gieben, 1987.
- Roman and Byzantine Papers. Amsterdam: J.C. Gieben, 1989.
- The Latin & Greek Poems of Samuel Johnson. London: Duckworth, 1995.

=== Articles ===
- "Living Latin at the Vatican" (review of Lexicon Recentis Latinitatis) in Catholic Insight (October 2003)
- "Ancient Science Fiction" at Shattercolors.com
