= Eustathios Makrembolites =

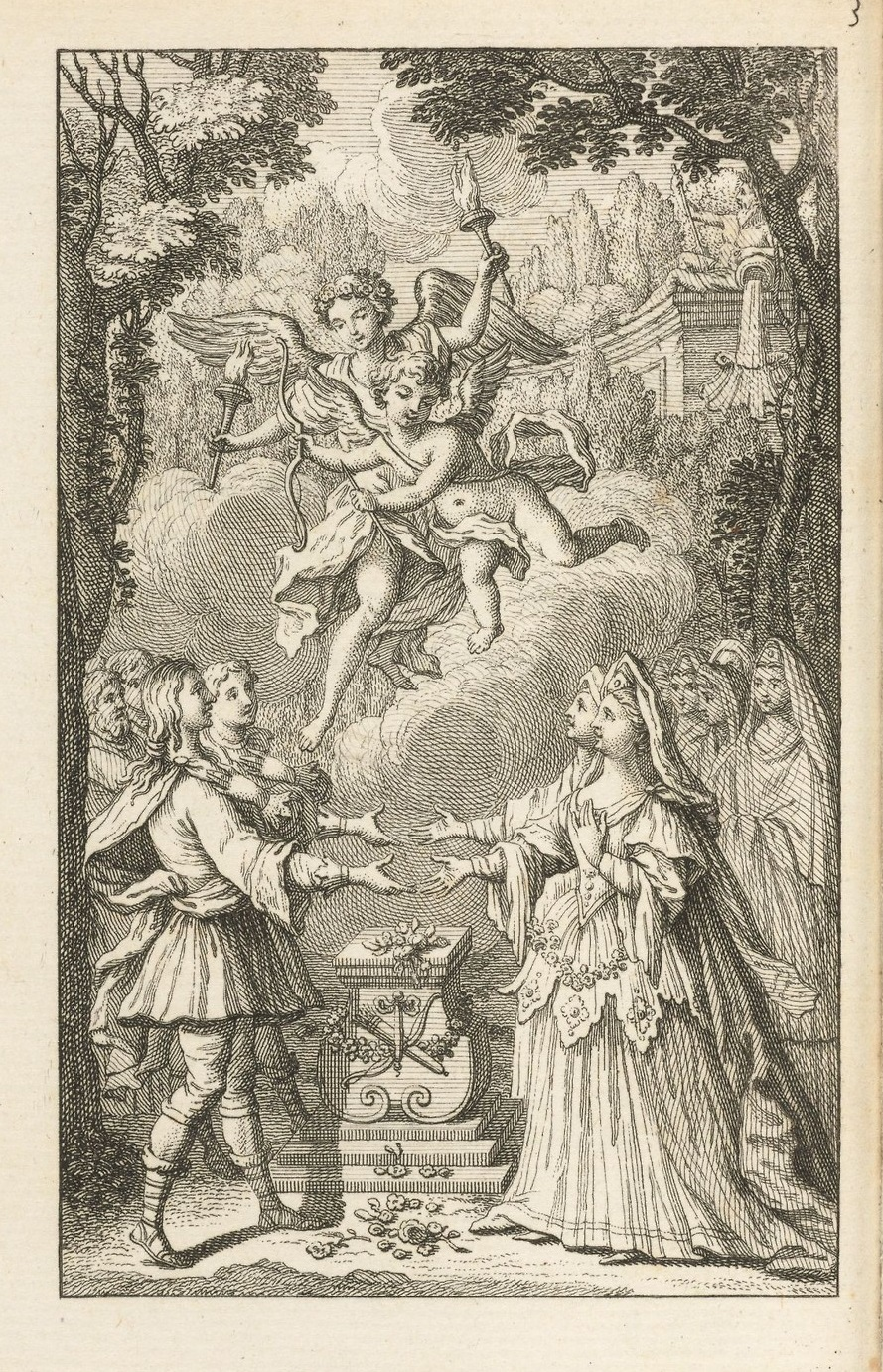
Cover of Les amours d’Ismene et d’Ismenias, a 1743 translation into French of Hysimine and Hysimines(12th century)

Eustathios Makrembolites (Greek: Εὐστάθιος Μακρεμβολίτης; fl. c. 1150–1200), Latinized as Eustathius Macrembolites, was a Byzantine revivalist of the ancient Greek romance, who flourished in the second half of the 12th century CE. He is sometimes identified as the contemporary Eparch of the City Eumathios Makrembolites (Greek: Εὐμάθιος Μακρεμβολίτης).

His title Protonobilissimus shows him to have been a person of distinction and, if he is also correctly described in the manuscripts as chief keeper of the ecclesiastical archives, he must have been a Christian. He was the author of a Byzantine novel, The Story of Hysmine and Hysminias, in eleven books. Although he borrowed from Homer and other Attic poets, the chief source of his phraseology was the rhetorician Choricius of Gaza. The style is remarkable for the absence of hiatus and a laboured use of antithesis. The digressions on works of art, apparently the result of personal observation, are considered by some scholars the best part of the work. The novel enjoyed a later influence in connection with the story tradition of Apollonius of Tyre—Eustathius' scene of the storm at sea and the heroine offered as a sacrifice being adapted in Book 8 of the Confessio Amantis of John Gower and, by way of that, forming a portion of the plot of William Shakespeare's Pericles, Prince of Tyre (particularly in Act III).

A collection of eleven Riddles, of which solutions were written by the grammarian Manuel Holobolos, is also attributed to Eustathius.

== Editions ==
- Isidor Hilberg (1876), edition of both romance and riddles, with critical apparatus and prolegomena, including the solutions. He fixes the date of Eustathius between 850 and 988.
- M. Treu (1893), edition of the Riddles alone.
- Four Byzantine Novels, translated with introductions and notes by Elizabeth Jeffreys, Liverpool University Press, 2012. Includes English translation of Hysmine and Hyminias.
