= An Entertaining Tale of Quadrupeds =

14th century Greek poem

An Entertaining Tale of Quadrupeds (Medieval Greek: Παιδιόφραστος διήγησις τῶν ζῴων τῶν τετραπόδων) is a Byzantine poem composed in the 14th century AD by an unknown author. It is notable for its cross-genre literary style, encompassing satire, didactic and romance (see Byzantine literature). The text takes the form of a dialogue between different domestic and wild animals, in a convention presided over by the King of the animals, the Lion.

== Dating ==
The poem itself states that it was written on 15 September 1364. Modern commentators have generally accepted that the poem was written within 10–20 years either side of this date. It was probably written before 1382, as a specific kind of hat (Greek: σαρπούζιν; Arabic: sharbūsh) worn by Muslims in Mamluk Egypt was banned that year. The style and vigour of the text also suggest that the poem was written before the forced vassalage of the remaining Byzantine Empire to the Ottoman Empire.

== Author ==
=== Name ===
The author of the poem is unknown. The first verses of the Greek version form the acrostic 'ΔΙΟΓΕΝΟΥΣΘΕ' ('Diogenousthe'), which could suggest the author's name was Diogenes/Digines (Greek: Διογένης). The name is otherwise unknown in this context, and therefore the author's identity remains a mystery.

=== Social position ===
There are some indications in the text about the social position of the author in his 14th-century context. Much like the majority of literate persons in the Byzantine Empire at this time, the author was probably associated with the Byzantine Church, possibly a monk, scribe or secretary. This is supported by several clues in the poem. Firstly, the text ends with a reference to Psalm 33.16. Secondly, the author displays anti-Catholicism and anti-Semitism, characteristic of Byzantine clergy at this time. There are no allusions to personal relationships and marriage, though references to genitalia are plentiful.

== Style ==
The text is in the form of a poem. The meter is composed of 15 syllables. Each section is separated by a Caesura between the 8th and 9th syllable. There are a total of 1082 verses and 36 stanzas.

=== Genre ===
The genre of the Tale is not clearly defined. There are features of Allegory, Bestiary, Fable/Beast fable and Epic poetry.

==== Allegory ====
The central allegory of the Tale is the depiction of Animal society, with its various characters and traits, as an allusion to contemporary Byzantine society. Many of the characters could fulfill numerous positions in Byzantine society: the Lion, a figure of supreme importance and power (Emperor, Patriarch of Constantinople, Pope); the Fox, a wily trickster (Court eunuch); the Elephant, a redundant giant (Co-Emperor).

==== Fable/Beast Fable ====
See: Beast fable

==== Bestiary ====
The Tale plausibly falls into the category of Bestiary. It lists many animals, both domestic and wild, among its protagonists: Lion, Elephant, Bear, Boar, Deer, Donkey, Horse, Wolf, Cheetah, Leopard, Dog, Fox, Hound, Ox, Buffalo, Hare, Goat, Nanny (female Goat), Ewe (female Sheep), Camel, Cat, Rat, Monkey, Sheep. Notably, neither birds nor insects feature in the entire story.

==== Epic poetry ====
Some aspects of the Tale are similar to the epic poetry, such as the Iliad and the Epic of Gilgamesh. Principally, the focal point and climax of the story is a battle between the two sides in the story. Alongside this, the fighting focuses on hand-to-hand combat:

Καὶ χύνει χοῖρος ἀπεκεῖ ἁψὺς καὶ κατεβαίνει, (1053)
κρούει τὸν λεοντόπαρδον καὶ ἐξεκοιλίασέν τον.
Εὐθυς δὲ ἐχαμόδραμεν ἡ ἄκρος πρὸς τὸν χοῖρον·
οὗτος γυρίζεται γοργόν καὶ κρούει καὶ τὴν ἄκρον·
ἐσκότωσε δὲ καὶ αὐτὴν μετὰ λεοντοπάδρου.

The boar rushed down there briskly, like a torrent,
striking and disemboweling the leopard
At once the bear crawled over to the boar,
who swiftly turned around and struck her, too,
slaughtering thus the bear just like the leopard.

=== Language ===
The Tale is written in Greek. The style of the language suggests that it was written down, as opposed to being recorded from an oral sources. The Tale is immediately remarkable for its use of profane language.

==== Koine and 'Atticising' Greek ====
Much in line with contemporary Byzantine literature, the Greek is a mixture of Koine, with close links to the spoken language of the day, and Attic Greek, a language of prestige and learning.

==== Loan-words ====
The two sources of loan-words in the Tale come from the East and the West.

== Themes ==
There are several themes present in the text. These include the reversal of the established order, comedy, and loyalty to the church and loyalty to the state.
