= Trajan the Patrician =

Trajan the Patrician (Greek: Τραϊανός Πατρίκιος, Traianos Patrikios; Latin: Traianus Patricius) was a Byzantine historian.

According to the 10th-century Suda lexicon, a patrician Trajan flourished under emperor Justinian II (r. 685–695, 705–711). Trajan wrote a chronicle, which was "very admirable" (Suda T 901). The Suda describes him as "a most faithful Christian and most Orthodox". The chronicle is commonly believed to have covered the period from the late 7th century (likely 668) to ca. 713 or 720, and was probably used by Theophanes the Confessor and Patriarch Nikephoros I of Constantinople as a common source for their own chronicles.
