= Hillberg =

Hillberg is a surname. Notable people with the surname include:

- Antonia Hillberg (born 1997), German politician
- Linnéa Hillberg (1892–1977), Swedish actress
- Robert Hillberg (1917–2012), American firearms designer

== Aviation ==
- Hillberg Helicopters, an American aircraft manufacturer based in Fountain Valley, California

== Weapons ==
- Hillberg Carbine, a light rifle concept for the US armed forces during WW2

== See also ==
- Hilberg
