= Antonia Hillberg =

German politician (born 1997)

Member of the Landtag of Lower Saxony
- Incumbent
- Assumed office 8 November 2022

Personal details
- Born: 14 December 1997 (age 28)
- Party: Social Democratic Party (since 2013)

Antonia Hillberg (born 14 December 1997) is a German politician serving as a member of the Landtag of Lower Saxony since 2022. She has been a member of the Social Democratic Party since 2013.
