= Isidor Hilberg =

Austro-Hungarian scholar (1852-1919)

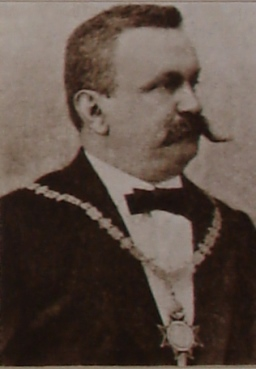
Isidor Hilberg, wearing his Rector's insignia (1897/98)

Isidor Hilberg (May 28, 1852, at Byelaya Tzerkov, Russian Empire – October 28, 1919, in Vienna), was a classical scholar in Austria-Hungary.

In 1856 he went with his parents to Vienna, where he received his early education. Subsequently he studied classical philology at the University of Vienna under Vahlen, Gomperz, Emanuel Hoffmann, and Hartel (Ph.D. 1874). In 1875, he studied for half a year in Italy, and became privatdozent in classical philology at the University of Vienna in 1877. In 1879 he was appointed assistant professor at Prague University, and in 1882 professor at the University of Czernowitz, of which he was "Rector Magnificus" in 1898. He is now best known for his three-volume edition of the letters of St. Jerome in the Corpus Scriptorum Ecclesiasticorum Latinorum.

== Works ==
- "Eustathii Macrembolitæ Protonobilissimi de Hysmines et Hysminiæ Amoribus Libri xi." Vienna, 1876.
- "Epistula Critica ad Joannem Vahlenum de Nonnullis Scriptorum Græcorum et Romanorum Locis Emendandis Explicandisve," Vienna, 1877.
- "Das Gesetz der trochäischen Wortformen im Dactylischen, Hexameter und Pentameter der Griechen vom 7. Jahrh. v. Chr. bis zum Untergang der Griechischen Poesie," Vienna, 1878.
- "Das Princip der Silbenwägung und die daraus entspringenden Gesetze der Endsilben in der griechischen Poesie," Vienna, 1879.
- "Die Gesetze der Wortstellung im Pentameter des Ovid," Leipzig, 1894.
- "Philologie und Naturwissenschaft" (his discourse when appointed rector) Czernowitz, 1898.
- "Ist die Ilias Latina von einem Italicus verfasst oder einem Italicus gewidmet?" Wiener Studien, 21, 264–305, 1899. (An article arguing against the existence of acrostics in Latin literature.)
- (ed.) "Sancti Eusebii Hieronymi Epistulae," Corpus Scriptorum Ecclesiasticorum Latinorum, 54–56. Vienna, 1910-1918.
