= Mazaris =

Mazaris (Greek: Μάζαρις; fl. c. 1415) was a late Byzantine Greek writer known only for having authored a satirical text entitled "Mazaris' Journey to Hades". Although his identity and first name are unknown, Mazaris has been tentatively identified with at least two known historical personalities of the same name, one Manuel Mazaris, who was a hymnographer and served as protonotarios of Thessaloniki, and one Maximus Mazaris, who was a monk and author of a text on grammatical rules. According to yet another hypothesis however, these two were actually the same person. Because of this uncertainty, the author of the work is mostly referred to simply by his family name.

The Journey to Hades is believed to have been written between January 1414 and October 1415. It contains elements of social satire targeting the Byzantine ruling elite, but also contains some information about the lower classes in the Peloponnese, including some remarks about the various ethnic groups that made up its population.
