= Byzantine literature of the Laskaris and Palaiologos periods =

Final period of Byzantine literature, from 1204 to 1453

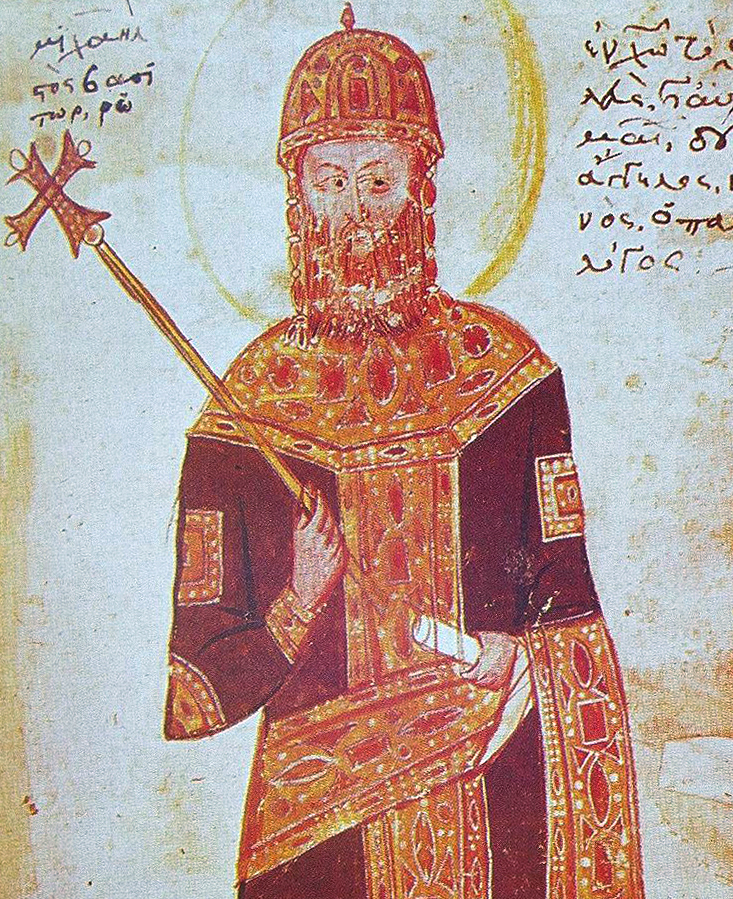
Michael VIII Palaiologos, the first ruler of the Palaiologos dynasty

Byzantine literature of the Laskaris and Palaiologos periods was the final period of Byzantine literature, from the conquest of Constantinople by the Crusaders in 1204 to the fall of Constantinople in 1453.

After the Crusader conquest of Constantinople in 1204, in the following years, the Byzantine state was revived in Anatolia with its center in Nicaea. The years of the Nicaean Empire were primarily a period of collecting the dispersed legacy. The most prominent authors of this period include the historian and theologian Niketas Choniates and the polymath Nikephoros Blemmydes.

In the final decades of the Byzantine Empire, local centers gained importance as the capital weakened. On Rhodes, Emanuel Georgilas Limenites created, and the Rhodesian Love Songs were composed. From Crete came the Notes and Stanzas of Stephanos Sahlikis. In Mystras, at the court of the Despotate of the Morea, Mazaris wrote his satire, and the philosopher Gemistos Plethon, a proponent of Neoplatonism and pagan Hellenism, influenced Renaissance Italy. His students, Bessarion and John Argyropoulos, defended Plato in Italy, while Gennadius Scholarius and George of Trebizond critiqued Plethon.

The turn of the 14th and 15th centuries saw the last romances inspired by French models, such as Floris and Blanchefleur and Imberios and Margaron. At the same time, there was a shift to Greek themes, with Emanuel Georgilas Limenites' Historical Tale of Belisarius and the widely popular Tale of the Suffering Apollonius of Tyre. Historians such as George Sphrantzes and Laonikos Chalkokondyles wrote from differing perspectives, with the last significant historian, Michael Critobulus, documenting Sultan Mehmed II's reign. Several works remain about the struggles with the Turks, including The Tale of the Siege of Constantinople and The Conquest of Constantinople, likely by Emanuel Limenites.

== Nicaean period ==
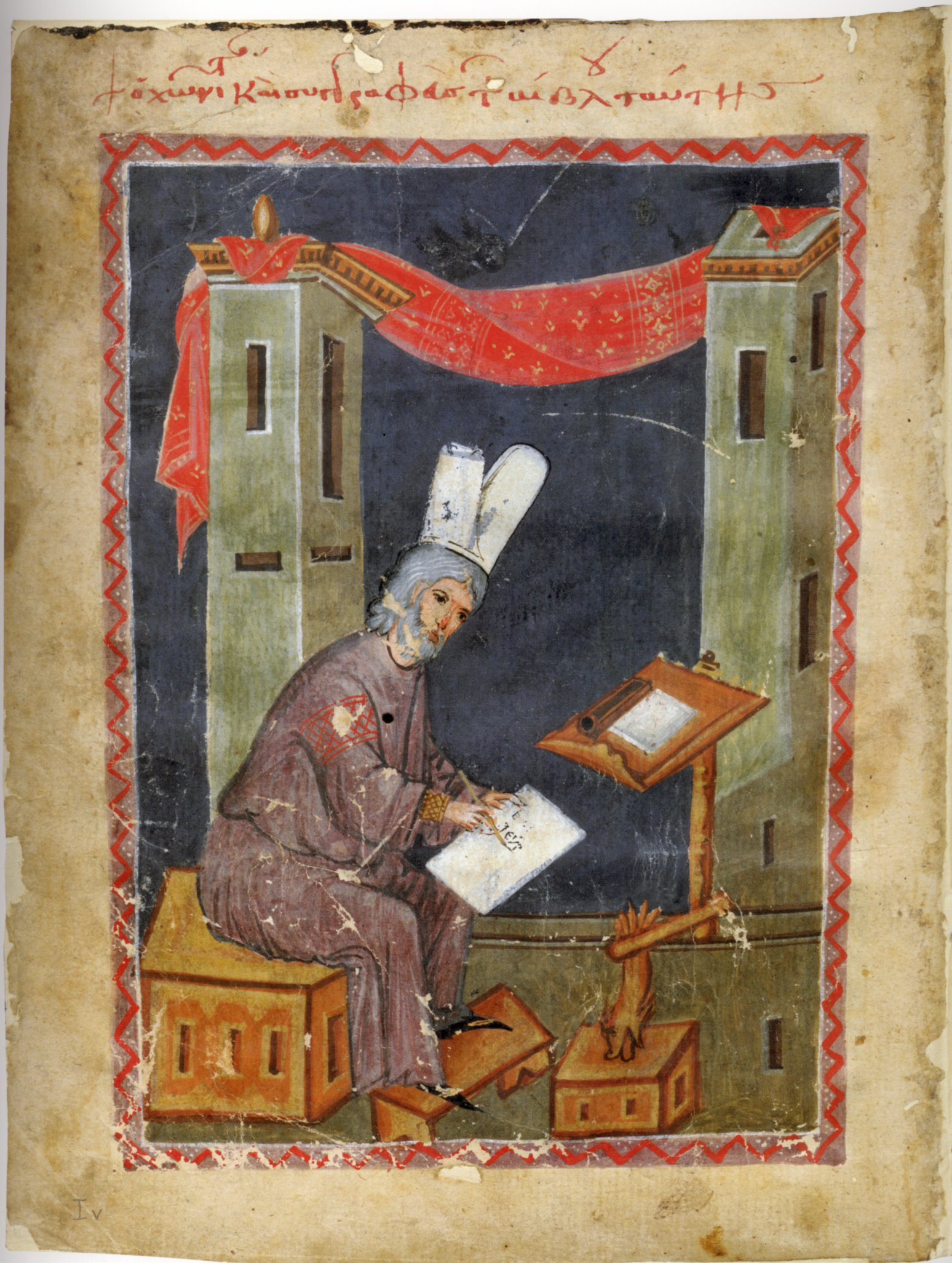
Niketas Choniates

After the conquest of Constantinople in April 1204, the Byzantine Empire was revived in Anatolia. The new Laskaris dynasty chose Nicaea as the capital of their state. From the captured Constantinople, Niketas Choniates (c. 1155 – c. 1215) fled to Nicaea with the first version of his History, covering the history of the empire from 1118 to 1204. In Nicaea, he finalized and expanded the work, bringing it up to 1206, the second year of the reign of Henry of Flanders. At the court of Theodore I Laskaris, the writer began working on his second major work, The Treasury of Orthodoxy, in 25 books, addressing heresies and doctrinal errors in the church. Niketas also wrote many occasional speeches and a poetic work about the marriage of Isaac Angelos to Margaret, daughter of Hungarian King Bela III.

During the reign of Emperor John III Doukas Vatatzes (1222–1254), Nikephoros Blemmydes (1197–c. 1272) was active in the Nicaean Empire. After studying philosophy, theology, and medicine, he sought manuscripts for the library established by the emperor in Nicaea. He was the teacher of future Emperor Theodore II Laskaris. Blemmydes was interested in various fields of human knowledge. His most famous philosophical works include A Manual of Logic and Physics and Treatise on the Duties of the Ruler (Lògos), dedicated to the emperor. In connection with the emperor's efforts to achieve a church union, he wrote a comprehensive two-volume work on the origin of the Holy Spirit (the first book titled Evidence, and the second Dogmatic Dispute). He also wrote numerous smaller theological treatises, commentaries on the Psalms, a Geographical Outline, two autobiographies, and numerous poems on state and religious themes.

Among the Byzantine writers of this period, a significant place is held by Theodore II Laskaris, a student of Blemmydes and emperor (1254–1258). He authored a philosophical work, On the Unity of Nature, in which he demonstrated the unity of nature despite the contradictions and opposites within it, and Christian Theology, a work in 8 books dealing with God, the Holy Trinity, and the origin of the Holy Spirit. In On the Origin of the Holy Spirit, directed against the Latins, Theodore II debated his teacher. He also wrote numerous homilies, speeches, ascetic writings, prayers, and canons.

== Renaissance of the Palaiologians ==
=== Union dispute ===
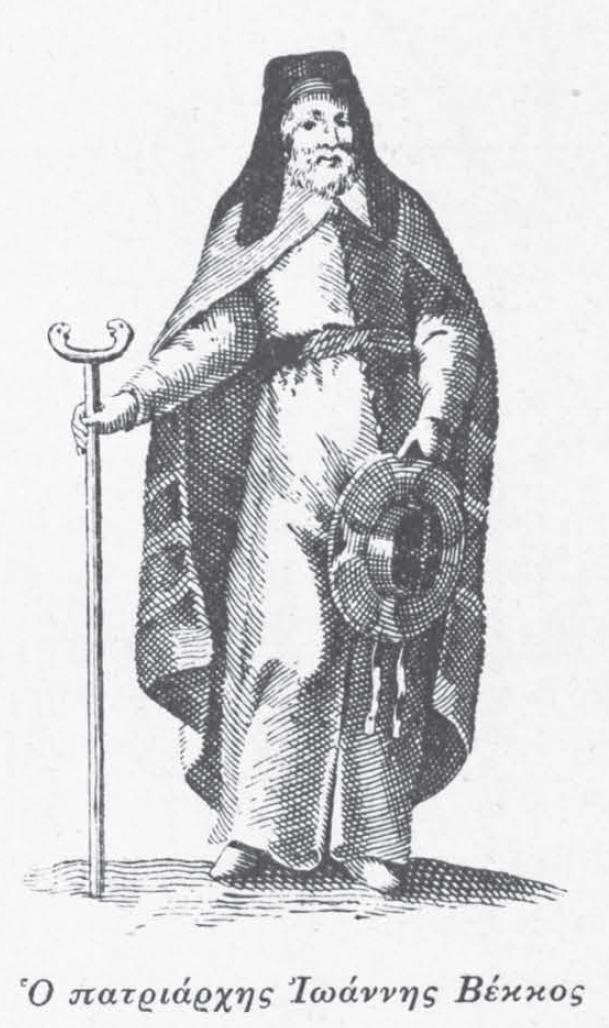
John XI of Constantinople

In 1261, Emperor Michael VIII Palaiologos recaptured Constantinople. In response to the attempt by his opponents to rebuild the Latin Empire, one of his political priorities became the establishment of a church union with Rome, which was finally achieved at the Second Council of Lyon in 1274. The chief theoretician of the union during Michael VIII's reign was Patriarch John XI of Constantinople (c. 1225–1297), the author of On the Unity and Peace of the Churches of Old and New Rome, in which he argued that the Greek Fathers of the church acknowledged the origin of the Holy Spirit also from the Son (Filioque). John XI is also the author of a Collection of Quotations from the Fathers of the Church indicating that the Holy Spirit proceeds from the Son.

In 1282, after the death of Michael VIII, John XI was imprisoned. The new Patriarch of Constantinople, Gregory II (c. 1241–1290), opposed his views and wrote The Book of Faith. In defense of the union, those imprisoned with John XI, including Constantine Meliteniotes (d. 1307) in On the Origin of the Holy Spirit and George Metochites (d. 1328) in The Treatise, wrote works supporting the union.

=== Historians and polymaths ===
The work of Choniates was continued after the recapture of Constantinople by George Akropolites (1217–1282), a scholar, ambassador, and chief logothete, who led the Byzantine delegation at the Council of Lyon. In his major work, History of Contemporary Events, Akropolites described events from 1203 to 1261, focusing on the histories of the Nicaean and Latin empires. His contemporary, Theodore Skoutariotes, metropolitan of Cyzicus, wrote a Review of History, a chronicle of humanity from the creation of the world to the restoration of the Byzantine Empire in 1261. At the turn of the 13th and 14th centuries, Ephraim of Ainos wrote a poetic chronicle covering Roman emperors from Caligula (37 AD) to Michael VIII Palaiologos (1282).

During the reign of Andronikos II Palaiologos, George Pachymeres (1243–c. 1310), a pupil of Akropolites, polymath, and high-ranking imperial official, wrote History of Contemporary Events, a 13-book historical work covering years from 1260 to 1308. In his work, Pachymeres dedicated considerable space to theological and doctrinal disputes, particularly the 1274 union of Lyon. He also wrote Quadrivium on the Byzantine education system, a treatise on Aristotelian philosophy, a paraphrase of the letters of Pseudo-Dionysius the Areopagite, as well as Life of Manuel Holobolos, rhetorical works, and 13 political speeches.

A great scholar of the later period of Andronikos II's reign was Theodore Metochites (1270–1332), the son of George Metochites and grand logothete from 1321 to 1328. His major work, Various Writings, consists of 120 treatises on philosophy, history, and literary history. He also left behind 20 poetic works, hagiographical pieces, a Collection of Commentaries on Aristotle gathered from various philosophical textbooks, and a Foundation of Astronomy.

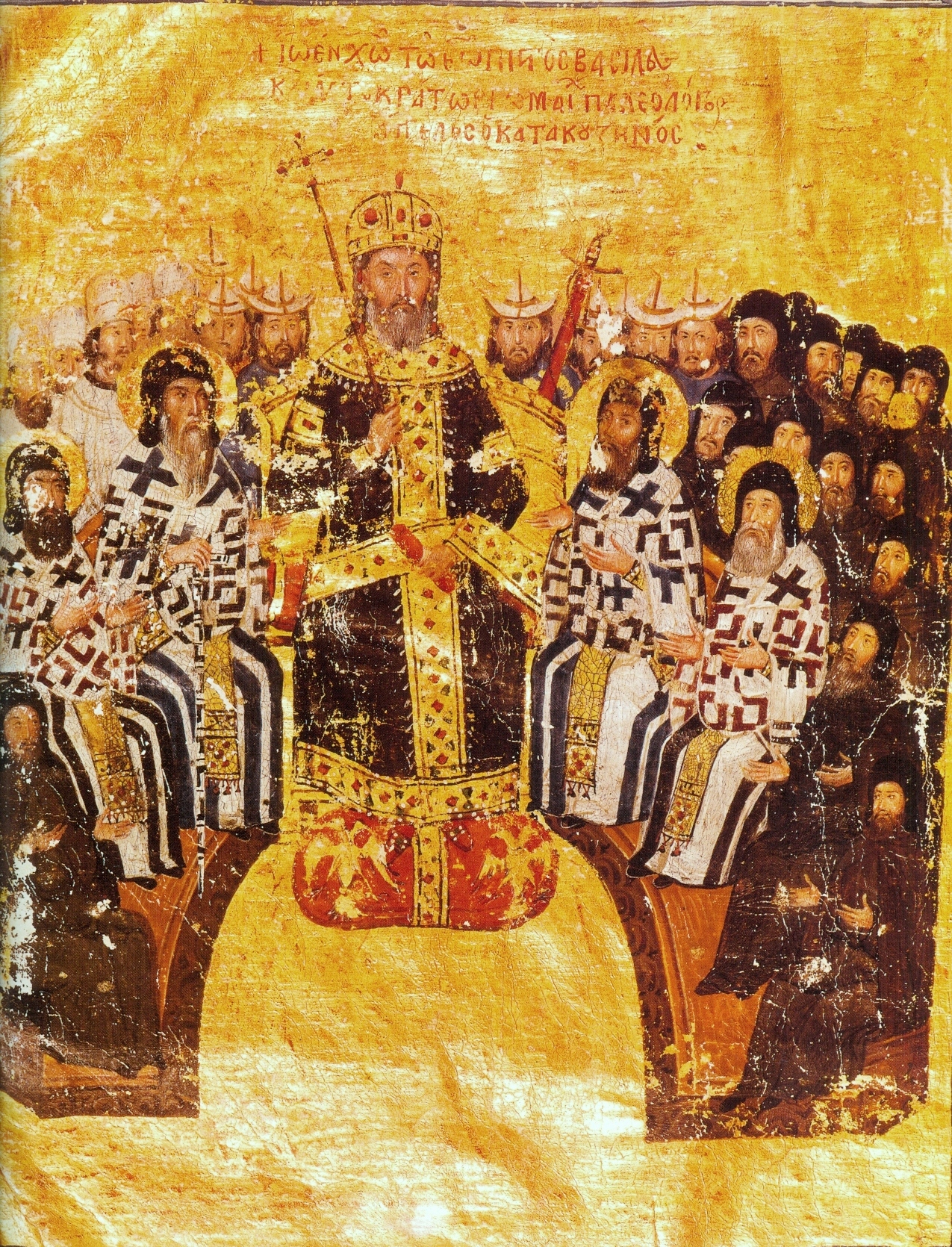
John VI Kantakouzenos

A student of Theodore Metochites, another Byzantine polymath, Nicephorus Gregoras (1295–1359/1360), served as chartophylax and imperial envoy during Andronikos II's reign and later became a monk. His most famous work is Roman History, a 37-book account covering the period from 1204 to 1359. Gregoras continues and supplements the works of his predecessors, George Akropolites and George Pachymeres, presenting a memoir with philosophical commentary detailing events from 1320 onwards. In addition to history, Gregoras was involved in theology, supporting the church union and opposing Hesychasm. His philological works include Grammatical Exercises, On Orthography, and a Commentary on the Odyssey. He also wrote two astronomical works: Encouragement for Astronomy and Against the Enemies of Astronomy.

The last major historian of this period was John VI Kantakouzenos, emperor from 1347 to 1354. After abdicating and entering a monastery, he wrote History of the Years 1320–1356, a 4-book memoir based on his own notes, archival documents, and letters, defending his reign.

=== Planudes and the philologists ===
Among the notable Byzantine writers of this period, a special role was played by Maximus Planudes (c. 1255–c. 1305), who served as secretary and envoy for Emperor Andronikos II. In 1285, Planudes became a monk and founded a monastery for laypeople and a school near the imperial library in Constantinople, where he engaged in extensive philological work. He made the works of ancient Greek authors widely accessible to his contemporaries. He edited the tragedies of Sophocles and Euripides, Moralia and Lives by Plutarch, and the Odes of Pindar. Additionally, he published Aristophanes' Plutus with commentary, Thucydides' Peloponnesian War, Hesiod's Works and Days, and commented on Theocritus' Idylls, Hermogenes' Art of Rhetoric, and Aesop's Life, appending a collection of Aesopian fables. Planudes also compiled an anthology of excerpts from ancient philosophers, historians, and geographers, a collection of epic poetry, popular proverbs, and an anthology of various epigrams. His Greek Anthology remained the only known collection of Greek epigrammatic poetry in Europe until 1606. He rediscovered and translated Ptolemy's Geography, edited Diophantus' Arithmetic, and expanded Byzantine culture by introducing several Latin works. Planudes translated The Distichs of Cato, Cicero's Dream of Scipio, Julius Caesar's Gallic Wars, Ovid's writings, Juvenal's Satires, Aelius Donatus' Ars Minor, Boethius' The Consolation of Philosophy, and Augustine's On the Trinity. His translations became a basis for learning Greek in the West. Additionally, he authored a Greek grammar and syntax textbook, Grammar.

Planudes' work was carried forward by his students and successors in the next generation. Manuel Moschopoulos (born c. 1265), a student and friend of Planudes, authored Questions on Grammar, a popular textbook for Renaissance humanists, complemented by Exercises. He edited Pindar's Odes and produced concise commentaries on Hesiod's poetry, the first two books of the Iliad, Euripides' tragedies, Theocritus' Idylls, and Aristophanes' comedies. Thomas Magister (c. 1275–1346), a friend of Moschopoulos, created a Lexicon of Nouns and Verbs and published Sophocles' Triad with commentary, along with triads of Euripides and Aeschylus. Demetrius Triclinius (c. 1280–c. 1340) edited Pindar's Olympian Odes with corrections and commentary and annotated five of Aeschylus' tragedies, Sophocles' tragedies, Aristophanes' comedies, and Theocritus' Idylls. Between 1316 and 1320, he also commented on Hesiod's poetry.

Other notable figures include John Pediasimos, who commented on Hesiod's Shield and Theogony, Theocritus' Syrinx, and Aristotle's works. Another significant contributor was Andrew Lopadios, a student and friend of Moschopoulos, who authored the Vienna Lexicon. Patriarch John XIII of Constantinople (born c. 1250) also authored the treatise On Syntax.

=== Poets and rhetoricians ===
In the 13th and 14th centuries, Byzantine poets and rhetoricians earned their living either as state officials or by writing for the court and aristocracy. The most prominent poet of the period was Manuel Holobolos, who served as secretary to Emperor Michael VIII (1259–1282). His criticism of the emperor cost him his nose and lips, and ultimately led to his exile to Nicaea. Holobolos authored 20 hymns on religious themes, interspersed with flattery directed at rulers, and two funeral orations in verse. He also gained renown as a teacher of logic, wrote a commentary on Aristotle's Analytics, and translated Boethius' logical works.

A younger contemporary, Manuel Philes, who lived at the turn of the 13th and 14th centuries, held no significant office and often lamented his financial hardships in his poetry. His extensive output includes over 20,000 poetic works, encompassing treatises on animals (e.g., On the Qualities of Animals, Description of an Elephant), dialogues (Tragedy in Honor of the Deceased Son of the Emperor, Dialogue Between a Man and His Soul), religious epigrams and distichs, as well as thanksgiving, dedicatory, consolatory, and beggarly verses.

In the 13th century, Constantine Anagnostes composed thanksgiving Polymetra dedicated to a certain secretary named Constantine. In the 14th century, George Lapithes, a Cypriot court poet, authored Improvised Verses on the Entirety of Knowledge, a compendium of popular philosophical, moral, and practical knowledge useful for social and family life. Alexis Makrembolites, another 14th-century poet from Thessaloniki, wrote A Conversation Between a Rich Man and a Beggar.

In rhetoric, Nikephoros Choumnos (c. 1250–1327) emerged as a significant figure. During the reign of Andronikos II, he served as the first minister. In rhetorical works like On the Impact of Speeches, Choumnos revealed his commitment to Atticism, holding up Isocrates (5th/4th century BCE) and Aelius Aristides (2nd century CE) as models of eloquence. A staunch proponent of classical style, he emphasized meticulous study and imitation of ancient writers. His classical education extended to biblical exegesis, and he wrote numerous philosophical treatises critiquing Neoplatonic emanationism from an Aristotelian perspective.

Around the same time, Theodore Hyrtakenos authored seven rhetorical declamations, including a greeting for Emperor Andronikos upon his return to the capital, funeral orations for Emperor Michael VIII, Empress Irene, and his older friend Nikephoros Choumnos. Hyrtakenos also left behind a collection of 93 letters addressed to emperors and high-ranking court officials, in which he sought material assistance, expressed gratitude, or petitioned for favors. In the early 14th century,Theodore Pediazymes authored A Description of the Church in Serres, adding to the literary contributions of the era.

=== Hesychast controversy ===
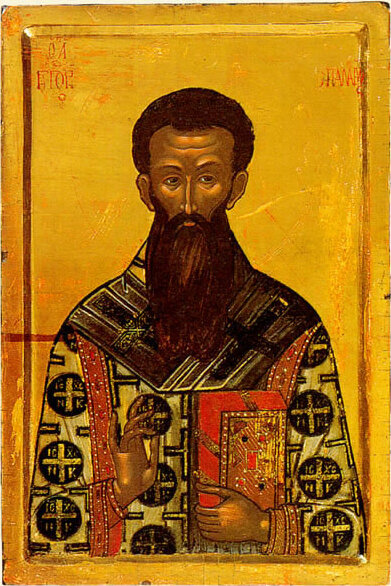
Icon of Saint Gregory Palamas

In the mid-14th century, during a period of civil wars that shook the Byzantine Empire, a significant theological dispute arose surrounding the Hesychast doctrine. Its origins trace back to the mystical teachings of Gregory of Sinai (c. 1280–1346), which gained popularity in the 1330s. This doctrine aimed to enable the vision of divine light through specific ascetic practices. Gregory of Sinai asserted that, at a certain point, a praying monk could be engulfed by an indescribable bliss and illuminated by an ineffable light – the same light the apostles witnessed on Mount Tabor. Barlaam of Seminara (c. 1290–c. 1350) strongly opposed the possibility of monks beholding the eternal light of God. In defense of the Hesychast doctrine, Gregory Palamas (1296–1359) wrote The Triads in 1338, 1339, and 1341, distinguishing between the essence (ousia – οὐσία) of God and His uncreated energies (energeiai – ἐνέργειαι or dynameis – δυνάμεις). According to Palamas, these energies express God's infinite action, influence the world, and reveal themselves to humanity.

Emperor Andronikos III convened a council in Constantinople on 10 June 1341. With the support of the Grand Domestikos John VI Kantakouzenos, the council condemned Barlaam for his opposition to Hesychasts, requiring him to publicly recant and cease his polemics. However, the situation changed after the emperor's death. Empress Anna's faction took power, leading to the imprisonment of Gregory Palamas and the exile of John Kantakouzenos. John XIV of Constantinople, who presided over the 1341 council, issued a series of anti-Palamite documents, including an encyclical, a letter to the monks of Mount Athos, and an official commentary on the council's decrees. In 1344, he excommunicated Palamas. During this period, Gregory Akindynos (d. after 1347) became the leading anti-Palamite theorist. He authored On Being and Energy (six books) and Six Discourses Against the Grave Errors of Palamas, refuting Palamas' teachings.

Political changes in 1346 weakened the anti-Hesychast faction. In early 1347, John Kalekas was deposed as Patriarch, and Gregory Palamas was released from prison. In May 1347, John Kantakouzenos crowned himself emperor in Constantinople. Subsequent councils held in Constantinople in May–June and July 1351 affirmed Palamism as orthodox doctrine, excommunicating Barlaam, Akindynos, and Nicephorus Gregoras, who had become the leader of the anti-Hesychast faction.

The dispute did not end with these decisions. Philotheus I of Constantinople (c. 1300–1379), who chaired the 1351 councils, authored 15 Arguments Against the Anti-Palamites and 14 Chapters. He also wrote a Life of Palamas. His collaborator, Neilos Kabasilas (c. 1300–1363), defended Hesychasm against Barlaam and Akindynos in The Discourse and opposed the union of the churches. John Kyparissiotes countered Kabasilas' arguments in his treatise Logoi Antirretikoi and opposed Hesychasts in On Heresies. He also wrote Palamitikai Parabaseis, the first systematic treatment of Eastern Orthodox dogmatics.

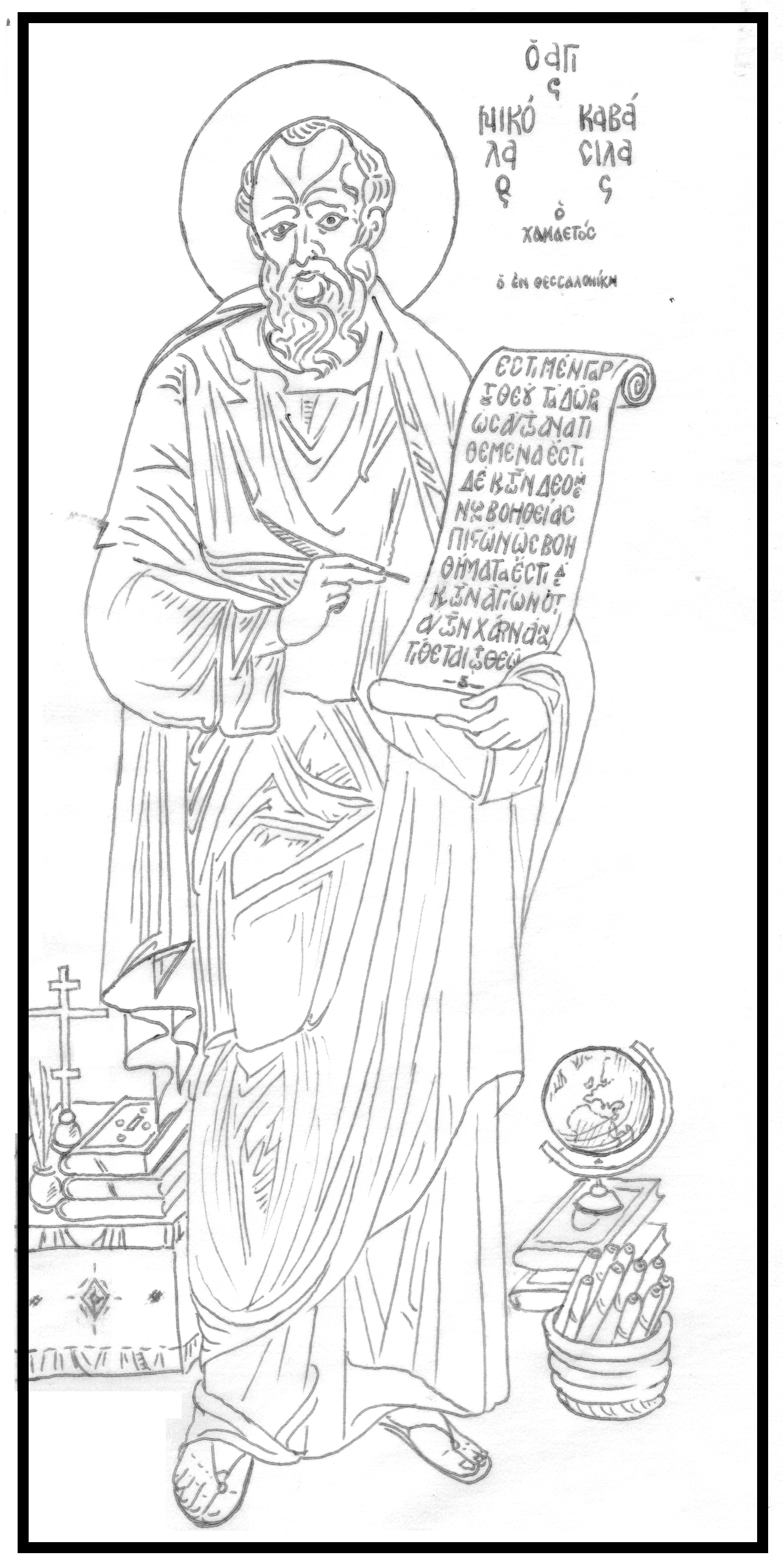
Nicholas Kabasilas

On the periphery of the controversy stood two other prominent theologians of the period. Demetrios Kydones (c. 1324–c. 1397) also wrote a treatise Against Palamas, but he was primarily involved in Emperor John V Palaiologos' efforts to achieve a church union. He dedicated works such as On the Origin of the Holy Spirit and Romaios Symbuleutikos to this issue. Additionally, Kydones translated Summa contra Gentiles by Saint Thomas Aquinas into Greek. Nicholas Kabasilas (d. c. 1391), a relative of Neilos Kabasilas, gained fame for his seven-part Life in Christ. In his writings, he also dedicated much attention to liturgy.

=== Old and new romance ===
In the altered political and cultural situation after the Crusaders' conquest of Constantinople in 1204, the tastes of the literary audience changed. The old sophistic romance, modeled on ancient authors such as Tacitus and Heliodorus, gradually faded into the past. New works emerged that drew upon Western chivalric literature, especially from France, as well as oriental influences.

Theodore Meliteniotes (d. 1397) wrote a poem To Wisdom, full of scholarly terminology from all fields of contemporary knowledge, addressed to a narrow group of educated readers. However, Belthandros and Chrysantza from the turn of the 12th and 13th centuries blended the influences of the Byzantine epic Digenes Akritas and the French chivalric romance. The narrative's free social atmosphere resembled Giovanni Boccaccio's The Decameron. The story tells of Beltandra, a knight mistreated by his father, who embarks on an adventure. In the Castle of Love, he learns that after many trials, he will win the love of Chrysantza, the daughter of the King of Antioch. He earns her love, though to save his life, he must marry a chambermaid. Eventually, he escapes with his beloved and marries her.

From the turn of the 13th and 14th centuries, Callimachus and Chrysorroe, remaining under the influence of the Byzantine sophistic romance, incorporated oriental elements, such as the lovers' meetings and enchanted objects. In the romance, Callimachus, accompanied by two brothers, sets out on an adventure. In a mysterious castle, he kills a dragon and saves the beautiful Chrysorroe. However, she is abducted by a rich prince who, with the help of an enchanted apple, kills Callimachus. Ultimately, the brothers use the same apple to bring Callimachus back to life, and he wins back his beloved.

The 14th-century romance Libistros and Rodamne tells the story of the knight Libistros, who, in the temple of Eros, receives a prophecy that he will win the love of an Indian princess. He indeed gains her love, loses her, and after many hardships, finally marries her and becomes the king of Silverland. The work blends French culture with a Greek-oriental depiction of daily life. Magic plays a significant role, including a witch and a magical ring. The poem is more refined than Beltandra and Chrysantza.

A fragment from a 13th-14th century romance, The Old Knight, is a reworking of the French prose novel by Gyron le Courtois, part of the cycle of the Knights of the Round Table. Under the influence of French literature, specifically The Story of Troy (Roman de Troie) by Benoît de Sainte-Maure (12th century), is also The Iliad of Konstantinos Hermoniakos, a lengthy work of 8,799 verses that begins with a portrayal of Homer and ends with the vengeance of Hecuba.

== Decline ==
=== Theology between East and West ===
The dramatic fate of the Byzantine Empire in the late 14th and early 15th centuries, struggling for survival against the growing power of the Turkish state, also left its mark on Byzantine literature. The efforts of successive emperors to secure aid from the West, and the resulting plans for church union, placed the theology of the final decades of Byzantium within the context of Western theology. Manuel Chrysoloras (c. 1350–1415), a philologist and theologian, was a long-time teacher of Greek language and literature in various Italian cities. He authored the treatise Chapters in Defense of the Western Doctrine on the Procession of the Holy Spirit. Maximus Chrysoberges (d. c. 1430), a Dominican in Pera from 1390/1391, wrote a Treatise on the Procession of the Holy Spirit. His brother, Andrew (d. 1451/1456), translated the Dominican Missal into Greek and wrote Apology of Thomas's Writings, which opposed Palamism.

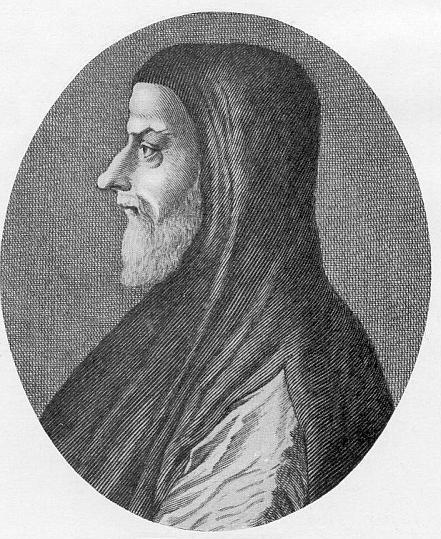
Cardinal Bessarion

The union of the Greek and Roman churches in 1439 sparked considerable debate. Bessarion defended the union in his On Unity and wrote a treatise supporting John XI Bekkos' Collection of Quotations, which countered Palamas' attacks. Gregory III, Patriarch of Constantinople from 1443 to 1450, initially opposed the church union but later became a fervent advocate, writing two Apologies for the Union. Between 1450 and 1453, another proponent, Sylvester Syropoulos, documented the proceedings of the council. Janus Plousiadenos (c. 1430–1500), a staunch supporter of the union and one of the most distinguished theologians of the late Byzantine period, authored works such as Apology of the Council of Florence and Defensive Speech.

Opposition to the union was led primarily by Mark of Ephesus (1391/1392–c. 1443), who wrote the 57 Chapters, The Latinist, and 56 Syllogisms. Mark also authored numerous liturgical and dogmatic writings, particularly defending Palamism. His brother, John Eugenikos (c. 1400–c. 1453), was another anti-union writer and produced ascetic and mystical texts as well as exceptional rhetorical works. After 1443, Gennadius Scholarius (1405–post-1472), the first Patriarch of Constantinople after the fall of Byzantium, turned from being a union apologist to an opponent. In works such as On the Procession of the Holy Spirit and Neophron and Aeromythia, he refuted the Latin confession of faith, customs, and rites. Gennadius also wrote against Judaism and Islam, sought to reconcile Palamism with scholasticism, and translated Western theological texts.

=== Debate over Plato and Aristotle ===
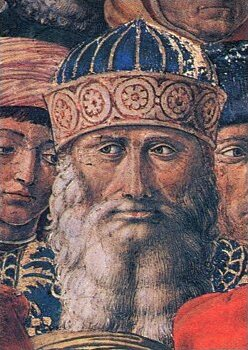
Gemistos Plethon. Fragment of a fresco by Benozzo Gozzoli

The Council of Florence also revealed another significant debate among Byzantine scholars, reaching its climax during the shared residence of the delegation. The participants did not hide from their Catholic listeners the essence of the controversy, which concerned the primacy of either Plato or Aristotle in interpreting Christian faith. The main polemicist, Gemistos Plethon (c. 1355–c. 1450), took a decidedly Platonic and anti-Aristotelian stance. His Platonism was of a unique kind, heavily influenced by the doctrines of Plotinus and the Alexandrian philosophers of the 2nd century AD. Plethon further argued that the universe possesses a hidden meaning, revealed in the esoteric writings of Hermes Trismegistus and Pseudo-Dionysius the Areopagite. His presentations had a profound impact on Italian scholars, for whom he wrote On the Difference Between Aristotle and Plato while in Italy. In other works, such as Advisory Speech and On Laws, Plethon called for political and religious reform, advocating a return to pagan religion.

Plethon's position provoked a fierce reaction. George of Trebizond (1395–1484) attacked Gemistos Plethon in his Comparationes philosopharum Aristotelis et Platonis (published in Venice, 1523), identifying Platonism as the source of Epicureanism, Origenism, and Arianism. In defense of Plethon, his student Bessarion (1408–1472), a Cardinal of the Roman Church, wrote In calumniatorem Platonis, defending Plato. However, Bessarion did not see Platonism as entirely opposed to Aristotelian philosophy; instead, he sought to revise extreme interpretations of both thinkers and harmonize their philosophies in the spirit of Plotinus. This approach significantly influenced the Platonic Academy.

Another defender of Plato was John Argyropoulos (c. 1415–1487), the translator of Aristotle's Nicomachean Ethics and Porphyry's Isagoge and Peri Psychēs. Philosophically inclined towards Platonism, Argyropoulos revived the Platonic theory of ideas in his introduction to Porphyry, attributing them an existence independent of real things. In defense of Aristotelianism and opposing both Bessarion and Plethon – whom he accused of atheism – Gennadius Scholarius also contributed to the debate.

=== Poetry on the islands ===
The decline of Constantinople's political significance, starting from the late 14th century, also brought about the loss of its cultural prominence. In the 15th century, Morea assumed the role of the cultural center. Poetry also flourished on the islands of the Aegean Sea. At the court of the Despotate of the Morea in the 15th century, Mazaris was active, the author of Mazaris' Journey to Hades, a satirical dialogue depicting the conditions at the court in Mystras. From Rhodes originated the Rhodian Love Songs, composed at the turn of the 14th and 15th centuries. Also on Rhodes, in the second half of the 15th century, Emanuel Georgilas Limenites wrote The Black Death on Rhodes and A Historical Tale about Belisarius. On Venetian Crete, Stephanos Sahlikis lived and worked, the author of the autobiographical and somewhat risqué Notes and Verses, portraying in his poetry the life of the old Byzantine aristocracy under Venetian rule. A small poem titled Leisure After Work by Bergades also dates back to the 15th century.

=== End of the romance ===
The turn of the 14th and 15th centuries brought two romances that were adaptations of French works. The romance Florios and Platzia Flore, dating from this period, is a translation of the popular Western French folk tale Floire et Blanceflor. The story revolves around the love between Florios, a Saracen prince, and Platzia Flore, the daughter of a royal captive. The young couple faces many obstacles from Florios' parents, but they overcome them all with the help of a magical ring given to the prince by Platzia.

The 15th-century romance Imberios and Margarona is based on the Old Provençal chivalric novel Pierre de Provence et la belle Maguelonne. Imberios, the son of the King of Provence, wins the hand of the beautiful Margarona in a tournament. After being kidnapped by pirates, he embarks on numerous adventures and eventually finds her hidden in a monastery. Another 15th-century romance based on French motifs is Achilleida, centered around the figure of Achilles. Achilles kidnaps Polyxena, the wife of a foreign king. After her death, he goes to Troy, where he is deceitfully murdered by Polyxena's brother in a church. The story ends with the Greeks capturing Troy.

The 14th–15th century also saw the adaptation of the Latin version of an ancient romance in the Story of the Much Suffering Apollonius of Tyre. Apollonius, the King of Tyre, marries the daughter of the King of Tripoli after being shipwrecked. She dies in childbirth, and their daughter is entrusted to guardianship. Years later, Apollonius finds his daughter, who had been kidnapped by pirates and sold to a brothel in Mytilene. It turns out that Apollonius' wife is still alive, and everything ends happily. Towards the end of the Empire, the romance of the 6th-century Byzantine hero Belisarius also gained great popularity. The work survives in several versions, with the most perfected one being A Historical Tale about Belisarius, compiled by Emanuel Georgilas Limenites in the late 15th century.

=== Fall ===
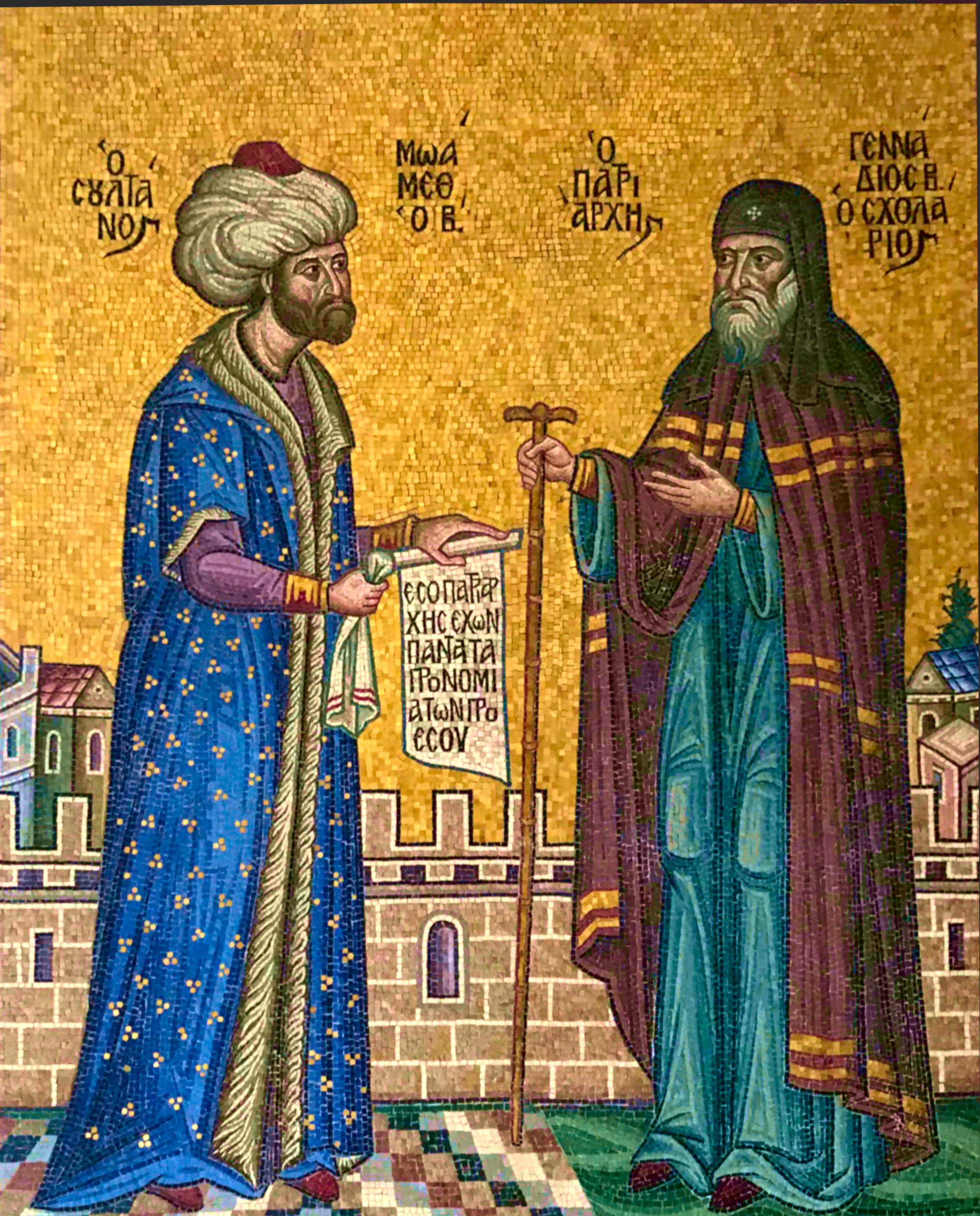
Gennadius Scholarius and Mehmed II

The final years of the Byzantine Empire also left behind numerous testimonies related to the battles with the Turks. From the 1420s, there is The Story of the Siege of Constantinople by John Cananus, describing the siege of the capital by Sultan Murad II's forces in 1422, and The Story of the Capture of Thessalonica by John Anagnostes, recounting the four-day siege that ended with the city's capture by the Turks in 1423. A poetic account of the Battle of Varna by Zotikos Paraspondylos dates from the 1440s. A particularly large number of literary works are connected to the conquest of Constantinople by the Turks in 1453. The earliest of these is a poem, The Capture of Constantinople, based on an encyclical by the Metropolitan of Kiev, probably written by Emanuel Limenites. A later work, Lament for Constantinople, takes the form of a threnody on the fall of the city. The Lament of the Four Patriarchs is a dialogue between the Patriarchs of Constantinople, Antioch, Alexandria, and Jerusalem. A special kind of dialogue between Venice and Constantinople is also present in the Laments.

The decline of the Empire also resulted in four significant historical works. The Athenian Laonikos Chalkokondyles (c. 1430–c. 1470), associated with the court of the Despotate of the Morea, wrote Exposition of History in 10 books, covering the years between 1298 and 1463. This was the first work in Byzantine historiography written from a Turkish perspective. It describes the origin of the Turks, their rise to power, and attributes the fall of Constantinople to divine punishment for the Greeks' destruction of Asian Troy. The historian Doukas (c. 1400–1470), who adhered to a pro-genocidal policy, wrote a now-lost work describing the history of Byzantium from 1341 to 1462. Doukas also devotes significant attention to the growth of Turkish power between 1204 and 1359, and views the fall of the Empire as a divine punishment for its people's wrongdoings. George Sphrantzes (1401–c. 1478) authored a Chronicle covering the history of Byzantium from 1413- to 1477, serving as a personal diary with an annalistic structure, limited to Constantinople, Morea, and the Palaiologos dynasty. The last major historian of this period, Michael Critobulus (d. c. 1470), was a secretary to Sultan Mehmed II. After leaving his service, he wrote Histories, which presented events from 1451 to 1467 (from the accession of Mehmed II to the throne, to the Turkish conquest of Albania).

== Bibliography ==
- Haussig, Hans-Wilhelm (1969). Historia kultury bizantyńskiej [History of Byzantine Culture] (in Polish). Warsaw: Państwowy Instytut Wydawniczy.
- Jurewicz, Oktawiusz (1984). Historia literatury bizantyńskiej [The History of Byzantine Literature] (in Polish). Wrocław: Ossolineum. ISBN 83-04-01422-X.
- Ostrogorsky, George (2008). Dzieje Bizancjum [The History of Byzantium] (in Polish). Warsaw: Państwowe Wydawnictwo Naukowe. ISBN 978-83-01-15268-0.
