= List of Byzantine scholars =

This is a list of Byzantine scientists and other scholars.

== Before the 9th century ==
Most important scholars known before the Macedonian Renaissance were active under the Justinian dynasty.

- Theon of Alexandria (335–405), mathematician
- Hypatia (370–415), mathematician, astronomer, philosopher
- Anthemius of Tralles (c. 474–before 558), mathematician and architect of Hagia Sophia
- Eutocius of Ascalon (c. 480–c. 540), mathematician
- John Philoponus (490–570), mathematician, physicist, theologian
- Isidore of Miletus (6th century), mathematicist, physicist and architect of Hagia Sophia
- Cassianus Bassus (6th–7th century), author of Geoponika
- Leontios (died 706), emperor, astronomer, mathematician and engineer
- George of Pisidia (6th–7th century), scholar, zoologist and astronomer
- Timotheos of Gaza (6th–7th century), zoologist
- Stephen of Byzantium (6th–7th century), geographer
- Paul of Aegina (7th century), physician
- Callinicus of Heliopolis (7th century), architect; invented the Greek fire
- Stephen of Alexandria (7th century), mathematician and astronomer
- Theophilus Protospatharius (7th century), physician

== The Macedonian Renaissance ==
The Macedonian Renaissance occurred in the period of the Macedonian dynasty from 867 to 1056.

- Leo the Mathematician (c. 790–after 869)
- Georgios Monachos (9th century)
- Photius I of Constantinople (c. 810–c. 893), Greek philosophy
- Saint Cyril the Philosopher (826 or 827–869)
- Constantine VII (reigned 913–959)
- Michael Psellus (1018–1078)
- Michael Attaliates (11th century)
- Symeon Seth (11th century)
- Leo VI (reigned 886–912)
- Arethas of Caesarea (c. 860-aft. 932), Archbishop, theologian and Greek commentator

== The Komnenian period and after ==
The Komnenian period ranged from 1081 to about 1185.

- Anna Comnena (1083–1153)
- Theodore Prodromos (c. 1100–c. 1165/70), author of prose and poetry
- Eustathius of Thessalonica (c. 1115–1195/6)
- Michael of Ephesus (early or mid-12th century), philosopher, physics
- Michael Glykas (12th century), mathematician and astronomer
- Joannes Zonaras (12th century), historian
- John Kinnamos (12th century), historian
- Niketas Choniates (c. 1155–1215 or 1216), historian
- Nikephoros Blemmydes (1197–1272)

== The Palaiologian Renaissance ==
The Palaiologian Renaissance was mostly contemporary with the Renaissance of the 12th century. The Palaiologos dynasty ruled from c. 1260 to 1453. A number of Greek scholars contributed to the establishment of this renaissance also in Western Europe.

- Demetrios Pepagomenos (1200–1300), zoologist, botanologist and pharmacist
- George Akropolites (1220–1282), astronomer
- Gregory Chioniades (died 1302), mathematician and astronomer
- Manuel Holobolos (1230–1305), scholar, teacher
- George Pachymeres (1242–1310)
- Manuel Moschopoulos (13th–beginning of the 14th century) grammarian
- Constantinos Lykites (13th–14th century), astronomer
- John Pediasimos (13th–14th century), mathematician
- Nikephoros Choumnos (c. 1250/55–1327), scholar, meteorologist and physicist
- Maximus Planudes (1260–c. 1305), grammarian and theologian,
- Theodore Metochites (1270–1332), physician and mathematician
- Barlaam of Seminara (c. 1290–1348), mathematician and astronomer
- Nicephorus Gregoras (1295–1359/60), mathematician and astronomer
- Demetrius Triclinius (before c. 1300), grammarian with knowledge of astronomy,
- Thomas Magister (14th century), grammarian
- Theodore of Melitene (1320–1393), astronomer
- Isaac Argyros (1310–1372), mathematician and astronomer
- John VI Kantakouzenos (reigned 1347–1355), historian
- Manuel Chrysoloras (c. 1355–1415), translator, philosopher
- Joannes Chortasmenos (1370–1437), scholar, mathematician and astronomer

== See also ==
- Byzantine science
- Byzantine scholars in Renaissance
