= Sakellarios (surname) =

Sakellarios (Greek: Σακελλάριος), genitive and feminine form Sakellariou (Σακελλαρίου), is a Greek surname deriving from the Byzantine office of sakellarios. Notable people with the surname include:

- Aggeliki Sakellariou Greek linguist and philologist
- Alekos Sakellarios (1913–1991), Greek film director
- Alexandros Sakellariou (1887–1982), Greek admiral and defence minister
- Georgios Sakellarios (1765–1838), Greek physician of Ali Pasha
- Pericles A. Sakellarios (1905–1985), Greek architect
- Rita Sakellariou (1934–1999), Greek singer

== See also ==
- Sakellaridis
- Sakellaropoulos
