= Lectionary 341 =

Lectionary ℓ 341
- New Testament manuscript
- Text: Evangelistarium
- Date: 11th-century
- Script: Greek
- Found: 1882
- Now at: Bodleian Library
- Size: 31.0 cm by 23.5 cm
- Type: Byzantine text-type

Lectionary 341 (Gregory-Aland), designated by siglum ℓ 341 (in the Gregory-Aland numbering) is a Greek manuscript of the New Testament, on parchment. Palaeographically it has been assigned to the 11th-century. The manuscript has not survived in complete condition.

== Description ==
The codex contains lessons from the Gospel of John, Matthew, Luke, and Mark (Evangelistarium) on 355 parchment leaves. The leaves are measured (31.0 cm by 23.5 cm).

The text is written in Greek minuscule letters, in two columns per page, 22 lines per page. It has music notes, pictures, and Menologium.

The codex contains weekday Gospel lessons.

== History ==
Scrivener dated the manuscript to the 12th-century, Gregory dated it to the 11th or 12th century. It has been assigned by the Institute for New Testament Textual Research (INTF) to the 11th-century. It once belonged to the Palaeologi. It was bought for the British Museum in 1882.

The manuscript was added to the list of New Testament manuscripts by Scrivener (288^{e}) and Gregory (number 341^{e}). Gregory saw it in 1883.

Currently the codex is housed at the Bodleian Library (Auct. T. inf. 2. 7) in Oxford, England.

The fragment is not cited in critical editions of the Greek New Testament (UBS4, NA27).

== See also ==
- List of New Testament lectionaries
- Biblical manuscript
- Textual criticism
- Lectionary 340

== Bibliography ==
- Gregory, Caspar René (1900). Textkritik des Neuen Testaments. Vol. 1. Leipzig: J.C. Hinrichs’sche Buchhandlung. p. 417.
