= Sakellaridis =

Sakellaridis (Greek: Σακελλαρίδης) is a Greek surname. The feminine form is Sakellaridi (Σακελλαρίδη) deriving from the Byzantine office of sakellarios with the patronymic suffix -opoulos, literally meaning "descendant of sakellarios". It is the surname of:

- Gabriel Sakellaridis (born 1980), Greek politician and government spokesman
- Nikos Sakellaridis (born 1970), Greece national team footballer
- Sapfo Sakellaridi (born 2003), Greek tennis player
- Stefanos Sakellaridis (born 2004), Greek tennis player
- Theophrastos Sakellaridis (1883–1950), Greek composer

== See also ==
- Sakellarios (surname)
- Sakellaropoulos
