= Synopsis Chronike =

Synopsis Chronike (Greek: Σύνοψις Χρονικὴ) may refer to:

- Synopsis Chronike of Constantine Manasses, 12th century
- Synopsis Chronike (Skoutariotes), 13th century, attributed to Theodore Skoutariotes
