= Sylvester Syropoulos =

Sylvester (or Silvestros) Syropoulos (Greek: Σίλβεστρος Συρόπουλος; c. 1400 – aft. 1464) was a Byzantine official, the grand ecclesiarch (megas ekklesiarches) of the Hagia Sophia and the dikaiophylax of the Patriarchate of Constantinople. He was a native of Constantinople.

Syropoulos was a member of the Byzantine delegation to the Council of Florence in 1438–39. He signed the decree of union of the Latin and Greek churches. Upon his return to Constantinople, he claimed to have acted under duress and disavowed the union. He became a supporter Archbishop Mark of Ephesus, leader of the anti-unionist movement. In 1443, he composed his Memoirs (Ἀπομνημονεύματα, Apomnemoneumata), an important first-hand account of the council, especially of its behind-the-scenes intrigue. Although his account is biased against the council, he was not a fabricator and his partisanship is generally no worse than that of the council itself.

According to its most recent editor, his memoirs were redacted and reissued around 1461.
