= Exokatakoiloi =

Exokatakoiloi (Greek: ἐξωκατάκοιλοι), latinized as Exocatacœli, was a term attested since the 11th century for the principal officials of the Patriarch of Constantinople or a bishop of the Eastern Church: these were the steward or oikonomos (the patriarchal official was prefixed with megas, "grand"), the treasurer or [megas] sakellarios, the sacristan or [megas] skeuophylax, the record-keeper or chartophylax, and the head of the sakellion. Later, a sixth member was added, the protekdikos.

== Sources ==
- Kazhdan, Alexander (1991). "Exokatakoiloi". In Kazhdan, Alexander (ed.). The Oxford Dictionary of Byzantium. New York and Oxford: Oxford University Press. p. 771. ISBN 978-0-19-504652-6.
