= Sakellaropoulos =

Sakellaropoulos (Greek: Σακελλαρόπουλος) is a Greek surname. The feminine form is Sakellaropoulou (Σακελλαροπούλου) deriving from the Byzantine office of sakellarios with the patronymic suffix -opoulos, literally meaning "descendant of sakellarios". Notable people with the surname include:

- Katerina Sakellaropoulou (born 1956), Greek judge and President of Greece
- Iraklis Sakellaropoulos (born 1888) a Greek track and field champion marathon runner
- Konstantinos Sakellaropoulos ( 1884 - 1970 ), Greek diplomat
- Loukas Sakellaropoulos (1882 - 1958), Greek military officer and politician.
- Theodoros Sakellaropoulos (1923–1997), Greek chess master

== See also ==
- Sakellaridis
- Sakellarios (surname)
