= Lectionary 337 =

Lectionary ℓ 337
- New Testament manuscript
- Text: Evangelistarium †
- Date: 12th-century
- Script: Greek
- Found: 1882
- Now at: British Library
- Size: 29 cm by 22 cm
- Type: Byzantine text-type

Lectionary 337 (Gregory-Aland), designated by siglum ℓ 337 (in the Gregory-Aland numbering) is a Greek manuscript of the New Testament, on parchment. Palaeographically it has been assigned to the 12th-century. The manuscript has not survived in complete condition.

== Description ==
The original codex contained lessons from the Gospel of John, Matthew and Luke (Evangelistarium) with lacunae on 103 parchment leaves. The leaves are measured (29 cm by 22 cm).

The text is written in Greek minuscule letters, in two columns per page, 27 lines per page. It has no musical notes.

The codex contains weekday Gospel lessons from Easter to Pentecost and Saturday/Sunday Gospel lessons for the other weeks.

== History ==
Scrivener dated the manuscript to the 13th-century, Gregory dated it to the 12th or 13th-century. It is presently assigned by the INTF to the 12th-century.

In 1882 H. C. Clements presented it for the British Museum.

The manuscript was added to the list of New Testament manuscripts by Scrivener (285^{e}) and Gregory (number 337^{e}). Gregory saw it in 1883.

Currently the codex is housed at the British Library (Add MS 31949) in London.

The fragment is not cited in critical editions of the Greek New Testament (UBS4, NA27).

== See also ==
- List of New Testament lectionaries
- Biblical manuscript
- Textual criticism
- Lectionary 336

== Bibliography ==
- Gregory, Caspar René (1900). Textkritik des Neuen Testaments. Vol. 1. Leipzig: J.C. Hinrichs’sche Buchhandlung. p. 416.
