= Lectionary 334 =

Lectionary ℓ 334
- New Testament manuscript
- Text: Evangelistarium †
- Date: 11th-century
- Script: Greek
- Now at: British Library
- Size: 32.8 cm by 25.8 cm
- Type: Byzantine text-type
- Note: palimpsest

Lectionary 334 (Gregory-Aland), designated by siglum ℓ 334 (in the Gregory-Aland numbering) is a Greek manuscript of the New Testament, on parchment. Palaeographically it has been assigned to the 11th-century. It is a palimpsest The manuscript has not survived in complete condition.

== Description ==
The original codex contained lessons from the Gospel of Matthew (Evangelistarium), with lacunae on 65 parchment leaves. The leaves are measured (32.8 cm by 25.8 cm).

The text is written in Greek minuscule letters, in two columns per page, 22 lines per page.

It is a palimpsest. The upper text contains a menaion. According to the colophon it was written by Ignatius, Metropolitan of Selymbria in Thrace, in the year 1431.

The codex contains Gospel lessons according to the Byzantine Church order.

== History ==
Scrivener dated the manuscript to the 8th-century, Gregory dated it to the 11th-century. It is presently assigned by the INTF to the 11th-century.

The manuscript was added to the list of New Testament manuscripts by Scrivener (282^{e}) and Gregory (number 334^{e}). It was examined by T. K. Abbott and Mahaffy. Gregory saw it in 1883.

Formerly it was held in Blenheim (3. D. 13). Currently the codex is housed at the British Library (Add MS 31919) in London.

The fragment is not cited in critical editions of the Greek New Testament (UBS4, NA27).

== See also ==
- List of New Testament lectionaries
- Biblical manuscript
- Textual criticism
- Lectionary 333

== Bibliography ==
- Gregory, Caspar René (1900). Textkritik des Neuen Testaments. Vol. 1. Leipzig: J.C. Hinrichs’sche Buchhandlung. p. 416.
