= Lectionary 335 =

Lectionary ℓ 335
- New Testament manuscript
- Text: Evangelistarium
- Date: 11th century
- Script: Greek
- Now at: British Library
- Size: 23.7 cm by 19.3 cm
- Type: Byzantine text-type

Lectionary 335 (Gregory-Aland), designated by siglum ℓ 335 (in the Gregory-Aland numbering) is a Greek manuscript of the New Testament, on parchment. Palaeographically it has been assigned to the 11th-century. The manuscript has survived in complete condition.

== Description ==
The original codex contained lessons from the Gospel of John, Matthew and Luke (Evangelistarium) on 226 parchment leaves. The leaves are 23.7 by 19.3 cm (9.3 by 7.6 in).

The text is written in Greek minuscule letters, in two columns per page, 21 lines per page. It has no musical notes.

The codex contains weekday Gospel lessons from Easter to Pentecost and Saturday/Sunday Gospel lessons for the other weeks.

== History ==
Scrivener and Gregory dated the manuscript to the 11th-century. It is presently assigned by the INTF to the 11th-century.

The manuscript was added to the list of New Testament manuscripts by Scrivener (283^{e}) and Gregory (number 335^{e}). Gregory saw it in 1883.

Formerly it was held in Blenheim (3. C. 14). Currently the codex is housed at the British Library (Add MS 31920) in London. It was digitized by the INTF.

The fragment is not cited in critical editions of the Greek New Testament (UBS4, NA27).

== See also ==
- List of New Testament lectionaries
- Biblical manuscript
- Textual criticism
- Lectionary 334

== Bibliography ==
- Gregory, Caspar René (1900). Textkritik des Neuen Testaments. Vol. 1. Leipzig: J.C. Hinrichs’sche Buchhandlung. p. 416.
