= Dikaiophylax =

The dikaiophylax (Greek: δικαιοφύλαξ, "guardian of the laws") was a Byzantine judicial office of the 11th–15th centuries.

The title is first attested in the middle of the 11th century, both in Constantinople and the provinces. Its holders dealt with ecclesiastical cases and had to combine knowledge of civil law and canon law. Initially, the office was given to both lay and ecclesiastical officials, but from the reign of Michael VIII Palaiologos (r. 1259–1282) it was only given to churchmen.

The most notable holder was Theodore Skoutariotes, who was appointed after the reconquest of Constantinople by Michael VIII. From Skoutariotes on, all dikaiophylakes combined the office with one of the positions reserved for the exokatakoiloi and were counted among the latter.

== Sources ==
- Kazhdan, Alexander, ed. (1991). The Oxford Dictionary of Byzantium. New York and Oxford: Oxford University Press. ISBN 978-0-19-504652-6.
