= Lectionary 339 =

Lectionary ℓ 339
- New Testament manuscript
- Text: Evangelistarium †
- Date: 13th-century
- Script: Greek
- Found: 1872
- Now at: British Library
- Size: 28.2 cm by 20.9 cm
- Type: Byzantine text-type

Lectionary 339 (Gregory-Aland), designated by siglum ℓ 339 (in the Gregory-Aland numbering) is a Greek manuscript of the New Testament, on parchment. Palaeographically it has been assigned to the 13th-century. The manuscript has not survived in complete condition.

== Description ==
The original codex contained lessons from the Gospel of John, Matthew and Luke (Evangelistarium) with lacunae on 207 parchment leaves. The leaves are measured (28.2 cm by 20.9 cm).

The text is written in Greek uncial letters, in two columns per page, 25 lines per page. It is written in minuscule script. The titles are written in gold, initial letters are written in gold and colours. It has music notes and pictures.

The codex contains weekday Gospel lessons.

== History ==
Scrivener dated the manuscript to the 12th or 13th-century, Gregory dated it to the 13th or 14th-century. It is presently assigned by the INTF to the 13th-century.

In 1872 it was bought from Sotheby's for the British Museum.

The manuscript was added to the list of New Testament manuscripts by Scrivener (59^{e}) and Gregory (number 339^{e}). Gregory saw it in 1883.

Currently the codex is housed at the British Library (Egerton MS 2163) in London.

The fragment is not cited in critical editions of the Greek New Testament (UBS4, NA27).

== See also ==
- List of New Testament lectionaries
- Biblical manuscript
- Textual criticism
- Lectionary 338

== Bibliography ==
- Gregory, Caspar René (1900). Textkritik des Neuen Testaments. Vol. 1. Leipzig: J.C. Hinrichs’sche Buchhandlung. pp. 416–417.
