= Lectionary 338 =

Lectionary ℓ 338
- New Testament manuscript
- Text: Evangelistarium †
- Date: 10th-century
- Script: Greek
- Found: 1872
- Now at: British Library
- Size: 20.1 cm by 15.5 cm
- Type: Byzantine text-type

Lectionary 338 (Gregory-Aland), designated by siglum ℓ 338 (in the Gregory-Aland numbering) is a Greek manuscript of the New Testament, on parchment. Palaeographically it has been assigned to the 10th-century. The manuscript has not survived in complete condition.

== Description ==
The original codex contained lessons from the Gospels (Evangelistarium) with lacunae on 157 parchment leaves. The leaves are measured (20.1 cm by 15.5 cm).

The text is written in Greek uncial letters, in two columns per page, 22 lines per page. It is a palimpsest, the upper text contains writings of Chrysostomos. It is written in early minuscule script.

The codex contains weekday Gospel lessons from Easter to Pentecost and Saturday/Sunday Gospel lessons for the other weeks.

== History ==
Scrivener and Gregory dated the manuscript to the 10th-century. It is presently assigned by the INTF to the 10th-century.

In 1872 it was bought for the British Museum.

The manuscript was added to the list of New Testament manuscripts by Scrivener (499^{e}) and Gregory (number 338^{e}). Gregory saw it in 1883.

Currently the codex is housed at the British Library (Burney 408) in the London.

The fragment is not cited in the critical editions of the Greek New Testament (UBS4, NA27).

== See also ==
- List of New Testament lectionaries
- Biblical manuscript
- Textual criticism
- Lectionary 337

== Bibliography ==
- Gregory, Caspar René (1900). Textkritik des Neuen Testaments. Vol. 1. Leipzig: J.C. Hinrichs’sche Buchhandlung. p. 416.
