= Lectionary 340 =

Lectionary ℓ 340
- New Testament manuscript
- Text: Evangelistarium
- Date: 13th-century
- Script: Greek
- Found: 1872
- Now at: British Library
- Size: 18.7 cm by 14.3 cm
- Type: Byzantine text-type

Lectionary 340 (Gregory-Aland), designated by siglum ℓ 340 (in the Gregory-Aland numbering) is a Greek manuscript of the New Testament, on parchment. Palaeographically it has been assigned to the 13th-century. The manuscript has not survived in complete condition.

== Description ==
The original codex contained lessons from the Acts of the Apostles and Catholic Epistles (Apostolarium) with lacunae on 276 parchment leaves. The leaves are measured (18.7 cm by 14.3 cm).

The text is written in Greek minuscule letters, in one column per page, 26 lines per page.

The codex contains weekday Gospel lessons.

== History ==
Scrivener dated the manuscript to the 14th century, Gregory dated it to the 13th or 14th century. It has been assigned by the INTF to the 13th century.

The manuscript was added to the list of New Testament manuscripts by Scrivener (258^{e}) and Gregory (number 340^{e}). Gregory saw it in 1883.

Currently the codex is housed at the British Library (Harley MS 5561).

The fragment is not cited in critical editions of the Greek New Testament (UBS4, NA27).

== See also ==
- List of New Testament lectionaries
- Biblical manuscript
- Textual criticism
- Lectionary 339

== Bibliography ==
- Gregory, Caspar René (1900). Textkritik des Neuen Testaments. Vol. 1. Leipzig: J.C. Hinrichs’sche Buchhandlung. p. 417.
