= Lectionary 336 =

Lectionary ℓ 336
- New Testament manuscript
- Text: Evangelistarium †
- Date: 14th-century
- Script: Greek
- Now at: British Library
- Size: 26 cm by 20.5 cm
- Type: Byzantine text-type

Lectionary 336 (Gregory-Aland), designated by siglum ℓ 336 (in the Gregory-Aland numbering) is a Greek manuscript of the New Testament, on parchment. Palaeographically it has been assigned to the 14th century. The manuscript has not survived in complete condition.

== Description ==
The original codex contained lessons from the Matthew and Luke (Evangelistarium) with lacunae on 178 parchment leaves. The leaves are measured (26 cm by 20.5 cm).

The text is written in Greek minuscule letters, in two columns per page, 24 lines per page. It has musical notes.

The codex contains weekday Gospel lessons according to the Byzantine Church order.

== History ==
Scrivener dated the manuscript to the 13th-century, Gregory dated it to the 14th-century, other paleographers to the 11th or 12th-century. It is now assigned by the INTF to the 14th-century.

The manuscript was added to the list of New Testament manuscripts by Scrivener (284^{e}) and Gregory (number 336^{e}). Gregory saw it in 1883.

It used to be held in Blenheim (3. C. 13), but is now housed at the British Library (Add MS 31921) in London.

The fragment is not cited in critical editions of the Greek New Testament (UBS4, NA27).

== See also ==
- List of New Testament lectionaries
- Biblical manuscript
- Textual criticism
- Lectionary 335

== Bibliography ==
- Gregory, Caspar René (1900). Textkritik des Neuen Testaments. Vol. 1. Leipzig: J.C. Hinrichs’sche Buchhandlung. p. 416.
