= John Pediasimos =

Byzantine Greek churchman and polymath

- Born: c. 1250
- Died: early 14th century
- Scientific career
- Fields: Astronomy; Mathematics; Philosophy
- Academic advisors: George Akropolites; Manuel Holobolos

John Pediasimos (Greek: Ἰωάννης Πεδιάσιμος; c. 1250 – early 14th century), also known as John Pothos, was a Byzantine Eastern Orthodox cleric, scholar, astronomer, mathematician, mythologist, syllogistic, musician, and physician active at Constantinople, Ohrid and Thessalonica.

He was born about 1250, and for the first few years of his life studied in Constantinople under the teachers Manuel Holobolos and George Akropolites. Gregory of Cyprus was a fellow pupil. After his studies he was a given the prestigious position of hypatos ton philosophon. He later served as chartophylax in the Archbishopric of Ohrid (c. 1280), where he also taught. If his identification with a certain megas sakellarios John Pothos is correct, by 1284 he was in Thessalonica. John wrote on many subjects on his fields of study.

== Sources ==
- Talbot, Alice-Mary (1991). "Pediasimos, John". In Kazhdan, Alexander (ed.). The Oxford Dictionary of Byzantium. Oxford and New York: Oxford University Press. p. 1615. ISBN 0-19-504652-8.
