= Theodore Skoutariotes =

Byzantine cleric

Theodore Skoutariotes (Latinized as Scutariotes; Greek: Θεόδωρος Σκουταριώτης; born c. 1230) was a Byzantine cleric and official during the reign of Michael VIII Palaiologos (r. 1259–1282).

Skoutariotes was born in the latter half of the mid. As a deacon, he served as epi ton deeseon (receiver of petitions) and was named as dikaiophylax in 1270. He served as Michael VIII's ambassador to the Pope in 1277, and was metropolitan bishop of Kyzikos from 1277 until he was deposed in 1282 by Andronikos II (because he supported Michael VIII's efforts at union between the Catholic and Orthodox churches). Skoutariotes owned a rich library and is known from the notes in his collection of manuscripts.

The German historian A. Heisenberg identified Skoutariotes with the anonymous author of the Synopsis Chronike, a chronicle preserved in the Marcian Library in Venice (Marc. gr. 407) which begins with the Creation and reaches to 1261. The chronicle is particularly valuable for its additions to the narrative of George Akropolites, which are of great importance for the history of 13th-century Byzantium. The first part of the chronicle uses the 7th-century history of John of Antioch, which in turn used the 4th-century chronicle of Ammianus Marcellinus.

== Sources ==
- Kazhdan, Alexander, ed. (1991). The Oxford Dictionary of Byzantium. Oxford and New York: Oxford University Press. pp. 1912–1913. ISBN 0-19-504652-8.
- Neville, Leonora (2018). Guide to Byzantine Historical Writing. Cambridge University Press. pp. 232–236. ISBN 978-1-107-03998-8.
- Zafeiris, Konstantinos (2011). "The issue of the authorship of the Synopsis Chronike and Theodore Skoutariotes". Revue des études byzantines. 69 (1): 253–263. doi:10.3406/rebyz.2011.4937.
- Bernard, Outtier; et al. (2019-12-09). Armenia between Byzantium and the Orient: Celebrating the Memory of Karen Yuzbashian (1927–2009). BRILL. pp. 230–580. ISBN 978-90-04-39774-3.
