= George Metochites =

George Metochites (Greek: Γεώργιος Μετοχίτης; c. 1250 – 1328) was an archdeacon in Constantinople during the 1270s and early 1280s, and an important, fervent supporter of the Union of the Greek and Latin Churches that was agreed to at the Second Council of Lyons (1274).

== Life ==
Of Metochites' early years, nothing is known. He first appears in George Pachymeres' History in the year 1273 as one of a small group of clerics who backed the Emperor Michael VIII Palaiologos's negotiations for ecclesial union with Rome. Following the Council of Lyons, he served for a time as Michael's ambassador at the papal courts of Gregory X, Innocent V, John XXI, and Nicholas III; among other things, he argued, unsuccessfully, for a joint Greek-Latin crusade against the Turks. After the Union of Lyons was dissolved following the Emperor Michael's death (December 1282), Metochites, along with the patriarch John Bekkos and the archdeacon Constantine Meliteniotes, found himself in political disfavor; anti-unionist councils at Constantinople in 1283 and 1285 reduced him to lay status and charged him with heresy; and he spent some 45 years — by far the greater portion of his life — in prison for remaining loyal to his unionist beliefs. His son, Theodore Metochites, who did not share his father's views on union with Rome, gained great wealth and influence under the Emperor Andronikos II, and was a renowned Byzantine humanist; among his pupils was Nikephoros Gregoras, the historian and anti-palamite theologian. It seems likely that the younger Metochites kept his father supplied with books and writing material; at all events, the elder Metochites wrote a number of books during those 45 years, giving theological and historical justifications for ecclesial union. His books have received little scholarly attention, in part because of the strange, difficult style of Greek in which they are written.

== Writings and editions ==
Some of George Metochites' writings were edited from the Greek and given a Latin translation by Leo Allatius in the seventeenth century; they are reprinted in J.-P. Migne's Patrologia Graeca vol. 141. These include his works Against Maximus Planudes and Against Manuel Moschopoulos, both of which argue that the Latin teaching that the Holy Spirit proceeds from the Father and the Son goes against neither reason nor the tradition of the Greek fathers. Another work on the same subject is titled On the Procession of the Holy Spirit; François Combefis (1605–1679), who translated a brief passage from it, claimed that it was the best thing of its kind ever written. Of this five-volume work, only two excerpts have ever been published; they are also found in Migne's P.G. vol. 141. Metochites also wrote various historical works relating to the schism of the Churches, in which he discusses the schism's origins, earlier attempts to heal it, the immediate preliminaries to the Union of Lyons, the Union's implementation in Byzantium, and the backlash against it that followed Michael VIII's death; these writings were edited by Joseph Cozza-Luzi under the title Historia dogmatica ("Dogmatic history") and published in vols. VIII and X of A. Mai's Nova Patrum Bibliotheca (Rome, 1871 and 1905). Cozza-Luzi supplied a Latin translation for Book One of this Dogmatic History; the other two books remain untranslated. A main object of Metochites' diatribes in his Dogmatic History is Patriarch Gregory II of Cyprus, who replaced Bekkos, and whom Metochites depicts as a scoundrel and a heretic.

To date, no translations of the works of George Metochites exist in any modern language. That is unfortunate, because he remains one of the main sources of historical information for the period in which he lived, and he was personally acquainted with most of the major actors in Byzantium at a critical moment of its history.

== Metochites' style ==
Leo Allatius describes Metochites' writing style in the following terms:

in omnibus dura, compositio aspera, nullo fuco, nullo lenocinio mollita, sententiæ graves, argumenta ad probandum id quod voluit firma, sed elocutione et impositione nominum horrida et confragosa.

"... [his writing is] altogether difficult, harsh in composition, softened by no false dye or meretricious adornment, with sober, somber opinions, and solid arguments for proving what he has in mind, but terrible and crabbed in his elocution and choice of words."

== Bibliography ==
- Geanakoplos, Deno John (1959). Emperor Michael Palaeologus and the West, 1258–1282: A Study in Byzantine-Latin Relations. Cambridge, Massachusetts: Harvard University Press. pp. 287–291. OCLC 1011763434.
- Laurent, M.-H. "Georges le Métochite, ambassadeur de Michel VIII Paléologue auprès d'Innocent V," in: Miscellanea G. Mercati III (Vatican 1946), 136–156.
- Laurent, M.-H. Le Bienheureux Innocent V (Pierre de Tarentaise) et son temps (Vatican City, 1947), pp. 419–443. (Contains C. Gianelli's edition of Metochites' report of his mission to Pope Gregory X.)
- Laurent, V. "Grégoire X et le projet d'une ligue antiturque," Échos d'Orient 37 (1938), 257–273.
- Loenertz, R. J. "Théodore Métochite et son père.," in: Byzantina et Franco-Graeca : series altera : articles choisis parus de 1936 à 1969 (Rome 1978), pp. 39–50.
- Loenertz, R. J. "Notes d'histoire et de chronologie byzantines: Georges Métochites à Beaucaire (automne 1275)," Revue des études byzantines 20 (1962), 177–178.
- Salaville, S. "Georges le Métochite," in: Dictionnaire de Théologie Catholique VI (Paris, 1924), cols. 1238–39.
- Sathas, K., ed. Μεσαιωνικὴ Βιβλιοθήκη I (Venice, 1872), pp. 154–193.
- Setton, Kenneth M. (1976). The Papacy and the Levant (1204–1571), Volume I: The Thirteenth and Fourteenth Centuries. Philadelphia: The American Philosophical Society. pp. )121ff. ISBN 0-87169-114-0.
