= Stephanos Sahlikis =

Stephanos Sahlikis or Sachlikis (Greek: Στέφανος Σαχλίκης; c. 1330 – after 1391) was a Cretan from Handax (Heraklion) lawyer and poet who wrote satirical poems in vernacular Greek.

His poems are written in political verse, and are the first certain instance of rhyme used in Medieval Greek (even though rhyming macaronic verse in Greek and Persian by Rumi dates to the previous century).

He wasted his inheritance and spent time in jail, all the while writing outspoken satirical poems, lampooning the mores of his time, a subject on which he had first hand experience.

== His works ==
- Aφήγησις παράξενος του ταπεινού Σαχλίκη
  - S. Papadimitriou, Stefan Sakhlikis i ego stikhotvorenie "Αφήγησις παράξενος", Odessa 1896 (from codex Neapolitanus III.) online
- Α´ Γραφαί και στίχοι και ερμηνείαι κυρού Στεφάνου του Σαχλίκη (manuscripts of Paris and Montpelier), Wagner, Carm. 62-78 (PM 1-367) and 77-8 (P 336-65), P: Parisinus gr. 2909, M: Montepessulanus 405
- Β´Γραφαί και στίχοι και ερμηνείαι, έτι και αφηγήσεις, αυτ. 79-85 (P 1-201) και 85-105 (PM 202-712)
  - W. Wagner, Carmina graeca medii aevi, Leipsig 1874 (manuscripts of Paris and Montpelier: Α΄: PM 1-367, σ. 62-78, Ρ 336-65, σ. 77-8 και Β΄: Ρ 1-201, σ. 79-85, ΡΜ 202-712, σ. 79-85)
- Παραινέσεις (manuscript Neapolitanus III. A. a. 9)
  - M. Vitti, Il poema parenetico di Sachlikis..., Κρητικά Χρονικά (Cretan Chronicles) 14, 1960, 173-200
