= John Eugenikos =

Byzantine cleric and writer (died after 1454)

John Eugenikos (Greek: Ἰωάννης Εὐγενικός, Constantinople, after 1394 – Laconia, after 1454/5) was a late Byzantine cleric and writer.

He was the brother of Mark Eugenikos, and like him an ardent opponent of the Union of the Churches. Originally a notary and nomophylax at the Patriarchate of Constantinople, his opposition to the Union saw him exiled to the Despotate of the Morea, where he died. John participated briefly in the Council of Florence that ratified the Union, and also travelled to Trebizond and Mesembria.

John Eugenikos was a prolific writer, from polemical writings attacking the Union to rhetorical ekphraseis and monodies, prayers, hymns and sermons, including an ekphrasis of Trebizond and a lament on the Fall of Constantinople. Thirty-six of his letters survive, but most of his corpus remains unpublished.

== Sources ==
- Talbot, Alice-Mary; Kazhdan, Alexander (1991). "Eugenikos, John". In Kazhdan, Alexander (ed.). The Oxford Dictionary of Byzantium. Oxford University Press. pp. 741–742. ISBN 978-0-19-504652-6.
