= Skeuophylax =

Ecclesiastical office in the Eastern Orthodox Church

Skeuophylax (Greek: σκευοφύλαξ), feminine form skeuophylakissa (σκευοφυλάκισσα), meaning "keeper of the vessels", is an ecclesiastical office in the Eastern Orthodox Church.

Usually held by a priest, the office of the skeuophylax is entrusted with looking after the sacred vessels and furnishings of a church or monastery. In Byzantine times, the skeuophylax played an important role in the liturgy, and, alongside the oikonomos or steward, administered the property of the respective church or monastery.

The skeuophylax of the Great Church (the Hagia Sophia, the cathedral church of the Patriarchate of Constantinople) was distinguished by the epithet megas ("great"), and was appointed by the Byzantine emperors until the reign of Isaac I Komnenos (r. 1057–59), when the prerogative passed to the patriarchs. Until the late 11th century, the megas skeuophylax (μέγας σκευοφύλαξ) ranked second in the administrative hierarchy, after the megas oikonomos of the Patriarchate, dropping to third place next to the megas sakellarios after that. He headed a department (sekreton) known as the mega skeuophylakeion (μέγα σκευοφυλακείον), with a number of subordinate secretaries (chartoularioi). This sekreton probably had its origins in the corps of 12 skeuophylakes (four priests, six deacons and two lectors) recorded as forming part of the staff of the Great Church in 612.

== Sources ==
- Magdalino, Paul; Talbot, Alice-Mary (1991). "Skeuophylax". In Kazhdan, Alexander (ed.). The Oxford Dictionary of Byzantium. New York and Oxford: Oxford University Press. pp. 1909–1910. ISBN 978-0-19-504652-6.
