= Synopsis Chronike (Skoutariotes) =

The Synopsis Chronike (Greek: Σύνοψις Χρονικὴ) is a 13th-century universal chronicle, from the Creation until the recapture of Constantinople by the Greeks in 1261. A. Heisenberg attributed the work to the Bishop of Cyzicus, Theodore Skoutariotes, and this identification has been generally accepted since, although it remains unverifiable.

The chronicle comprises two parts, the first, ranging from the Creation to the accession of Alexios I Komnenos in 1081, being a typical chronicle, while the second, from 1081 to 1261, is a detailed historical account. A portion of the second part consists of excerpts from Niketas Choniates and George Akropolites, but the material derived from Akropolites includes much additional information, which George Ostrogorsky wrote "give the chronicle its real value as a source." The chronicle was first edited and published by the Greek scholar Konstantinos Sathas in 1894 in his Medieval Library (Μεσαιωνική Βιβλιοθήκη) series, and is hence sometimes known as the Synopsis Sathas.

== Sources ==
- Zafeiris, Konstantinos (2010). "The Synopsis Chronike and hagiography: the presentation of Constantine the Great". In Macrides, Ruth (ed.). History As Literature in Byzantium: Papers from the Fortieth Spring Symposium of Byzantine Studies, University of Birmingham, April 2007. Ashgate Publishing. pp. 237–252. ISBN 9781409412069.
