= Mark of Ephesus =

Archbishop of Ephesus and Eastern Orthodox saint

Saint Mark of Ephesus
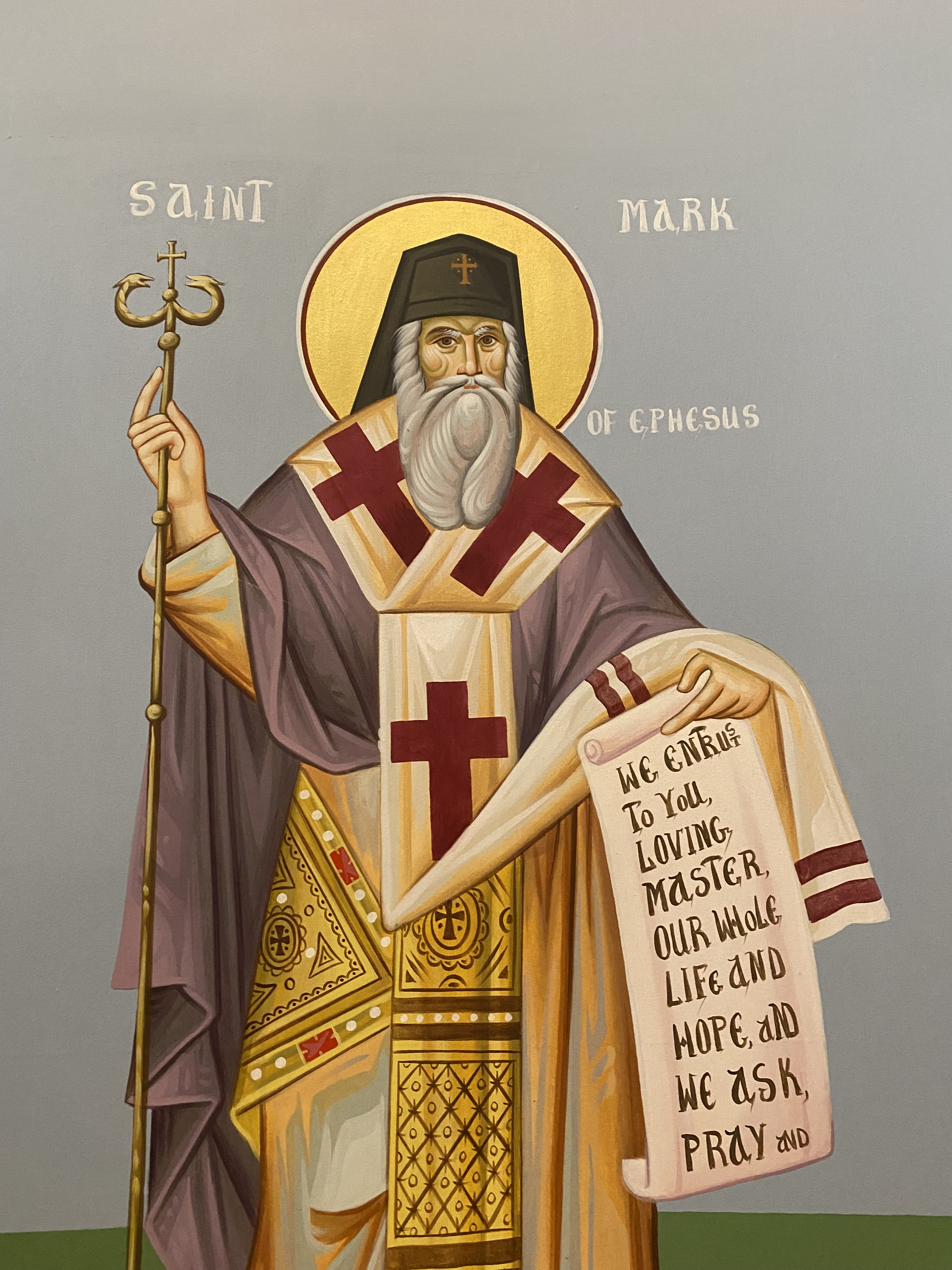
- Icon of Saint Mark in an Orthodox parish in the United States

Defender and Pillar of Orthodoxy Archbishop of Ephesus
- Born: c. 1392; Constantinople, Byzantine Empire (modern-day Istanbul, Turkey)
- Died: June 23, 1444 (age 52); Constantinople, Byzantine Empire (modern-day Istanbul, Turkey)
- Venerated in: Eastern Orthodox Church, Old Believers, Old Calendarists
- Canonized: 1734, Constantinople by Patriarch Seraphim I of Constantinople
- Major shrine: Monastery of Saint Lazarus, Galata modern day Karaköy, Turkey
- Feast: 19 January / February 1
- Attributes: Long white beard, vested as a bishop, holding a scroll in one hand and cross in the other

Mark of Ephesus (Greek: Μᾶρκος ὁ Ἐφέσιος, born Manuel Eugenikos, also called Markos Eugenikos) was a hesychast theologian of the late Palaiologan period of the Byzantine Empire who became famous for his rejection of the Council of Ferrara–Florence (1438–1439). As a monk in Constantinople, Mark was a prolific hymnographer and a follower of Gregory Palamas' theological views. As a theologian and a scholar, he was instrumental in the preparations for the Council of Ferrara–Florence, and as Metropolitan of Ephesus and delegate for the Patriarch of Alexandria, he was one of the most important voices at the synod. At the beginning of the Council, Mark was initially favorable toward accepting the union. During the commission's work, he authored several theological works, including Ten Arguments Against the Existence of Purgatory, Summa of Sayings on the Holy Spirit, Chapters Against the Latins, Confession of Faith, and On the Time of the Transubstantiation. Over this period, he distanced himself from the idea of accepting the union, concluding that the teachings of the Western Church were inconsistent with the dogmas of the Ecumenical Councils. After renouncing the council as a lost cause, Mark became the leader of the Orthodox opposition to the Union of Florence, thus sealing his reputation as a defender of Eastern Orthodoxy and pillar of the Eastern Orthodox Church.

== Early life ==
Mark was born Manuel Eugenikos in Constantinople in around 1392. His parents were George Eugenikos, sakellarios of Hagia Sophia, an Orthodox deacon, and Maria Loukas, the daughter of a devout doctor named Luke. Mark learned how to read and write from his father, who died while Mark and his younger brother John Eugenikos were still children. Maria had Mark continue his education under John Chortasmenos, who later became Metropolitan Ignatius of Selymbria, and a mathematician and philosopher by the name of Gemistus Pletho.

== Activity at the Council of Florence and aftermath ==
St. Mark of Ephesus was one of the Eastern bishops who refused to sign the agreement with the Roman Church concerning the addition of the Filioque clause during the Council of Ferrara–Florence, however, was cordial in dialogues with the Catholics. He held that the Latin Church "continued in both heresy and schism". Due to this, he has been referred to as one of the Pillars of Orthodoxy — alongside St. Photios the Great and St. Gregory Palamas. He also rejected the doctrine of Purgatory, in that he objected to the existence of a purgatorial fire that purified the souls of the faithful of their imperfections before reception of the Beatific Vision.

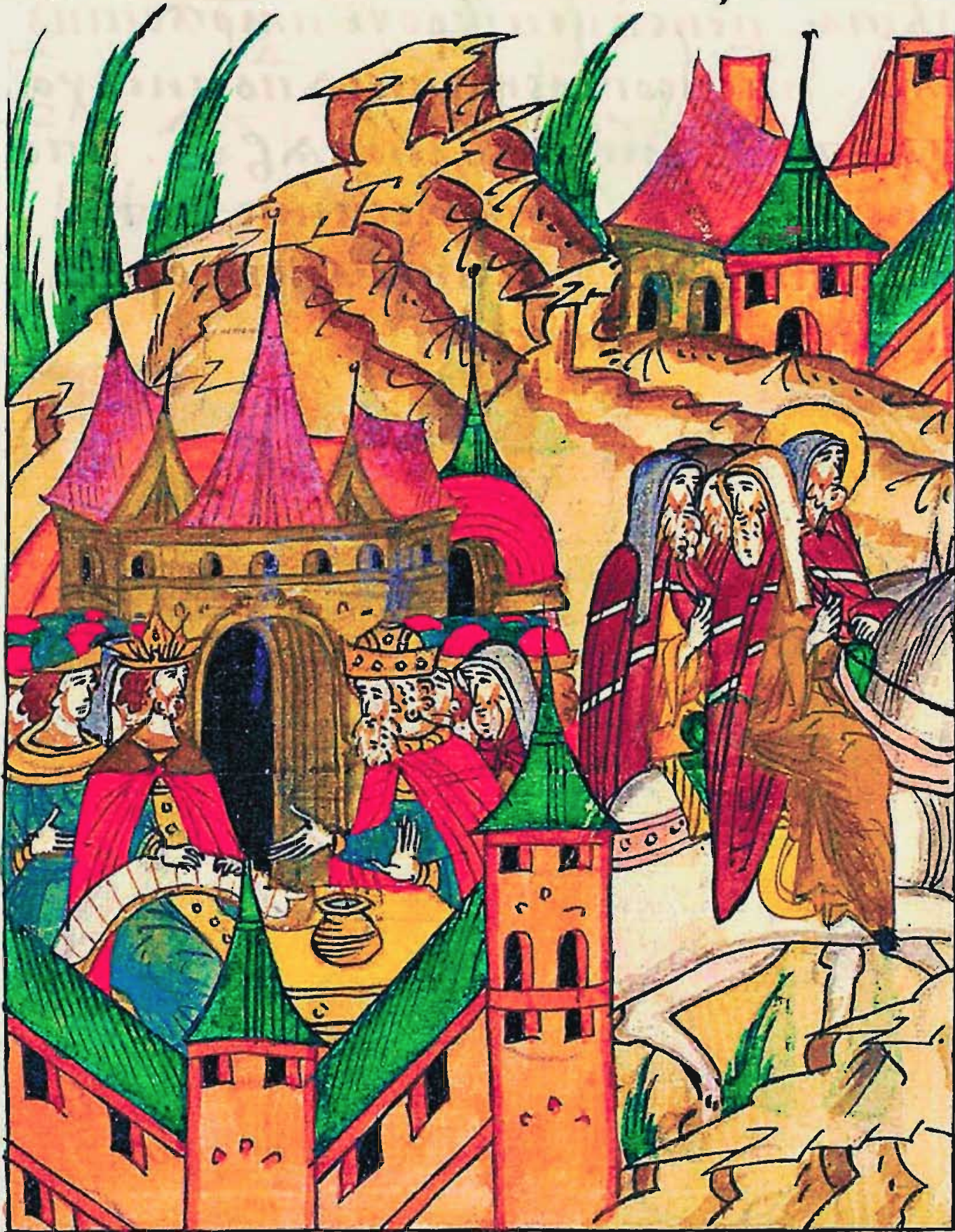
Saint Mark with Metropolitan Gregory of Iveron, Isaac of Nitria, and Sophronius of Gaza leaving Florence - Page 312 of Volume 13 of the Illustrated Chronicle of Ivan the Terrible.

== Death ==
He died at the age of 52 on June 23, 1444, after a two-week bout of intestinal illness. On his death bed, Mark implored Georgios Scholarios, his former pupil, who later became Patriarch Gennadius of Constantinople, to be careful of involvement with Western Christendom and to defend Orthodoxy. According to his brother John, his last words were "Jesus Christ, Son of the Living God, into Thy hands I commit my spirit." Mark was buried in the Mangana Monastery in Constantinople.

== Posthumous miracle and canonization ==
The Eugenikos family celebrated each anniversary of Mark's death with a eulogy consisting of a service (akolouthia) and synaxarion of a short life of Mark. Thanks in large part to Patriarch Gennadius Scholarius, veneration of Mark spread among the church. In 1734 Patriarch Seraphim I of Constantinople presided over the Holy Synod of the Church of Constantinople and solemnly glorified (canonized) Mark and added six services to the two older ones.

There is an account of a posthumous miracle performed by Mark of Ephesus. Doctors gave up on trying to save the life of the terminally ill sister of Demetrios Zourbaios, after their efforts had worsened her condition. After losing consciousness for three days she suddenly woke up, to the delight of her brother, who asked her why she woke up drenched in water. She related that a bishop escorted her to a fountain and washed her and told her, "Return now; you no longer have any illness." She asked him who he was and he informed her, "I am the Metropolitan of Ephesus, Mark Eugenikos." After being miraculously healed, she made an icon of Saint Mark and lived devoutly for another 15 years.

== Legacy ==
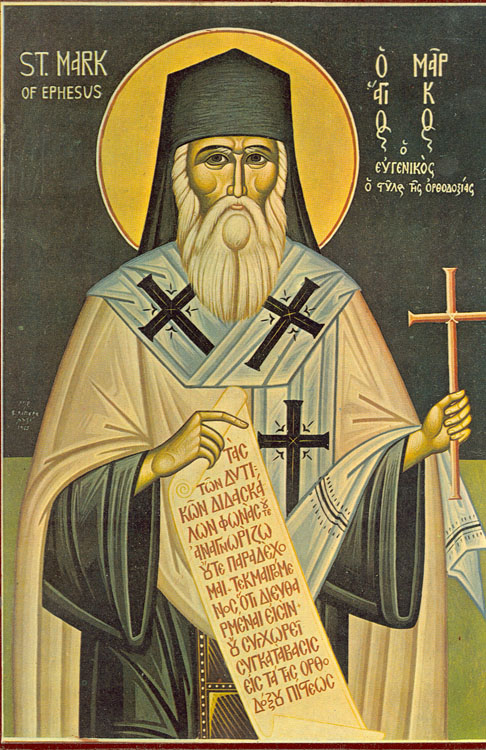
Icon of Saint Mark of Ephesus

The Orthodox Church considers Mark of Ephesus a saint, calling him, together with Photius the Great and Gregory Palamas, a Pillar of Orthodoxy. Nikodimos of the Holy Mountain, in his service to the saint, called him "the Atlas of Orthodoxy". His feast day is January 19, the day his relics were moved to the monastery of Lazarus in Galata.

Studies of Mark of Ephesus thought are important in modern relations between Catholics and Eastern Orthodox with Fr Kappas on the Catholic side noting that Mark of Ephesus was known for displaying a great deal of charity and respect toward the Latins during the tense debates at the Council of Florence.

== Theology ==
Mark's theological output was extensive and covered a wide range of genres and topics typical of monastic writers.

=== Hymnography ===
Mark composed a wealth of poetic texts honoring God and the saints, many of which were intended for use in a liturgical setting. In addition to canons and services to Jesus Christ, the Mother of God, and the angels, Mark honored his favorite Fathers of the Church: Gregory Palamas, John Damascene, Symeon Metaphrastes, along with a wealth of more ancient saints. Additionally, Mark composed verses celebrating the lives and achievements of his heroes, such as Joseph Bryennios.

=== Hesychasm ===
Mark was a devoted disciple of Gregory Palamas. Throughout his life he composed several treatises in defense of the essence–energies distinction, and he defended the unique contributions of Hesychast theology in the face of charges of innovation.

=== Dogmatic/polemical theology ===
One of Mark's most important theological contributions was his opposition to the Roman Catholic Filioque. At the Council of Florence, the examination of this controversy had both text-critical and exegetical dimensions, as the participants debated the authenticity of sources, the precision of grammatical constructions, and the canon of authoritative patristic texts. Mark had played an early role in the gathering of manuscripts, and his contested readings at the synod have not been vindicated for their precision and accuracy.

During the Council of Florence Mark made strong arguments against the Latin use of the word Filioque. His responses to the Latins included classifying suspect texts as corrupted or a forgery.

When considering Mark's opponent Bessarion, note Bessarion's rewards: Pope Eugene IV invested him with the rank of cardinal at the consistory of 18 December 1439 and his fellow humanist Aeneas Silvius Piccolomini, then Pius II, gave him the purely ceremonial title of Latin Patriarch of Constantinople in 1463.

Echoing centuries of polemic, going back to Photius, the debates surrounding the Filioque admitted resonances of more recent discussions, such as those of John Bekkos and Gregory of Cyprus. In the end, Mark could not concede that the Holy Spirit proceeds from the Son as well as the Father, even by using the Orthodox phrase of "through the Son," since Mark considered this to be an equivocation in light of the obvious theological disagreements between East and West. For Eugenikos, the Holy Spirit proceeds only from the Father, and the phrase "through the Son" did not express anything like the theology of the Filioque.

=== Anthropology ===
Mark's criticism of the doctrine of Purgatory, the other major topic at Florence, involved him in questions relating to the nature of the human composite. Basing himself on Palamite conceptions of man, Mark articulated a theory of the human person rooted in Christology and Orthodox doctrines of Creation. Mark's discourses at Florence are, in this regard, supplemented by writings which he produced in response to the Platonism of Gemisthus Plethon, who preached a radical identification of the human person with the soul, to the detriment of embodied life.

=== Latin influences ===
The Palaiologan period in which Mark lived witnessed the translation of the works of Thomas Aquinas into Greek, an event whose repercussions have yet to be fully documented and expounded. In spite of remaining ambiguities, though, it has become increasingly clear that the Hesychasts were not unaware of Latin theology.

Some scholars have hypothesized that Mark adopts Thomas Aquinas' hylomorphism in his defense of the Resurrection, and that he experiments with arguments from Thomas Aquinas' Summa contra Gentiles in order to argue for the concomitance of mercy in God's condemnation of unrepentant sinners to hell. "Further, Eugenicus' treatise Peri anastaseôs (ed. A. SCHMEMANN, "Une œuvre inédite de St Marc d'Éphèse: Peri anastaseôs", in: Theología 22 (1951): 51–64; text on pp. 53–60) is merely a defence of the rational possibility of the doctrine of resurrection and a rational refutation of some philosophical objections against it based almost entirely on Thomas Aquinas' description of the natural unity of the human soul with the body in explicitly hylomorphic and anti-Platonic terms (see Summa contra Gentiles IV,79–81; cf. Vat. gr. 616, ff. 289r–294v)." Also, eminent Eastern Orthodox scholars have already suggested that, during Mark's courteous and apologetic period of preparation for the Council of Florence, the Ephesine explicitly omitted condemnations of Aquinas by name, even if his two "Antirrhetics against Manuel Kalekas" contained condemnation of Thomistic Trinitarian theology, especially Thomas' implicit rejection of the essence–energies distinction and the Thomas' assertion that Aristotelian "habits" were very similar to the charisms or the Holy Spirit (e.g., Faith, Hope, & Charity). What is more, Mark had a great love for Augustine of Hippo, spending money at Florence to buy manuscripts of the same. In fact, at Florence he copiously cites Augustinian and Ps.-Augustinian works approvingly as an authority in favor of the Eastern Orthodox position. Finally, Mark was savvy enough to understand Bernard of Clairvaux's writings from an unknown translation (likely through his former pupil Scholarius). He used Bernard to argue for the Palamite position on the beatific vision. In effect, Mark of Ephesus' liberal use of Latin authorities paved the way for the fuller synthesis of his pupil Gennadius Scholarius after his master's death.

Even if Mark was initially zealous for the "divine work of union" (τὸ θεῖον ἔργον τῆς εἰρήνης καὶ ἑνώσεως τῶν ἐκκλησιῶν) in his opening speech to Pope Eugene IV, Mark was disgusted at the Latin efforts and plots to prevent him from reading the acts of the Ecumenical Councils aloud, wherein the canons prohibited additions to the Nicene Creed. The Latins and Greeks had different opinions over what was more important to address first. That is, the addition to the creed and the orthodoxy of the filioque clause itself. Mark Eugenikos and the Greeks leaning to the former (although Bessarion of Nicaea had reservations about this and preferred to debate the dogma itself so as to avoid the Greek party becoming dispirited in the event the Latins emerge victorious in a debate over the addition to the creed) and Latins preferring a debate over the orthodoxy of the clause itself deeming that should the orthodoxy of the filioque be demonstrated, the Greeks would have no credible reason to oppose its inclusion in the creed.

At the beginning of the council, in the same opening speech, Mark noted that two issues alone were necessary to overcome the historical divisions between the Latin and Greek Churches; namely, (1.) The issue of the Filioque or Latins' assertion that the Father and the Son are conjointly a cause of the Holy Spirit, and (2.) the issue of unleavened bread, whereby the Latins were judged to have historically abandoned the orthodox (vs. Armenian) practice of using leavened bread for the sake of azymes. Because Mark found reasons to reject uniquely Latin authorities, councils, and texts unavailable in Greek or unapproved by jointly canonical synods, he became increasingly exasperated at Latin proofs from the Saints and Doctors that Mark fell back on claiming that everything was forged and corrupted as already noted above.

In the end, Mark refused to sign the council documents following a debate with John of Montenero, who claimed that there was a difference in the dignity of persons in the Father, Son, and Holy Spirit. This had the effect of convincing Mark that the Thomists were subordinationists since Montenero was willing to defend a distinction in the persons according to "dignity" (dignitas or axiôma).

Unsurprisingly, Mark concentrated on anti-Latin propaganda by recourse to differences that were most obvious to the simple Greek populace. For example, he noted that the Latins had no throne reserved for their hierarch in the sanctuary, the Latin priests shaved their faces "like women celebrating Mass," and various other minutiae. In this, Mark did not ignore various abstractions of metaphysics, yet he was more realistic and practical in his apologetics and an excellent propagandist. Therefore, one must read Mark's post-Florentine and anti-Latin propaganda through the optic of Mark's ends. Even if Mark dissented from Florence for traditional, theological motives he was quick to cite practical differences that emphasized the gulf between Latins and Greeks.

== Hymns ==
Hymns as recorded by the Orthodox Church in America:

Apolytikion (Tone 4)

By your profession of faith, O all-praised Mark
The Church has found you to be a zealot for truth.
You fought for the teaching of the Fathers;
You cast down the darkness of boastful pride.
Intercede with Christ God to grant forgiveness to those who honor you!

Kontakion (Tone 3)

Clothed with invincible armor, O blessed one,
You cast down rebellious pride,
You served as the instrument of the Comforter,
And shone forth as the champion of Orthodoxy.
Therefore we cry to you: "Rejoice, Mark, the boast of the Orthodox!"
