= Constantine Meliteniotes =

Greek ecclesiastical writer

Constantine Meliteniotes (Greek: Κωνσταντῖνος Μελιτηνιώτης, fl. 1240s – 2 April 1307) was a Greek ecclesiastical writer in the Byzantine Empire and a prominent supporter of the Union of Lyons between the Greek Orthodox Church and the Roman Catholic Church. He is best known as one of the two archdeacons of Patriarch John XI Bekkos who, together with him, were imprisoned and exiled in the years following the breakdown of the union; he remained under house arrest until his death.

== Life ==
Constantine Meliteniotes' surname implies that he had ancestral roots in the city of Melitene in southeast Anatolia. No precise information exists as to the place or date of his birth, but he speaks of himself as a native Byzantine, so one may assume that he was born either in Constantinople or in the Empire of Nicaea on the Asian side of the Bosporus. One recent study would date Meliteniotes' birth to between the years 1240 and 1250; another study suggests that he had, as a teacher, George Akropolites. Constantine Meliteniotes came from a fairly prominent Byzantine family; a number of men bearing his surname are known from late Byzantium, including the fourteenth-century writer Theodore Meliteniotes who, like Constantine, served as an archdeacon. Nevertheless, Constantine had no children; apparently he never married.

In June 1270, Constantine Meliteniotes was sent by Byzantine emperor Michael VIII Palaiologos (r. 1259–1282) on an embassy to King Louis IX of France, together with the then-chartophylax John Bekkos. The purpose of the embassy was to induce Louis to persuade his brother, Charles of Anjou, king of Sicily, to call off a planned assault upon Constantinople, which Michael VIII had recently recaptured from the Latins (1261). Louis was at that time outside the walls of Tunis, fighting a crusade against the Moslems; after a dangerous voyage, the two ambassadors reached Carthage on 3 August, and delivered to Louis gifts and a letter from the Byzantine emperor; when, finally, on 24 August 1270, they were granted an audience with the French king, Louis promised to do what he could to create better relations between Michael and his brother, but he in fact could do nothing, because he died the next day of dysentery; the Greek ambassadors had to sail home empty-handed.

Meliteniotes was an enthusiastic supporter of the Emperor Michael's plans for union with the Church of Rome from the start (unlike Bekkos, who initially opposed these plans, but later changed his mind). The historians George Pachymeres and George Metochites represent Meliteniotes as one of the main backers and publicists of Michael's unionist policy in the years leading up to the Second Council of Lyons; both of them also testify that an important collaborator with Meliteniotes during those years was George of Cyprus, who later, as Patriarch Gregory II, reinvented himself as a staunch opponent of union. Seven early letters by Gregory the Cypriot are addressed to Meliteniotes, testifying to the friendship that had once existed between the men.

When John Bekkos became patriarch in the year 1275, Meliteniotes succeeded him as chartophylax, even while retaining his positions as archdeacon of the palace clergy and protekdikos of the Great Church in Constantinople (a position which placed him at the head of an ecclesiastical tribunal which had authority over those who, for one reason or another, sought asylum at Hagia Sophia). In 1277, along with George Metochites and the Metropolitan of Cyzicus, Theodore Skoutariotes, he was sent on an embassy to Rome, where proofs were being sought of the Byzantine Church's adherence to the terms of the Union; Bekkos entrusted his own synodal letter to Pope John XXI to Meliteniotes, to be delivered by him personally.

When Michael VIII Palaiologos died in December 1282, his son and successor, Andronikos II Palaiologos (r. 1282–1328), renounced the ecclesiastical union; during the early part of the year 1283, at a series of impromptu synods presided over, first, by monks and the unconscious Joseph I, then later by the new patriarch, Gregory II, unionist clergy — in particular the patriarch Bekkos and his two archdeacons Meliteniotes and George Metochites, but others as well — were deprived of their ecclesiastical dignities and publicly humiliated. Meliteniotes and Metochites were shut up at the monastery of the Pantokrator at Constantinople until 1285, when, together with Bekkos, they appeared before their accusers at the Second Synod of Blachernae. This synod was one of the major theological events of late Byzantine times; some scholars regard it as having formulated the definitive Orthodox response to the doctrine of the Filioque. At this synod, Meliteniotes and the other unionists defended their accommodation with the West; they argued that it was in keeping with patristic ideas, which view the Son as an active mediator of the Holy Spirit's eternal procession. Gregory of Cyprus, by contrast, argued that patristic texts that speak of the Holy Spirit being "through the Son" have to be interpreted to mean, not "through" in the sense of receiving existence, but "through" in the sense of manifestation. After the synod, Gregory II wrote a Tome that enshrines this teaching; much of Constantine Meliteniotes' subsequent writing was devoted to refuting the doctrine of this Tome and discrediting its author.

After the Synod of Blachernae, Meliteniotes, along with Bekkos and Metochites, was exiled to a fortress on the southern shore of the Gulf of Nicomedia, the fortress of St. Gregory (perhaps located near the present-day town of Karamürsel). After Bekkos's death there in 1297, Meliteniotes and Metochites returned to Constantinople; Meliteniotes was kept in confinement at the imperial palace until his death in 1307.

== Writings ==
Two discourses by Constantine Meliteniotes, written during the time of the Union and in support of the theses that the Holy Spirit proceeds through and from the Son, were edited by Leo Allatius in the seventeenth century, with a Latin translation (in Latin they are titled: De ecclesiastica unione Latinorum et Graecorum, et de processione Spiritus Sancti per Filium); they were reprinted in the nineteenth century by J.-P. Migne in his Patrologia Graeca, vol. 141, cols. 1032 C - 1273 C. Sometime between the years 1285 and 1289, Meliteniotes also wrote two discourses against Gregory the Cypriot's Tome and its doctrine of an eternal manifestation; they were edited by Markos Orphanos and published in Athens in 1986. None of his writings have been translated into English.

== Bibliography ==
- Alexopoulos, Theodoros. "Constantine Melitiniotes and Photios of Constantinople on the Filioque. A Comparative Study." Studia Patristica 50 (2011), 289–300.
- Alexopoulos, Theodoros. Der Ausgang des Thearchischen Geistes. Eine Untersuchung der Filioque-Frage anhand Photios' Mystagogie des Hl. Geistes, Konstantins Melitiniotes' Zwei Antirrhetici und Augustins De Trinitate (Göttingen 2009).
- Huculak, Jacek Benedykt, OFM. Graeca indoles doctrinae Constantini Meliteniotae de processione Spiritus sancti ex Patre Filioque (diss., Rome 1989).
- Huculak, Benedykt, OFM. Bohaterski teolog greckokatolicki – Konstantyn Meliteniotes [in Polish = The heroic Greek-Catholic theologian, Constantine Meliteniotes] (1997).
- Krumbacher, Karl, ed. Geschichte der byzantinischen Literatur (527-1453) (Munich 1897), pp. 97–98.
- Metochites, George. Historia dogmatica, liber I. In: Mai and Cozza-Luzi, eds., Novae Patrum Bibliothecae … Tomus Octavus. In parte ii., Georgii Metochitae diaconi Historiae Dogmaticae librum I et II (Rome 1871).
- Orphanos, Markos A. Κωνσταντίνου Μελιτηνιώτου Λόγοι ἀντιρρητικοὶ δύο, νῦν τὸ πρῶτον ἐκδιδόμενοι (editio princeps) (Athens 1986).
- Spourlkaos, A., art. "Κωνσταντῖνος ὁ Μελιτηνιώτης" in A. Martinos, ed., Θρησκευτικὴ καὶ Ἠθικὴ Ἐγκυκλοπαιδεία, vol. 8 (Athens 1966), cols. 43–44.
