= Manuel Holobolos =

Byzantine monk (1245-1310s)

Manuel Holobolos (Greek: Μανουὴλ Ὁλόβολος; c. 1245 – 1310/14) was a Byzantine orator and monk, who was a leading opponent of the Union of the Churches in the reign of Michael VIII Palaiologos (r. 1259–1282).

== Biography ==
Holobolos entered the service of Michael VIII as a grammatikos in his teens, and composed several orations for the early years of Michael's reign that are an important primary source. In 1261, however, when Michael ordered the blinding and imprisonment of the legitimate emperor, John IV Laskaris (r. 1258–1261), Holobolos expressed public grief. As punishment for this, Holobolos' lips and nose were mutilated. Holobolos then retired from public service, and became a monk at the Prodromos Monastery in Constantinople, with the monastic name Maximos.

In 1265/66, through the intervention of Patriarch Germanus III, Holobolos was able to get a post as a teacher, possibly at the orphanage of the Church of St. Paul. Because of his fervent anti-Unionism, he was exiled to the Megalou Agrou monastery on the Sea of Marmara in 1273, and was not allowed to return to the capital until after Michael's death, when his son and successor Andronikos II Palaiologos (r. 1282–1328) repudiated the Union. Thus Holobolos participated in the Council of Blachernae in 1285, which formally condemned the Union, and was restored to imperial favour: he received the title of rhetor and became protosynkellos by 1299.

According to one of his students, George Galesiotes, he continued teaching until his death, sometime between 1310 and 1314. John Pediasimos was also among his students.

== Sources ==
- Macrides, R.J. (1991). "Holobolos, Manuel". In Kazhdan, Alexander (ed.). The Oxford Dictionary of Byzantium. Oxford and New York: Oxford University Press. p. 940. ISBN 0-19-504652-8.
