= John Chortasmenos =

Byzantine monk and erudite (c. 1370 – before June 1439)

John Chortasmenos (Greek: Ἰωάννης Χορτασμένος; c. 1370 – 1436/37) was a Byzantine monk and bishop of Selymbria, who was a distinguished bibliophile, writer, and teacher.

== Life ==
Chortasmenos is first attested as a notary of the patriarchal chancery in 1391. He continued to occupy this position until c. 1415. At some point he became a monk, with the monastic name Ignatios. Eventually he was raised to metropolitan bishop of Selymbria, a post he held by 1431.

== Work ==
An ardent bibliophile, Chortasmenos is notable both as a writer as well as a teacher, counting scholars Mark of Ephesus, Bessarion and Gennadius Scholarius among his pupils. He was the author of philological, historical and philosophical works, as well as at least 56 surviving letters to various literati and to Emperor Manuel II Palaiologos; his philosophical works show a great variety in the use of ancient sources and the forms he adopted. He wrote a hagiography of Constantine the Great and Helena of Constantinople, commentaries on John Chrysostomos and Aristotle, a treatise on hyphenation, as well as poems.

It has been suggested that he wrote a historical work, now lost, covering the period between the end of the history of Emperor John VI Kantakouzenos and the early 15th century, when the historians who wrote after the Fall of Constantinople started their works with. Herbert Hunger attributed to him an anonymous account of the Ottoman siege of Constantinople in 1394–1402, but this was rejected by Paul Gautier.

== Library ==
At least 24 surviving manuscripts are known to have belonged to Chortasmenos' library. Among the more notable is the Juliana Anicia Codex of Dioscurides, which he had restored, rebound, and a table of contents and extensive scholia added in Byzantine Greek minuscule in 1406. Beside the same problem in Diophantus' manuscript next to which Fermat would later write his famous marginalia (Fermat's Last Theorem), Chortasmenos wrote, "Thy soul, Diophantus, be with Satan because of the difficulty of your other theorems and particularly of the present theorem." In 2013, Italian Philologist and historian of Mathematics Fabio Acerbi showed that Chortasmenos wasn't cursing Diophantus because of the same passage next to which Fermat wrote his theorem (II.8), but because of the far more difficult II.7.

== Bibliography ==
- Acerbi, F. (2013). "Why John Chortasmenos sent Diophantus to the Devil". Greek, Roman and Byzantine Studies. 53: 379–389. ISSN 0017-3916 – via library.duke.edu.
- Cacouros, M. (1994). "Un commentaire byzantin inédit au deuxième livre des Seconds Analytiques, attribuable à Jean Chortasménos". Revue d'Histoire des Textes. 24 (1994): 149–198. doi:10.3406/rht.1994.1405.
- Cacouros, M. (1999–2000). "Philologie grecque". Livret-Annuaire de l'École Pratique des Hautes Études, Sciences Historiques et Philologiques. 15 (132): 84–86.
- Cacouros, M. (2021). "Pratiques de la citation et techniques codicologiques dans l'œuvre logique de Chortasménos". In Cacouros, M.; Sautel, J.-H. (eds.). Des cahiers à l'histoire de la culture à Byzance. Hommage à Paul Canart, codicologue (1927-2017). Leiden: Peeters. pp. 49–80. doi:10.2307/j.ctv2tjdgcg.7. ISBN 978-90-429-4682-8.
- Herrin, J. (2013). Margins and Metropolis: Authority across the Byzantine Empire. Princeton University Press. ISBN 978-1400845224.
- Hunger, H. (1969). Johannes Chortasmenos (ca. 1370-ca. 1436/37). Briefe, Gedichte und Kleine Schriften. Einleitung, Regesten, Prosopographie, Text. Wiener Byzantinische Studien 7 (in Greek and German). Vienna: H. Böhlau.
- Janick, J.; Stolarczyk, J. (2012). "Ancient Greek illustrated Dioscoridean herbals: origins and impact of the Juliana Anicia Codex and the Codex Neopolitanus". Notulae Botanicae Horti Agrobotanici Cluj-Napoca. 40 (1): 9–17. Bibcode:2012NBHAC..40....9J. doi:10.15835/nbha4017767.
- Talbot, A.-M. (1991). "Chortasmenos, John". In Kazhdan, Alexander (ed.). The Oxford Dictionary of Byzantium. Oxford and New York: Oxford University Press. pp. 431–432. ISBN 0-19-504652-8.
