= Sakellarios =

Official title

A sakellarios (Greek: σακελλάριος) or sacellarius is the title of an official entrusted with administrative and financial duties (cf. sakellē or sakellion, "purse, treasury") in a government or institution. The title was used in the Byzantine Empire with varying functions and the title remains in use in the Eastern Orthodox Church.

== Civil administration ==
The first known sakellarios was a certain Paul, a freedman appointed by Emperor Zeno (reigned 474–491). Hence, the sakellarios usually is presumed to have headed a sakellion (or sakella, sakelle), a term that appears in early Byzantine sources with the apparent sense of "treasury", more specifically of "cash", as opposed to the vestiarion that was for goods.

Despite the origin of the term, the sakellarioi of the early Byzantine period (fifth–seventh centuries) are not directly associated with financial matters. Rather they appear connected with the imperial bedchamber (koiton), bearing court titles such as spatharios or koubikoularios, while some holders of the office were entrusted with distinctly non-financial tasks: Emperor Heraclius (r. 610–641) appointed the sakellarios Theodore Trithyrius to command against the Arabs, and yet another sakellarios conducted the examination of Maximos the Confessor under Constans II (r. 641–668).

It is only in the early eighth century that sakellarioi are directly mentioned as treasurers. By the time of the Taktikon Uspensky of c. 843, the sakellarios had become a general comptroller of the fiscal bureaux (the sekreta), with notaries reporting to the office holder in each department. The head of the sakellion department from this period on became the chartoularios tou sakelliou.

From the late eleventh century, the prefix megas ("grand") was added to it. The post continues in evidence until at least 1196, although for a time, it may have been subsumed into that of the megas logariastes under Alexios I Komnenos (r. 1081–1118).

== Ecclesiastical administration ==
Imitating the practice of the imperial court, the Patriarchate of Constantinople had its own sakellion. Like the office holder's secular counterpart, the patriarchal sakellarios lost its function as treasurer. By the late eleventh century the ecclesiastic official took over the supervision of donations to, and the administration of, the monasteries of Constantinople. At the same time, it also acquired the prefix megas and replaced the megas skeuophylax as the second-most important official of the patriarchate. By the thirteenth century, the institution of megas sakellarios had been replicated in the provincial sees as well.

== Sources ==
- Bury, John B. (1911), The Imperial Administrative System of the Ninth Century. With a Revised Text of the Kletorologion of Philotheos, Oxford University Publishing
- Kazhdan, Alexander, ed. (1991). The Oxford Dictionary of Byzantium. Oxford University Press. ISBN 978-0-19-504652-6.
