= First Steps (painting) =

Painting by Georgios Jakobides

- First Steps (English)
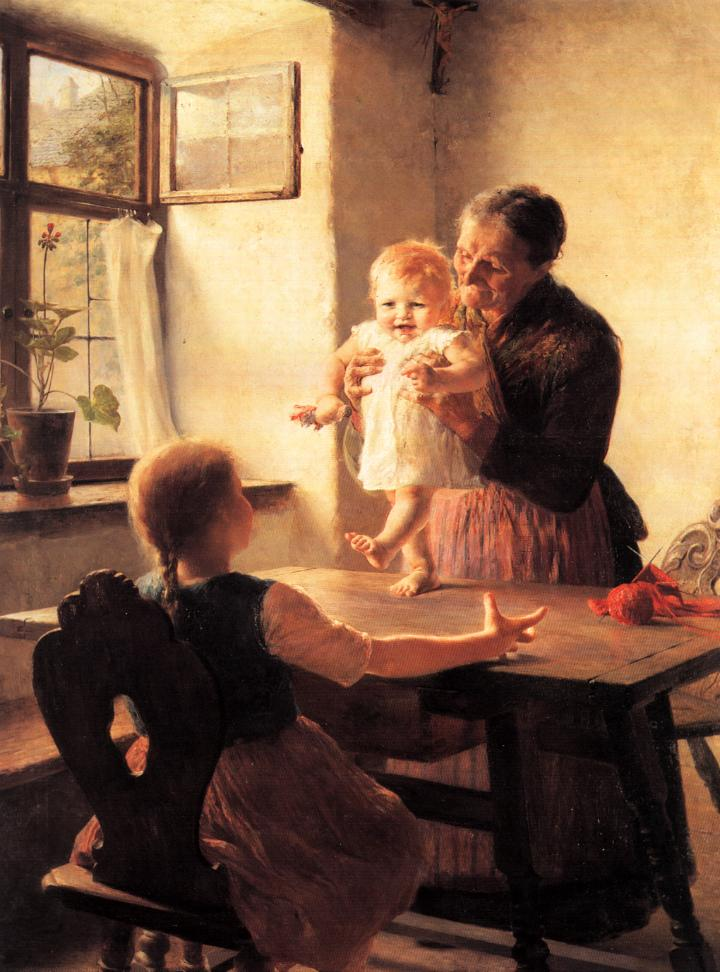
- Artist: Georgios Jakobides
- Year: 1889 and 1893
- Medium: Oil on canvas

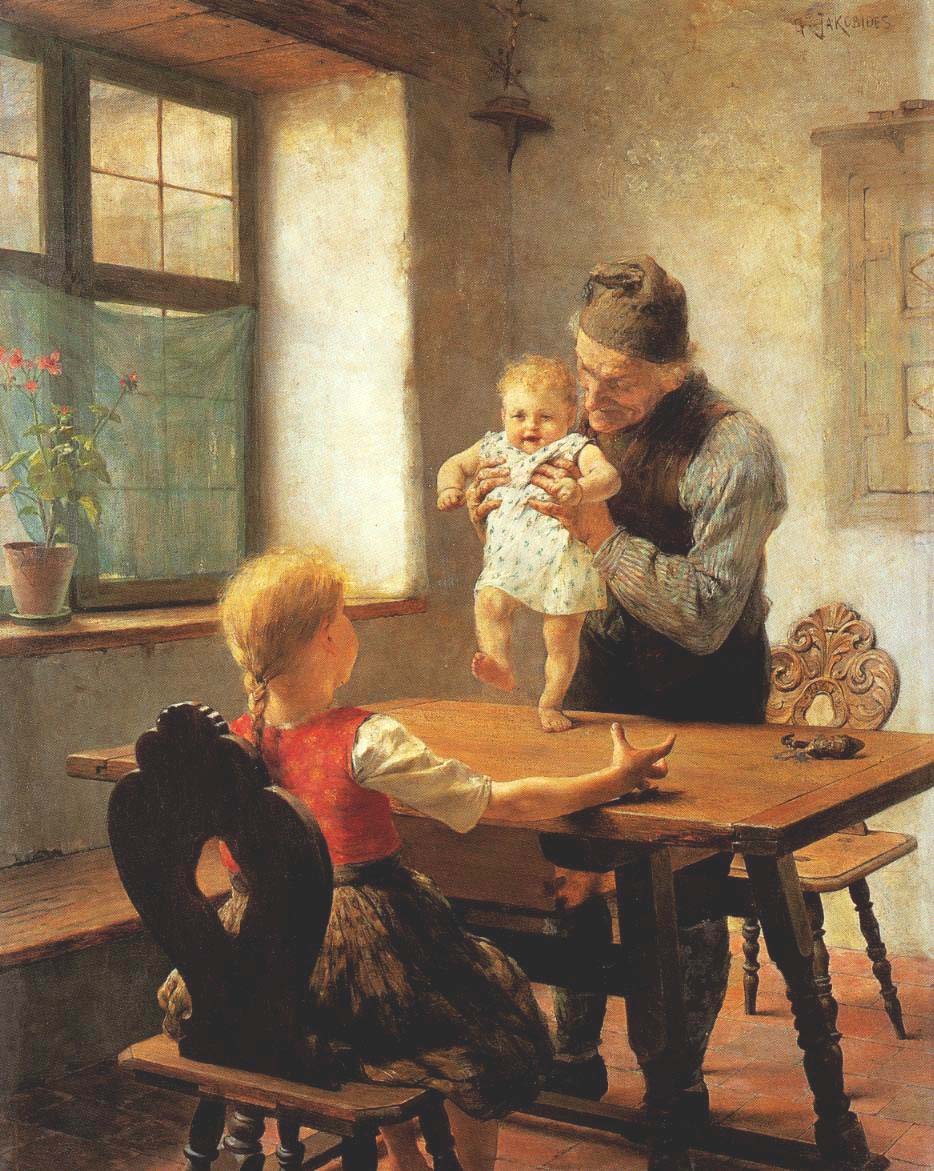
The first version

First Steps (German: Erste Schritte, Greek: Τα πρώτα βήματα) is an 1893 oil painting by Georgios Jakobides, one of the main representatives of the Greek artistic movement of the Munich School.

It was painted in two versions and painted on Realism style on painting genre. Both versions show a scene in a typical traditional Bavarian house.

The first version shows a grandfather helping his granddaughter for her first steps. The scene is set in a Bavarian village home interior, bathed in the light pouring through the open window. Dressed in dark cherry tones, the grandmother is holding the blond baby, full of courage and smiling, taking its first steps in the world, on top of a wooden table. The grandmother has left her red knitwear in a corner. The baby's elder sister, seated with her back towards the foreground, is waiting to receive the baby with her arms open in a protective gesture. First shown at the Glaspalast exhibition in Munich in 1892, this painting marks a key change in Iakovidis' work regarding his interpretation of light. The natural light floods the scene as it comes through the window, adding vibrancy and ambiance.

The painting shows in the second version a grandmother helping her granddaughter for her first steps. It also features an elder sister watching her younger sister's first steps. This version was completed in 1893.
