= Bertram Currier =

American musician (1874–1934)

- Birth name: Bertram Herbert Currier
- Born: August 10, 1874
- Died: May 10, 1934 (aged 59); Newton, Massachusetts, United States
- Genres: Classical
- Occupation: Musician
- Instruments: Cello
- Formerly of: Boston Symphony Orchestra

Bertram Herbert Currier (August 10, 1874 – May 10, 1934) was an American musician.

Currier's father was the American artist Joseph Frank Currier (1843–1909) and his mother was Abbey Currier (née Appleton). Currier was a distant relative of Nathaniel Currier, the 19th century lithographer. Currier played cello with the Boston Symphony Orchestra for many years. He led an orchestra and string quartet during the Boston's off season.

Bertram's wife, Olga (née Brandenburg), majored in piano and graduated from the New England Conservatory of Music. Both were composers and music teachers, and operated a family music school in Newton, Massachusetts. They had five children, including singer/actress Jane Morgan.

Bertram Currier died on May 10, 1934, aged 59, in Newton, Massachusetts.
