= Joseph Frank Currier =

American painter

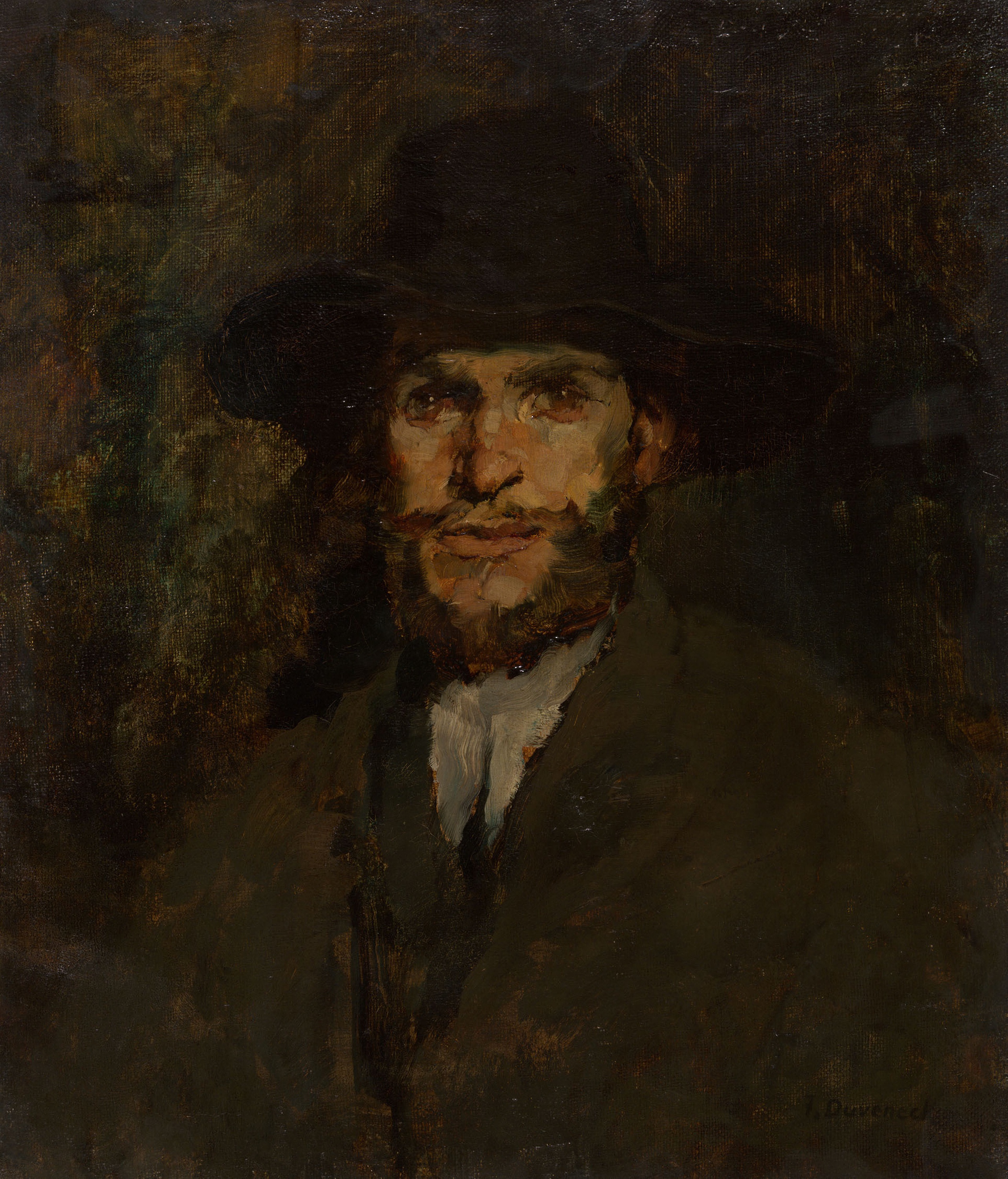
- Portrait of Currier by Frank Duveneck
- Born: 1843; Boston, Massachusetts, U.S.
- Died: 1909 (aged 65–66); Waltham or Waverley, Massachusetts, U.S.
- Occupation: Painter
- Relatives: Bertram Currier (son)

Joseph Frank Currier, also known as J. Frank Currier, (1843–1909) was an American painter from Boston, Massachusetts. He was associated with the Munich School, and a co-founder of the Society of American Artists. He committed suicide by jumping in front of a train. His work is in the collections of the Brooklyn Museum, the Cincinnati Art Museum, the Harvard Art Museums, the Philadelphia Museum of Art, and the Smithsonian American Art Museum.

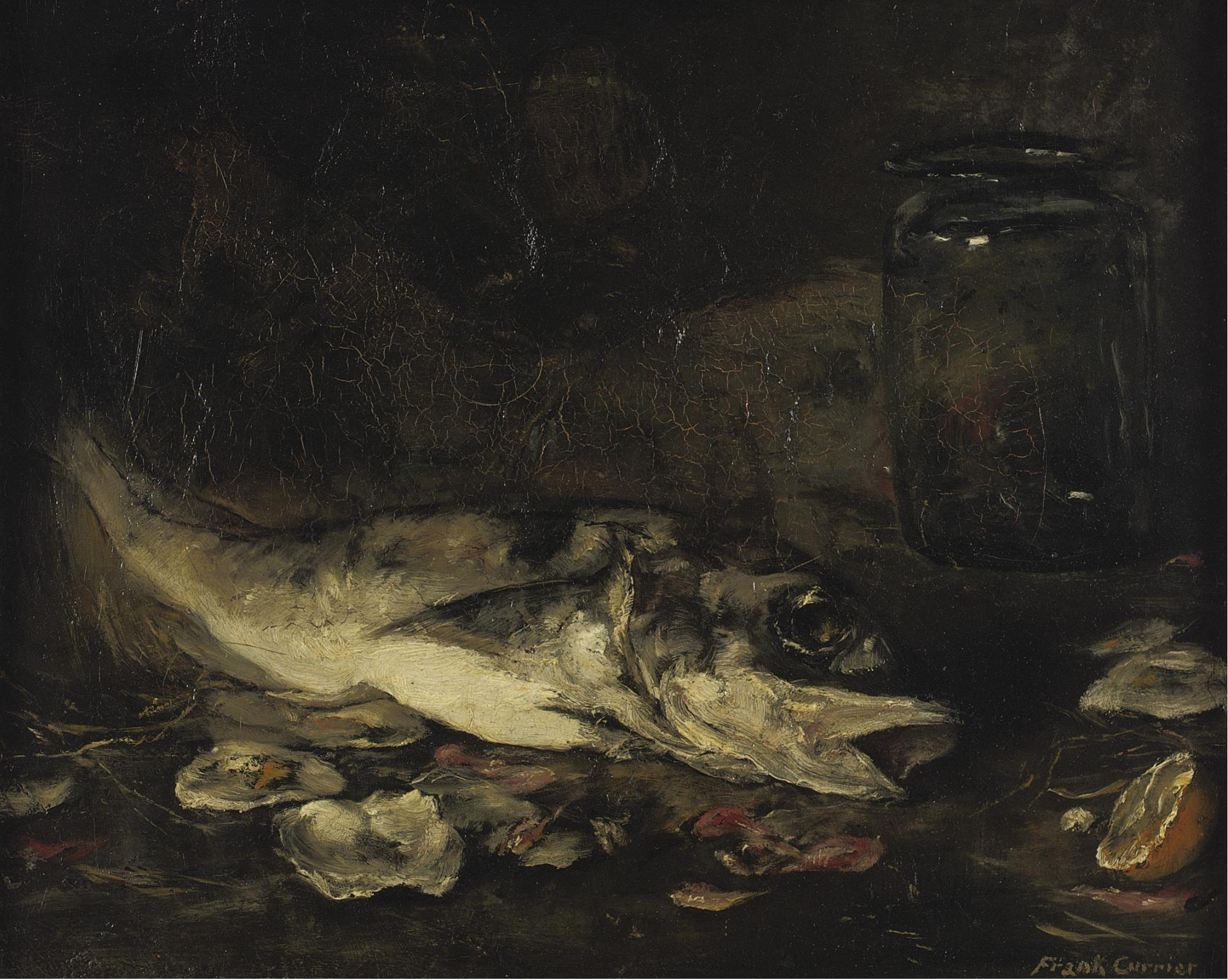
Still life with fish and oranges.
