= Jane Morgan =

American singer (1924–2025)

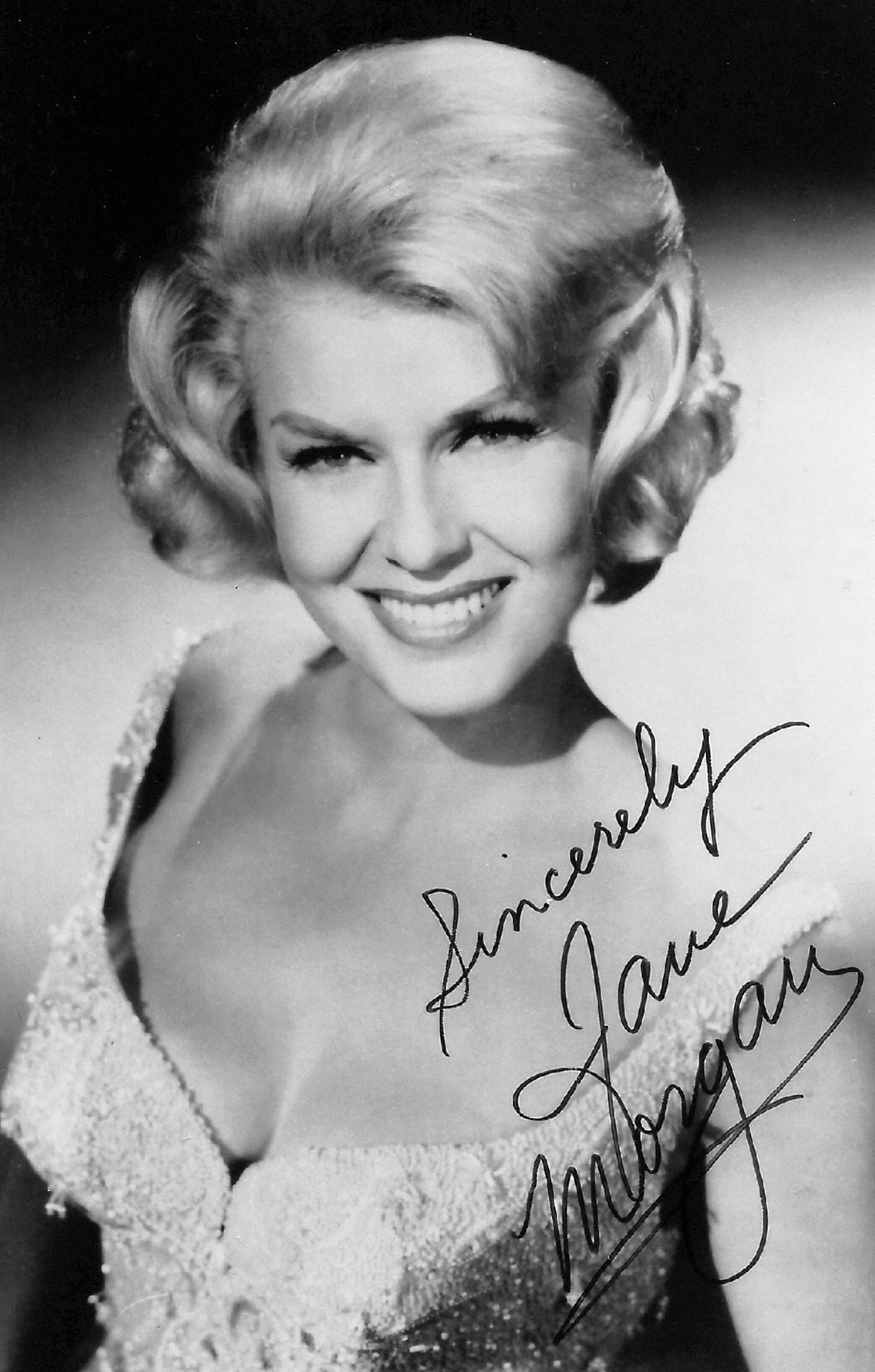
- An August 1969 photo of Morgan, which was signed for television host Mike Douglas
- Born: Florence Catherine Currier; May 3, 1924; Newton, Massachusetts, U.S.
- Died: August 4, 2025 (aged 101); Naples, Florida, U.S.
- Education: Juilliard School of Music
- Occupations: Singer; actress; night club/cabaret performer; television personality
- Years active: 1943–2009
- Spouses: Larry Stith (m. 1959; div. 1964) Jerry Weintraub (m. 1965, separated 1980s)
- Children: 4 (1 step-son)
- Musical career
- Genre: Traditional pop
- Labels: Kapp; Epic; RCA Victor; Decca; Polydor; Parlophone

Florence Catherine Currier (May 3, 1924 – August 4, 2025), known professionally as Jane Morgan, was an American singer and recording artist of traditional pop. Morgan initially found success in France and the UK before achieving recognition in the US, receiving six gold records. She was a frequent nightclub and Broadway performer, and also appeared numerous times on American television, both as a singer and as a dramatic performer.

== Early life ==
Morgan was born in Newton, Massachusetts, on May 3, 1924. She was one of five children born to musicians Olga (Brandenburg) and Bertram Currier. At five she began vocal lessons while continuing piano lessons. During the summers, she took on child roles and appeared in theater productions at the Kennebunkport Playhouse in Kennebunkport, Maine, which her brother, Robert Currier, had founded.

In 1941, she was the Treasurer of the Kennebunkport Playhouse. After graduating from Seabreeze High School, she was accepted into New York's Juilliard School of Music. Intending to become an opera singer, she studied opera by day and performed whenever possible.

== Early career ==
Morgan sang popular songs in nightclubs and small restaurants, and at bar mitzvahs and other private parties, to help pay her tuition expenses at Juilliard. Orchestra leader Art Mooney changed her name to Jane Morgan by taking the first name of one of his vocalists, Janie Ford, and the last name of another, Marian Morgan.

In 1948, French impresario Bernard Hilda selected her to accompany him to Paris. Morgan became a sensation in Paris. Many French songwriters, including Charles Trenet, frequented the club, and they wrote several songs that became hit recordings for Morgan. Morgan and Hilda soon opened a new weekly hour-long television show and she began recording in 1949 on the French Polydor label as well as Parlophone, Philips, and others. She returned to Europe in 1954 to appear in a London West End review with comedian Vic Oliver, and later at the Savoy Theatre and London Palladium.

== American success ==
Morgan left her agent and began singing at Lou Walters' Latin Quarter in New York. Walters kept Morgan at the Latin Quarter for a year, when she was noticed by Dave Kapp, who had recently founded a new recording label, Kapp Records. Kapp signed Morgan to a recording contract, and near that same period he signed pianist Roger Williams.

To counter her reputation as a French singer, Kapp had Morgan record "Baseball, Baseball", and her first album release was titled The American Girl from Paris. She recorded several additional albums and soon was paired with Williams, who had gained national acceptance with his recording of "Autumn Leaves". They recorded "Two Different Worlds", which gave Morgan her first significant airplay on US radio. In 1957 Kapp brought The Troubadors, a virtually unknown group of five musicians, to his studio. They had appeared in Love in the Afternoon. Kapp asked Morgan to join The Troubadors and sing "Fascination". Although written in 1904 by F. D. Marchetti as "Valse Tzigane", the song was modified in Paris at the Folies Bergère as a "strip" number. With English lyrics added by Dick Manning in 1932, it had been played throughout the 1957 movie (the French lyric had been created in 1942). Her recording was released in late 1957 and remained on the charts for 29 weeks.

In 1958, Kapp released "The Day the Rains Came" (a French song by Gilbert Bécaud called "Le jour où la pluie viendra") with Morgan singing in English on one side and in French on the other. It reached number one in the UK Singles Chart in early 1959. She was featured on the 10 November 1959, jazz special, Timex-All-Star Jazz III.

== Middle years ==
Morgan performed in musicals on the stage and Broadway. She appeared in Can-Can, The King and I, Kiss Me, Kate, Gentlemen Prefer Blondes, Bells Are Ringing, Anniversary Waltz, Affairs of State, Hello, Dolly and others.

Morgan's agent died in 1959 and her new manager, Jerry Weintraub, was able to obtain bookings for her in many noted US venues. Morgan divorced Larry Stith in 1964 and married Weintraub, more than a decade her junior, in 1965; Weintraub had a son, Michael, from his first marriage, and he and Morgan adopted three daughters. Morgan and Weintraub separated in the 1980s, but never divorced. Weintraub died in 2015.

In 1960, she recorded the English-language version of an Italian song, Romantica.

== Later years ==
After Morgan performed on Broadway, she said, "Being on Broadway was one of the most exciting things in my life because I had always dreamed of it".

Morgan's two final albums were for RCA Records: her last LP, Jane Morgan in Nashville, yielded two moderate hits on the country music charts, including her answer to Johnny Cash's song, "A Boy Named Sue", titled "A Girl Named Johnny Cash" (written by comic Martin Mull). She performed the song on Cash's eponymous television series in early 1971.

The only other time Morgan had recorded without formal arrangements was on her hit single, "Fascination"; nevertheless, she was reportedly dubbed "The Countryest Girl in Nashville" by the crew. She retired from performing in 1973, but appeared occasionally over the years at special events and benefits. She worked as a production assistant to her husband (producer Jerry Weintraub) on films including the remake of Ocean's Eleven.

On December 10, 2009, Morgan performed at the UNICEF Ball honoring her husband, Jerry Weintraub, held at the Beverly Wilshire Hotel, singing "Ten Cents a Dance" and "Big Spender". Known as Jane Weintraub, she divides her time between Malibu, California, Palm Springs, California and Kennebunkport, Maine. She owned Blueberry Hill Farm in Kennebunkport, Maine from 1958.

Morgan's collection of her unique performance gowns spanning from the 1950s to the 1980s were exhibited to the public for the first time, premiering at the Brick Store Museum in Kennebunk, Maine, in February 2022.

Morgan celebrated her 100th birthday on May 3, 2024. She died at her home in Naples, Florida on August 4, 2025, at age 101.

== Notable associates ==
Morgan performed for French President Charles de Gaulle, and for five U.S. Presidents: John F. Kennedy, Richard Nixon, Gerald Ford, Jimmy Carter, and George H. W. Bush. She toured with Jack Benny and John Raitt, and appeared at the Grand Ole Opry; two of her RCA singles hit the Billboard country charts in 1970.

== Television appearances ==
Morgan made her U.S. television debut on Celebrity Time in 1951. Her early television credits include The Victor Borge Show, The Colgate Comedy Hour, Cavalcade of Stars, The Jack Benny Program, The Jimmy Dean Show, The Jonathan Winters Show, The Mike Douglas Show, and The Hollywood Palace, as well as more than fifty appearances on The Ed Sullivan Show.

Morgan appeared in such television specials as Highways of Melody 1961; The Bell Telephone Hour: A Trip to Christmas (1961); The Bell Telephone Hour: Christmas Program (1965); The Bell Telephone Hour: Masterpieces and Music (1966); Coliseum (1967); Kraft Music Hall: Broadway's Best (1969) and Operation: Entertainment (1969).

She starred in three of her own television specials: The Jane Morgan Hour (1959); Voice of Firestone: An Evening in Paris (1959), and The Jane Morgan Show (1968), and made several dramatic television appearances, including The Web: Rehearsal for Death (1952); Peter Gunn: Down the Drain (1961); and It Takes a Thief: The Suzie Simone Caper (1970).

Morgan's version of "If Only I Could Live My Life Again" was featured during the closing credits of the second season finale of Apple TV's The Morning Show which was released November 19, 2021.

On May 6, 2011, Morgan received the 2,439th star on the Hollywood Walk of Fame.

== Discography ==
=== Singles ===
Year	Title	Label and Number	Peak positions			
Year	Title	Label and Number	US Pop	US AC	US Country	UK Singles Chart
1946	"Quel est ce rossignol?" / "Hey! Ba-ba re bop" (with Bernard Hilda Orchestra in London)	Columbia R 14566 C 655	-	-	-	-
1946	"Cement Mixer (Put-Ti, Put-Ti)" / "Le temps qu'une hirondelle " (with Bernard Hilda Orchestra in London)	Columbia R 14567	-	-	-	-
1947	"Gipsy" / "Quisiera Saber" (with Bernard Hilda Orchestra in London)	Columbia R 14582	-	-	-	-
1947	"Maria de Bahia" / "Dreaming of You" (with Bernard Hilda Orchestra in London)	Columbia R 14583	-	-	-	-
1948	"Debut d'une aventure" / "Mam'selle" (with Bernard Hilda Orchestra in London)	Columbia R 14673	-	-	-	-
1949	"C'est Tout" / "J'aurais Bien Donne Dix Ans De Ma Vie" (with Bernard Hilda Orchestra in London)	Decca 9141	-	-	-	-
1950	"Mon blond" / "Les feuilles mortes" (with Bernard Hilda Orchestra in London)	Decca RF 17010	-	-	-	-
1950	"La Raspa" / "Comme on est bien dans tes bras" (with Bernard Hilda Orchestra in London)	Decca RF 20.837	-	-	-	-
1950	"Woody Woodpecker" / "Nature Boy" (with Bernard Hilda Orchestra in London)	Polydor 560109	-	-	-	-
1953	"April in Portugal" / "If I Were a Bell" (with Philip Green Orchestra in London)	Parlophone 3699	-	-	-	-
1953	"Say You're Mine Again" / "Send My Baby Back To Me" (with Philip Green Orchestra in London)	Parlophone 3713	-	-	-	-
1953	"Eyes of Blue" / "The Kissing Tree" (with Philip Green Orchestra in London)	Parlophone 3720	-	-	-	-
1953	"Forgive Me" / "The Donkey Song" (with Philip Green Orchestra in London)	Parlophone 3762	-	-	-	-
1954	"Baseball, Baseball" / "Fairweather Friends"	Kapp 104	-	-	-	-
1954	"Why" / "The Heart You Break"	Kapp 107	-	-	-	-
1955	"I Try To Forget You" / "Why Don't They Leave Us Alone"	Kapp 111	-	-	-	-
1955	"Flyin' High" / "Give Me Your World"	Kapp 115	-	-	-	-
1955	"In Paree" / "Take Me Away"	Kapp 121	-	-	-	-
1956	"Let's Go Steady" / "Take Care" (With The Jones Boys)	Kapp 140	-	-	-	-
1956	"La Ronde" / "Midnight Blues"	Kapp 148	-	-	-	-
1956	"Two Different Worlds" / "Nights in Verona" (with Roger Williams)	Kapp 161	41	-	-	-
1957	"From The First Hello to the Last Goodbye" / "Come Home"	Kapp 172	-	-	-	-
1957	"It's Not For Me to Say" / "Around the World in Eighty Days"	Kapp 185	-	-	-	-
1957	"Fascination" / "Whistling Instrumental" (with The Troubadors)	Kapp 191	7	-	-	-
1957	"It's Been a Long, Long Time" / "I'm New at The Game of Romance" (Canadian hit(#44))	Kapp 200	-	-	-	-
1958	"Only One Love" / "I've Got Bells in My Heart"	Kapp 214	-	-	-	-
1958	"Enchanted Island" / "Once More My Love Once More"	Kapp 221	-	-	-	-
1958	"The Day The Rains Came" / "Le Jour Ou La Pluie Viendra" (Sung in French)	Kapp 235	21	-	-	1
1958	"You'll Never Walk Alone" / "I May Never Pass This Way Again"	Kapp 236	-	-	-	-
1958	"To Love And Be Loved" / "If Only I Could Live My Life Again"	Kapp 253	-	-	-	27
1959	"Love Is Like Champagne" / "To Each His Own"	Kapp 264	-	-	-	-
1959	"With Open Arms" (#31CAN)/ "I Can't Begin to Tell You"	Kapp 284	39/113	-	-	-
1959	"I'm in Love" / "Was It Day, Was It Night"	Kapp 304	-	-	-	-
1959	"Happy Anniversary" / "C'est La Vie C'est L'Amour"	Kapp 305	57	-	-	-
1960	"My Love Doesn't Love Me at All" / "The Bells of St. Mary's"	Kapp 317	-	-	-	-
1960	"The Bells of St. Mary's" / "Ballad of Lady Jane"	Kapp 317	-	-	-	-
1960	"I Am A Heart" / "Romantica"	Kapp 332	-	-	-	39
1960	"Lord And Master" / "Where's The Boy (I Never Met)"	Kapp 351	-	-	-	-
1960	"Somebody" / "The Angry Sea"	Kapp 358	-	-	-	-
1961	"In Jerusalem" / "In Jerusalem" (French version)	Kapp 369	115	-	-	-
1961	"Love Makes The World Go Round" / "He Makes Me Feel I'm Lovely"	Kapp 390	-	-	-	-
1961	"Homesick For New England" / "It Takes Love"	Kapp 418	-	-	-	-
1961	"Blue Hawaii" / "Moon River"	Kapp 431	-	-	-	-
1962	"Forever My Love" / "What Now My Love"	Kapp 450	-	-	-	-
1962	"Ask Me to Dance" / "Waiting For Charley to Come Home"	Kapp 478	-	-	-	-
1963	"Bless 'Em All" / "Does Goodnight Mean Goodbye?"	Colpix 713	131	-	-	-
1964	"The Last Time I Saw Paris"	Colpix 469	-	-	-	-
1964	"From Russia with Love" / "The Song from Moulin Rouge"	Colpix 727	-	-	-	-
1964	"C'est si bon" / "Once Upon a Summertime"	Colpix 734	-	-	-	-
1964	"Dominique" / "Funny World"	Colpix 754	-	-	-	-
1964	"Poor People of Paris" / "Funny World"	Colpix 755	-	-	-	-
1965	"After the Fall" / "Oh How I Lie"	Colpix 761	-	-	-	-
1965	"Maybe" / "Walking the Streets in the Rain"	Epic 9819	-	-	-	-
1965	"Side by Side" / "Till I Waltz Again with You"	Epic 9847	-	25	-	-
1965	"Little Hands" / "Everyone Come to My Party"	Epic 9881	-	-	-	-
1966	"I Will Wait for You" / "Love Me True"	Epic 10012	-	-	-	-
1966	"1-2-3" / "Kiss Away"	Epic 10032	135	16	-	-
1966	"Elusive Butterfly" / "Good Lovin'"	Epic 10058	-	9	-	-
1966	"Kiss Tomorrow Goodbye" / "Now and Forever"	Epic 10113	121	30	-	-
1967	"The Three Bells" / "I Want to Be With You"	Epic 10159	-	-	-	-
1967	"Somebody Someplace" / "This Is My World Without You"	ABC 10969	-	24	-	-
1967	"I Promise You" / "Him's a Dope"	ABC 11002	-	27	-	-
1967	"The Marvelous Toy" / "Smile"	ABC 11024	-	-	-	-
1968	"Masquerade" / "Smile"	ABC 11034	-	-	-	-
1968	"A Child" / "My Funny Valentine"	ABC 11054	-	39	-	-
1968	"Look What You've Done to Me" / "There's Nothing Else in My Mind"	ABC 11092	-	-	-	-
1969	"Marry Me! Marry Me!" / "Three Rest Stops"	RCA 74-0153	-	-	-	-
1969	"Traces" / "Where Do I Go?"	RCA 74-0194	-	-	-	-
1969	"Congratulations, I Guess" / "All of My Laughter"	RCA 47-9727	-	-	-	-
1970	"A Girl Named Johnny Cash" / "Charley" (US Country hit)	RCA 47-9839	-	-	61	-
1970	"The First Day" / "I'm Only a Woman" (US Country hit)	RCA 47-9901	-	-	70	-
1970	"He Gives Me Love" / "He's Never Too Busy"	RCA 74-0316	-	-	-	-
1971	"Jamie Boy" / "Things of Life"	RCA 74-0395	-	-	-	-

=== Albums (original vinyl) ===
No.	Year	Album title	Peak positions		Label and Album Number
No.	Year	Album title	US BB	US CB	Label and Album Number
1	1956	The American Girl from Paris	—	—	KAPP 1023
2	1957	Fascination	13	14	KAPP 1066
3	1958	All the Way	—	—	KAPP 1080
4	1958	Something Old, Something New, Something Borrowed, Something Blue	—	—	KAPP 1089
5	1958	Jane Morgan (repackage of The American Girl from Paris)	—	—	KAPP 1093
6	1958	The Day the Rains Came	—	—	KAPP 1105
7	1958	Chante Pour Ses Amis Canadiens	—	—	KAPP 801
8	1959	Jane in Spain	—	—	KAPP 1129
9	1959	Great Songs from Great Shows of the Century	—	—	KAPP 5006
10	1959	Broadway in Stereo	—	—	KAPP 3001
11	1960	Jane Morgan Time (Compilation of singles)	—	—	KAPP 1170
12	1960	The Ballads of Lady Jane	—	—	KAPP 1191
13	1961	The Second Time Around	—	—	KAPP 1239
14	1961	Great Golden Hits (Compilation)	—	—	KAPP 1246
15	1961	Big Hits from Broadway	—	—	KAPP 1247
16	1961	Love Makes the World Go 'Round	—	—	KAPP 1250
17	1962	At the Cocoanut Grove	—	—	KAPP 1268
18	1962	More Golden Hits (Compilation)	—	—	KAPP 1275
19	1962	What Now My Love?	—	—	KAPP 1296
20	1963	Greatest Hits (Compilation)	—	—	KAPP 1329
21	1963	Serenades the Victors	—	—	COLPIX 460
22	1964	More Greatest Hits (Compilation)	—	—	KAPP 1372
23	1964	The Last Time I Saw Paris	—	—	COLPIX 469
24	1965	In My Style	—	—	EPIC 24166
25	1965	Jane Morgan in Gold – Today’s Hits…Tomorrow’s Golden Favorites	—	97	EPIC 24190
26	1966	Jane Morgan Album	—	—	COLPIX 497
27	1966	Fresh Flavor	134	—	EPIC 24211
28	1967	Kiss Tomorrow Goodbye	—	—	EPIC 24247
29	1968	A Jane Morgan Happening	—	—	ABC 638
30	1969	Marry Me! Marry Me!	—	—	RCA Victor LSO-1160
31	1969	Traces of Love	—	—	RCA Victor LSP-4171
32	1970	In Nashville	—	—	RCA Victor LSP-4322

- This list does not include re-releases.

=== Albums (CD) ===
Year	Album title	Label and Album Number
1990	Jane Morgan – Greatest Hits	Curb Special Markets B000000CYA
1998	Fascination: The Jane Morgan Collection	Varèse Sarabande B00000151D
2000	In My Style/Fresh Flavor	Collectables B0000523PI
2001	Fascination	Polygram Int'l B00005HPV7
2007	An American Songbird in Paris	Sepia Recordings B000ULQVAM
2008	Jane Morgan Sings Showstoppers	Sepia Recordings B001E1BOAE
2008	The American Girl From Paris Jane Morgan	Time Records, Spain B0025LX6X0
2009	Fascination: The Ultimate Collection	Jasmine Music B001NH4CAS
2009	Jane Morgan Sings Popular Favorites	Sepia Recordings B001QEIHWM

== See also ==
- List of artists who reached number one on the UK Singles Chart
