= Munich school =

German art movement

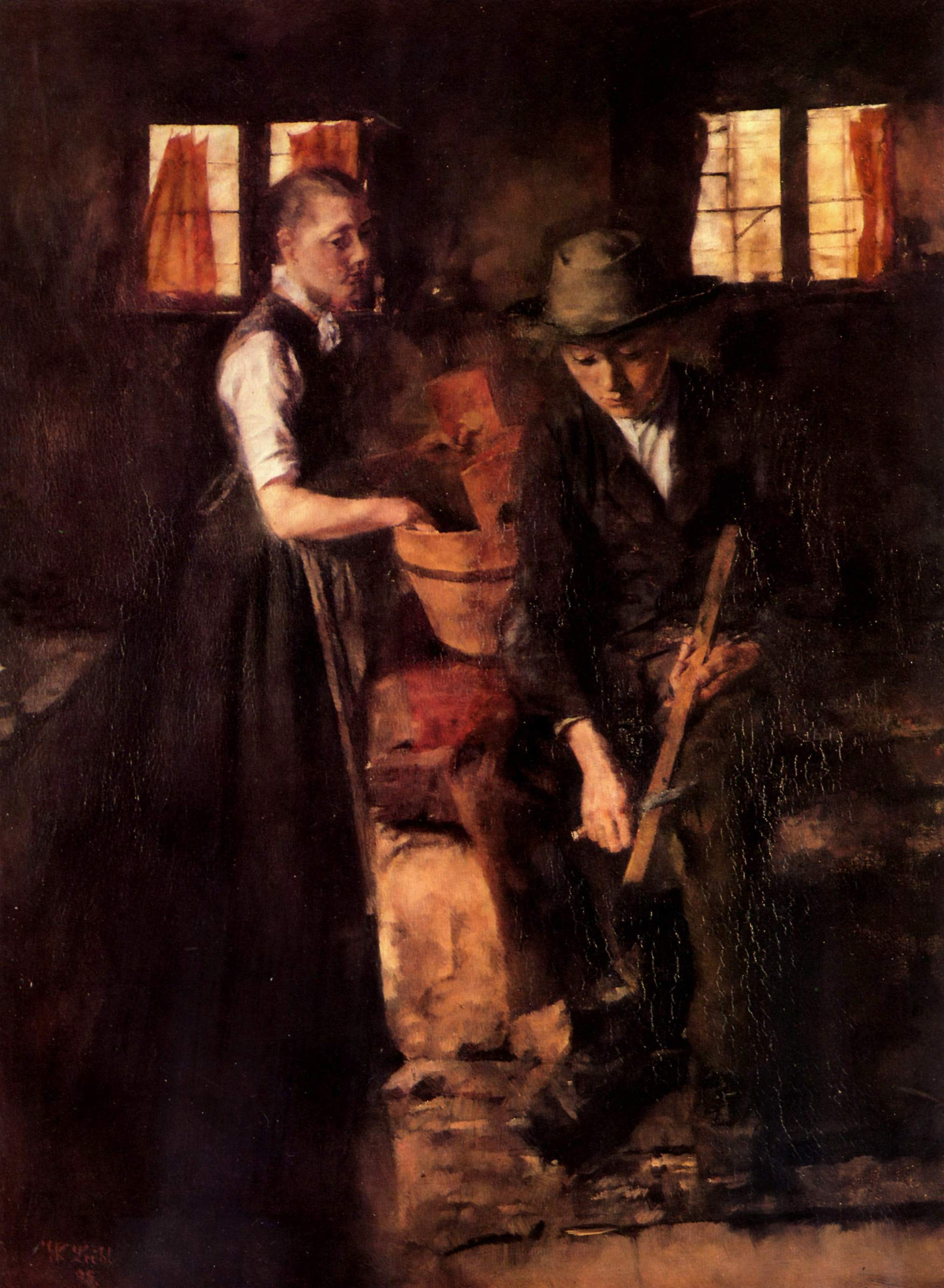
Wilhelm Leibl, In der Kueche II, 1898, oil on canvas, 84 cm × 64.5 cm (33.1 in × 25.4 in), Cologne, Wallraf-Richartz Museum

The Munich school (Greek: Σχολή του Μονάχου) is a group of painters who worked in Munich or were trained at the Royal Academy of Fine Arts of Munich (German: Münchner Akademie der Bildenden Künste) between 1850 and 1918. In the second half of the 19th century the Academy became one of the most important institutions in Europe for training artists and attracted students from across Europe and the United States.

== History and representative artists ==
Munich was an important center of painting and visual art in the period between 1850 and 1914. During this period the Munich Academy became the leading art school in Germany, eclipsing the Düsseldorf School. The mid-century movement away from the Romanticism and emphasis on fresco painting of the earlier Munich school was led by Karl von Piloty, who was a professor at the Munich Academy from 1856 and became its director in 1874. Piloty's approach to history painting was influenced by the French academician Paul Delaroche, and by the painterly colorism of Rubens and the Venetians. Besides Piloty, other influential teachers at the Academy were Wilhelm von Diez (1839–1907), Wilhelm von Kaulbach, Arthur von Ramberg and Nikolaos Gyzis.

Artists of the Munich school include Anton Braith, Alfred Kowalski, Hans Makart, Gabriel Max, Victor Müller, Fritz Osswald, Franz von Lenbach, Friedrich Kaulbach, Wilhelm Leibl, Wilhelm Trübner, and the genre painters Franz Defregger, Eduard von Grützner, Hermann von Kaulbach and Miroslav Kraljević.

The last generation of students of the Munich school included nearly all the major figures of the German avantgarde, such as Lovis Corinth, Ernst Oppler, Vassily Kandinsky, Paul Klee and Franz Marc.

== Beyond Bavaria ==
There were notable schools of Munich-trained painters active outside of Germany. The formative influence of teachers and examples of the Munich school shaped the academic naturalism in many European countries, e.g. the Greek academic art of the 19th century. Due to the historical affinity between Bavaria and Greece—Prince Otto I was from 1832 to 1862 the first King of Greece—many Greek artists were trained in Munich. The Munich school in Greek art is the most important artistic movement of Greek Art in the 19th century with strong influences from the Academy of Munich. Among the leading artists of this school were Konstantinos Volanakis, Georgios Roilos, Nikolaos Gyzis, Polychronis Lembesis, Nikolaos Vokos, Nikiphoros Lytras and Georgios Jakobides.

Most of the artists of the Hungarian Nagybanya school of art, such as Gyula Aggházy, were educated at the Academy of Fine Arts, Munich.

Poland was represented by, among others, Józef Chełmoński, Józef Brandt, Władysław Czachórski, Julian Fałat, Aleksander Gierymski, Maksymilian Gierymski and Alfred Wierusz-Kowalski.

The Swedish painters Johan Christoffer Boklund and Johan Fredrik Höckert studied at the Academy of Fine Arts, Munich.

The founder of historical painting in Armenia, Vardges Sureniants, was a representative of the Munich school.

Frank Duveneck and William Merritt Chase were the most prominent exemplars of the Munich school in American art. Joseph Frank Currier "figured prominently in the Munich school" with "exceptional power and originality". Other American artists who studied at the Academy of Fine Arts, Munich, include Harry Chase, Robert Koehler, John Henry Twachtman, Paul E. Harney, Joseph Dwight Strong, Frederick Dielman, Lawrence Carmichael Earle, Reginald Bathurst Birch, Richard Lionel De Lisser, and Walter Shirlaw.

== Style ==
The Munich school is characterized by a naturalistic style and dark chiaroscuro. Painters such as Wilhelm Leibl found inspiration in "an intense study of nature and of the Dutch masters in the old old Pinakothek", and by the work of their French contemporary Gustave Courbet. Typical subjects are landscape, portraits, genre, still-life, and history painting.
