= Alfred Kowalski =

Polish painter

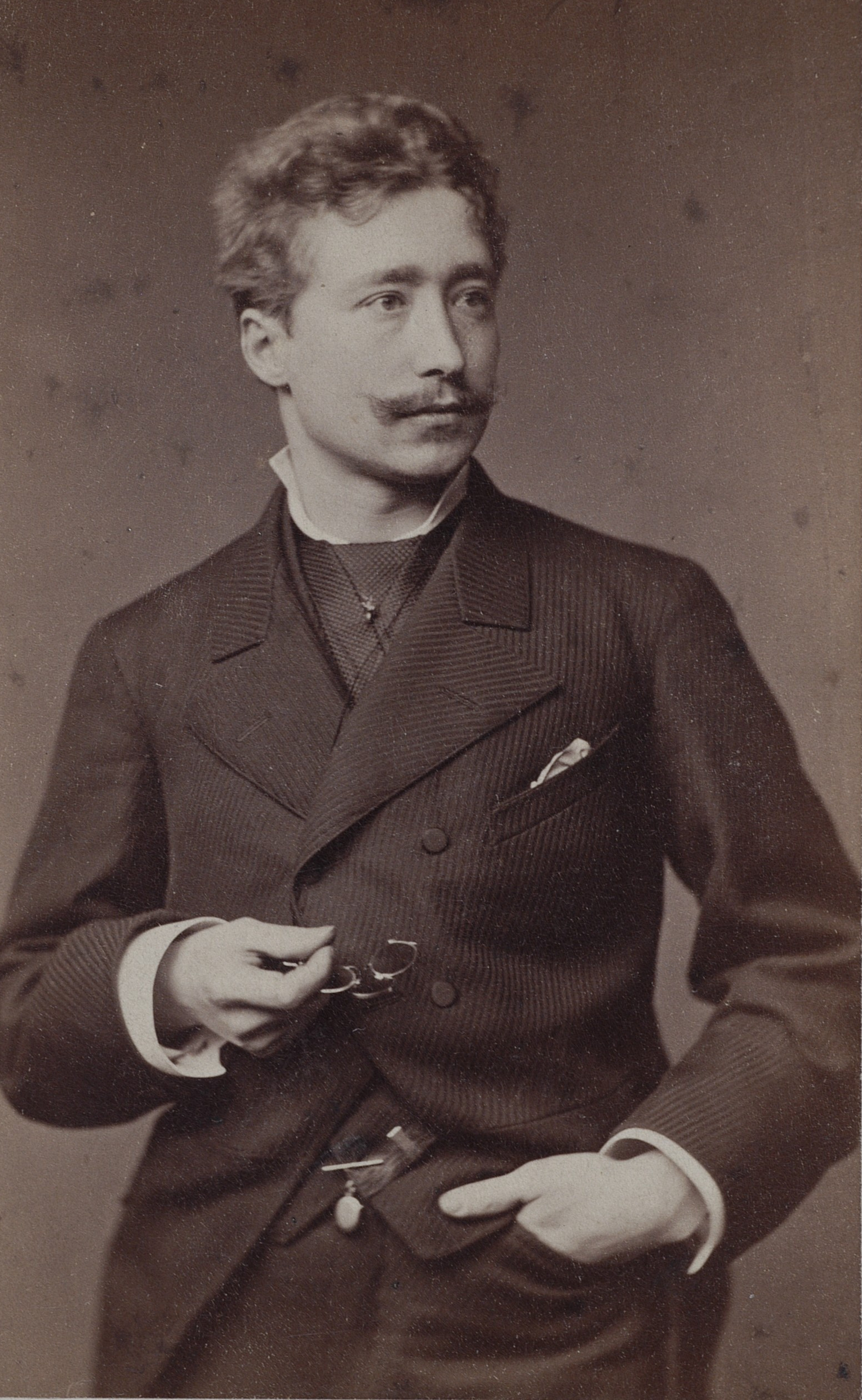
- Alfred Kowalski (1875)
- Born: Alfred Jan Maksymilian Kowalski; 11 October 1849; Suwałki, Augustów Governorate, Kingdom of Poland
- Died: 16 February 1915 (aged 65); Munich, German Empire
- Resting place: Powązki Cemetery
- Known for: Painting

Alfred Jan Maksymilian Kowalski (Alfred Wierusz-Kowalski; 11 October 1849 – 16 February 1915) was a Polish painter and representative of the Munich School.

== Life ==
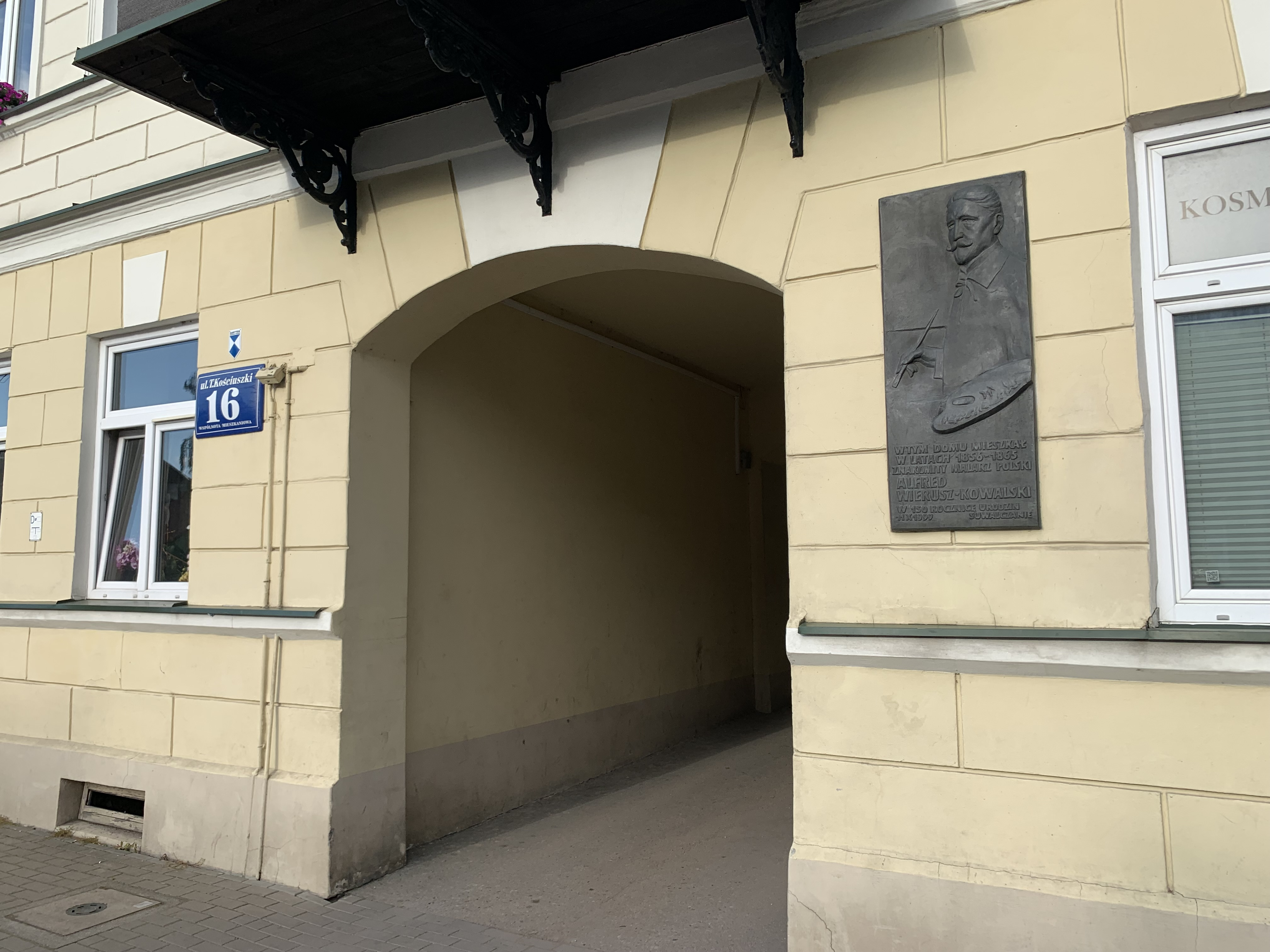
Kowalski's home from 1856-1865 in Suwałki with a plaque on the right side of the entrance.

He was born on 11 October 1849 in Suwałki to father Teofil Kowalski of the Wieruszowa coat of arms and mother Teofilia (née Siewierska).

Wierusz-Kowalski settled in Munich in 1876 after studies in Warsaw, Prague, and Dresden. He studied for a year at the Munich Academy of Fine Arts, and worked under Józef Brandt and Alexander von Wagner. In 1890 he was nominated as an honorary professor of the Munich Academy.

He was the most popular Polish painter in Munich, alongside Józef Brandt. His paintings received medals at numerous art exhibitions and were sought after by collectors and German art dealers.

He painted landscapes, generic and historical scenes. After his journey to Africa in 1903 he also undertook oriental themes. His works were sold mostly on the German market and many of them ended in private collections in Germany and the United States. Some of his paintings can be seen in collections of Polish museums. Kowalski's Lone Wolf was the most famous and one of his most reproduced paintings, which gained great popularity especially in the United States.

He died on 16 February 1915 and was initially buried at the Munich Waldfriedhof Cemetery. His remains were later transferred to the Powązki Cemetery in Warsaw.

In 1972, a permanent exhibition of his works was opened in the District Museum in Suwałki.

== Selected paintings ==
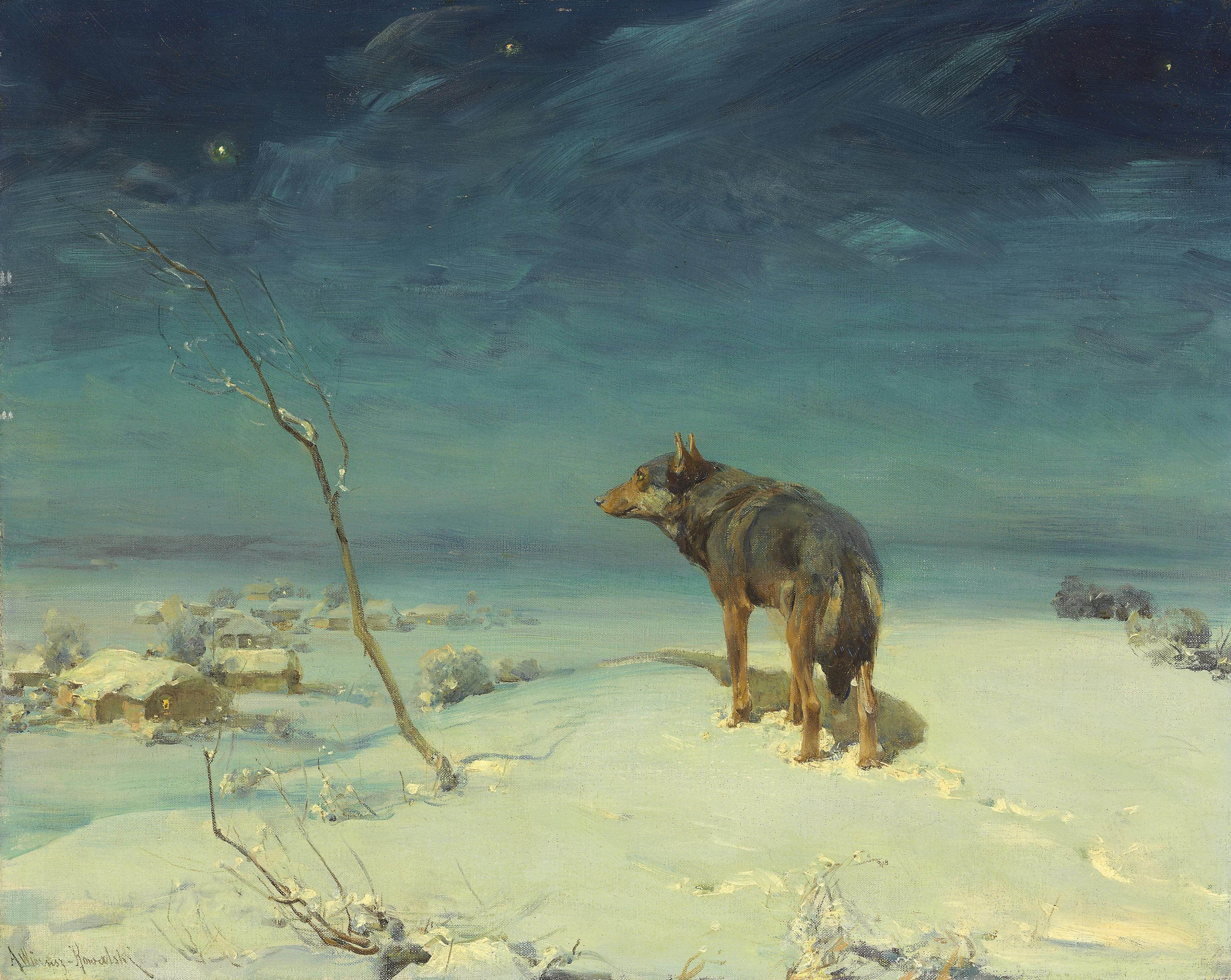
Lone Wolf

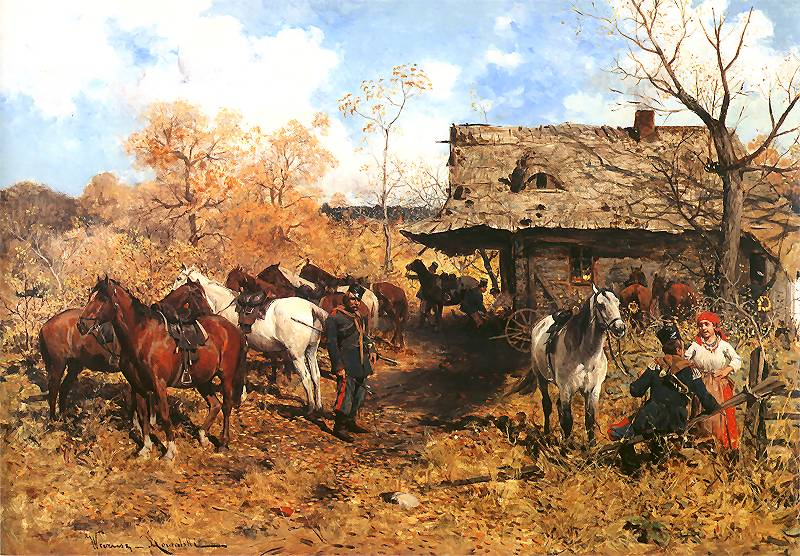
Ulans Stop, 1877

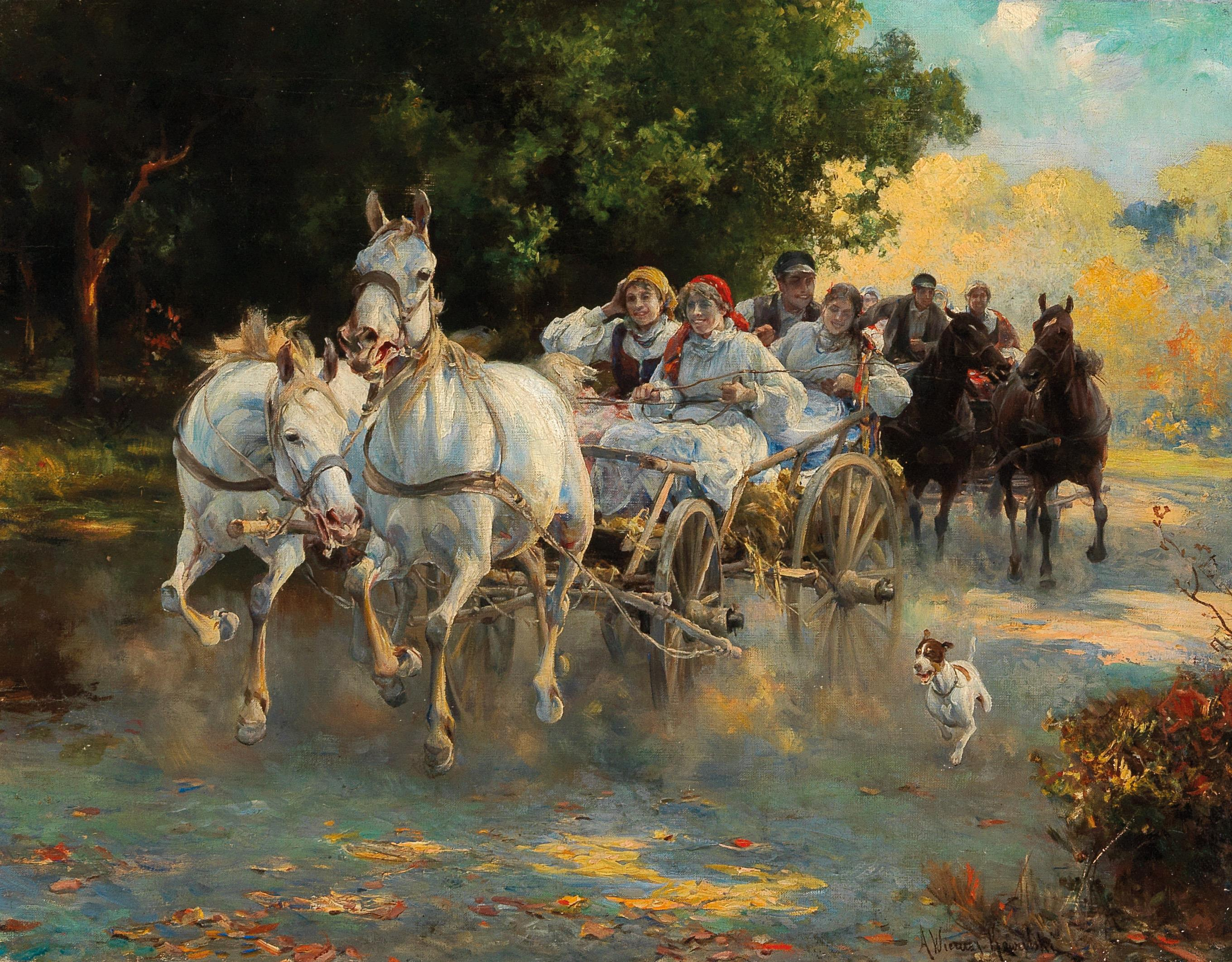
The Peasant Wedding, 1915, Private collection

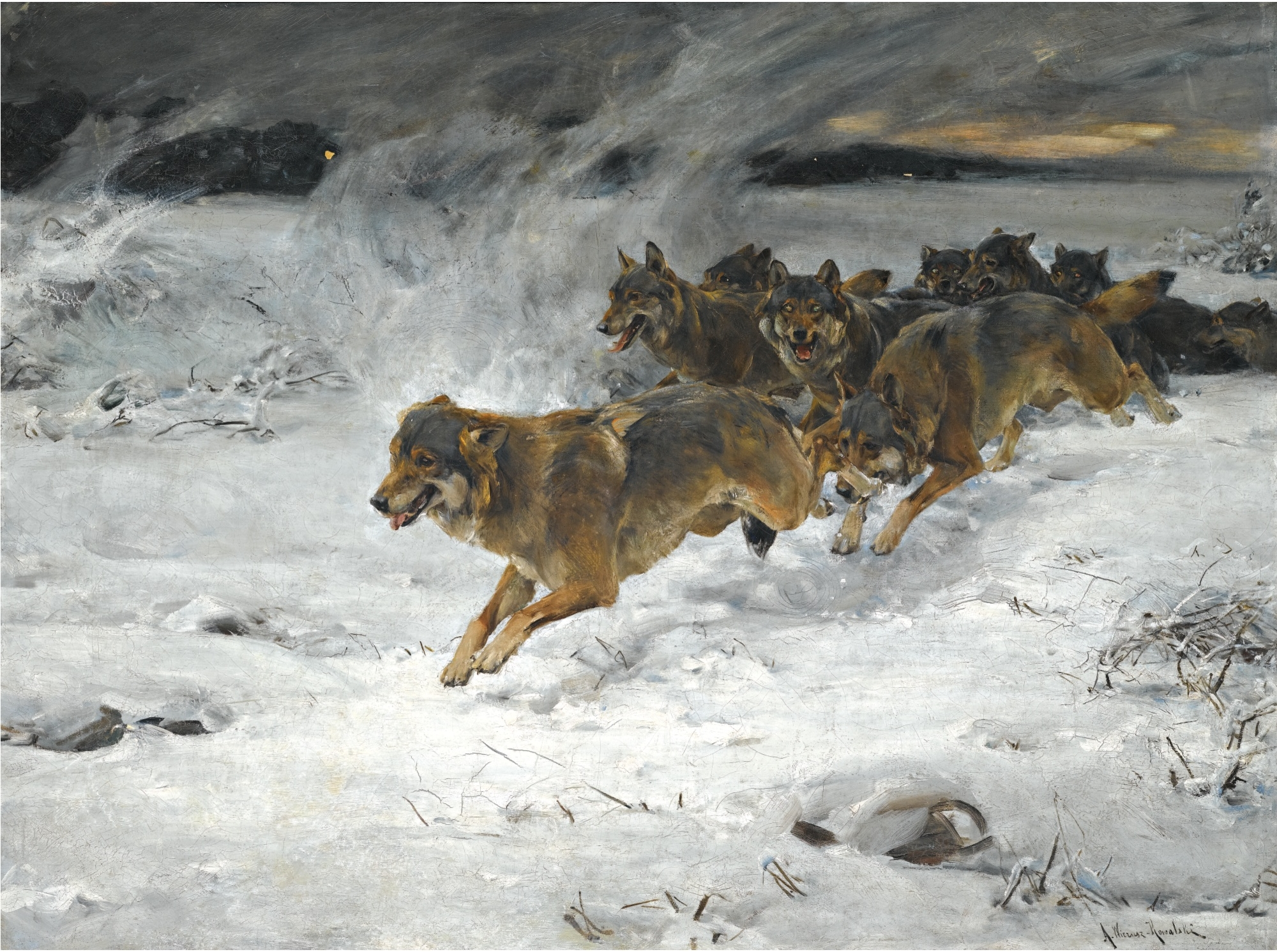
A Pack of Wolves, Private collection

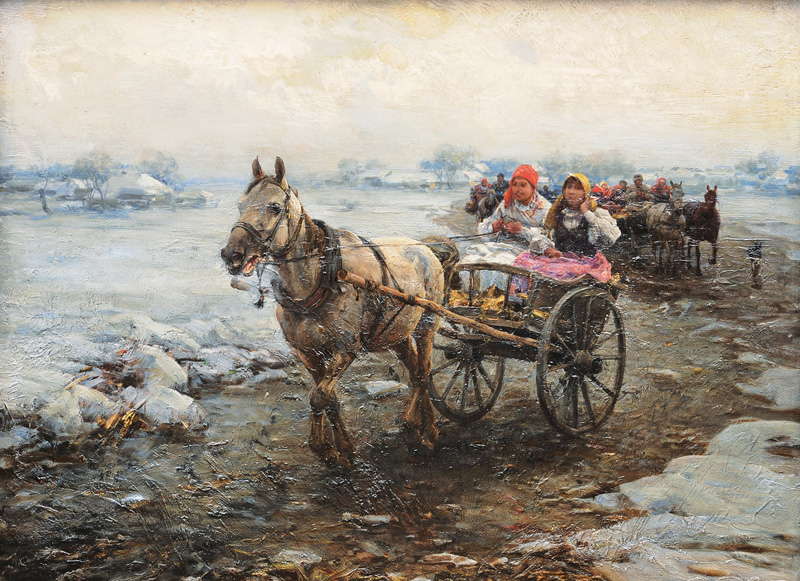
Evening Carriage Ride

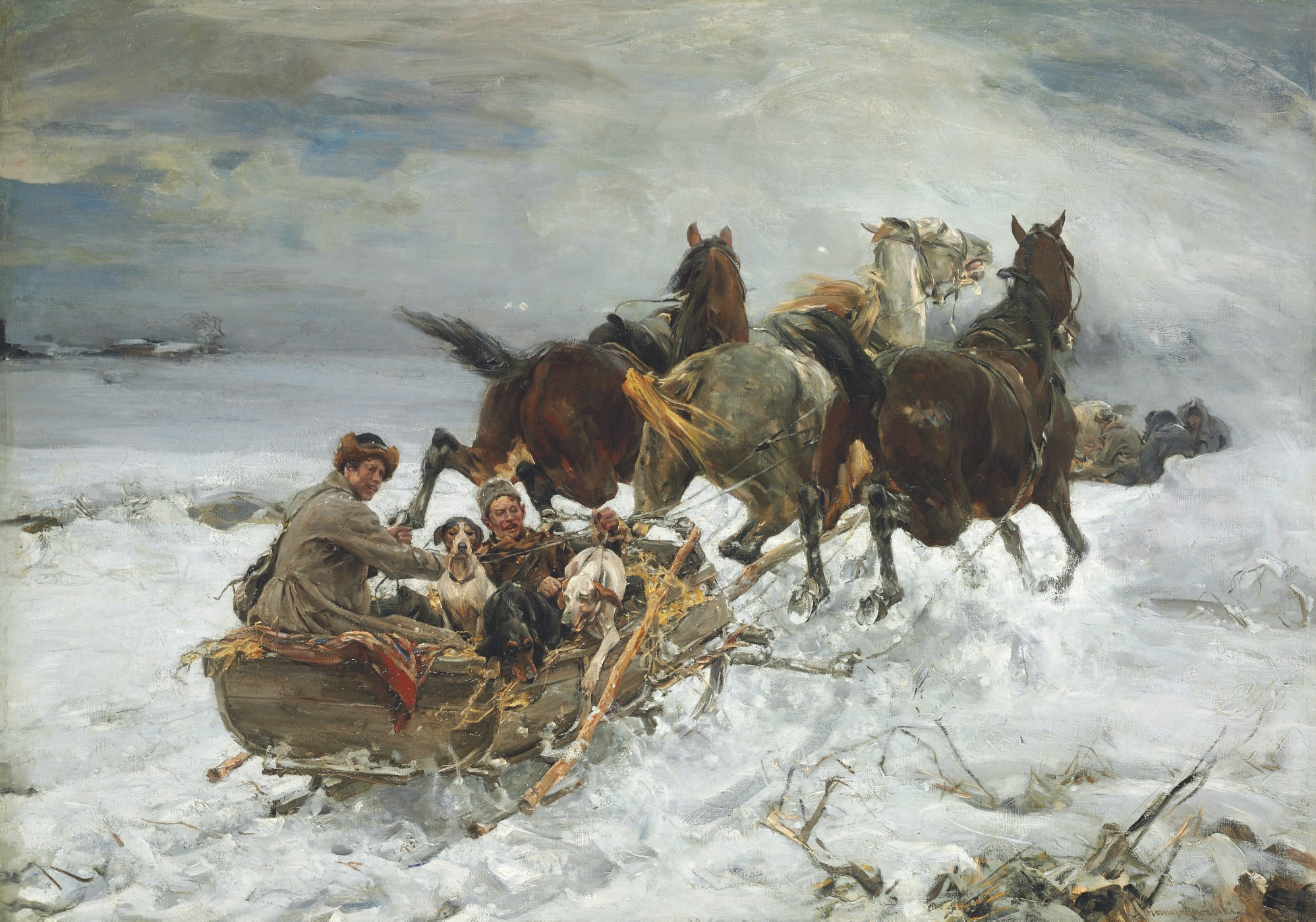
Horse-drawn Sleigh, Private collection

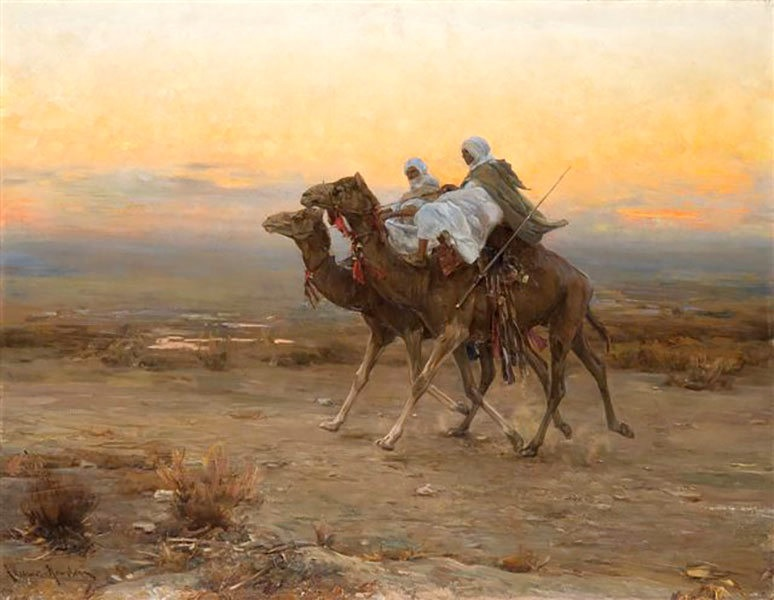
Scene in Morocco, National Museum in Wrocław

== See also ==
- List of Polish painters
