= Hermann Kaulbach =

German painter

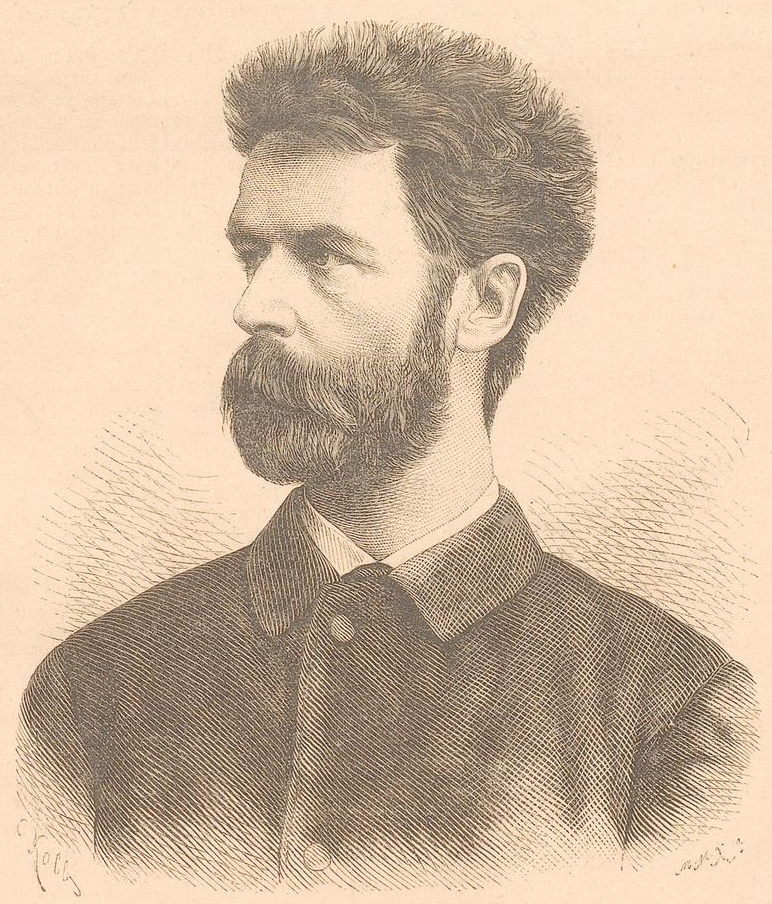
Hermann Kaulbach, from a supplement to the Darmstädter Tageblatt, Nr. 11/1889

Hermann Kaulbach (26 July 1846 – 9 December 1909) was a German painter of the Munich School.

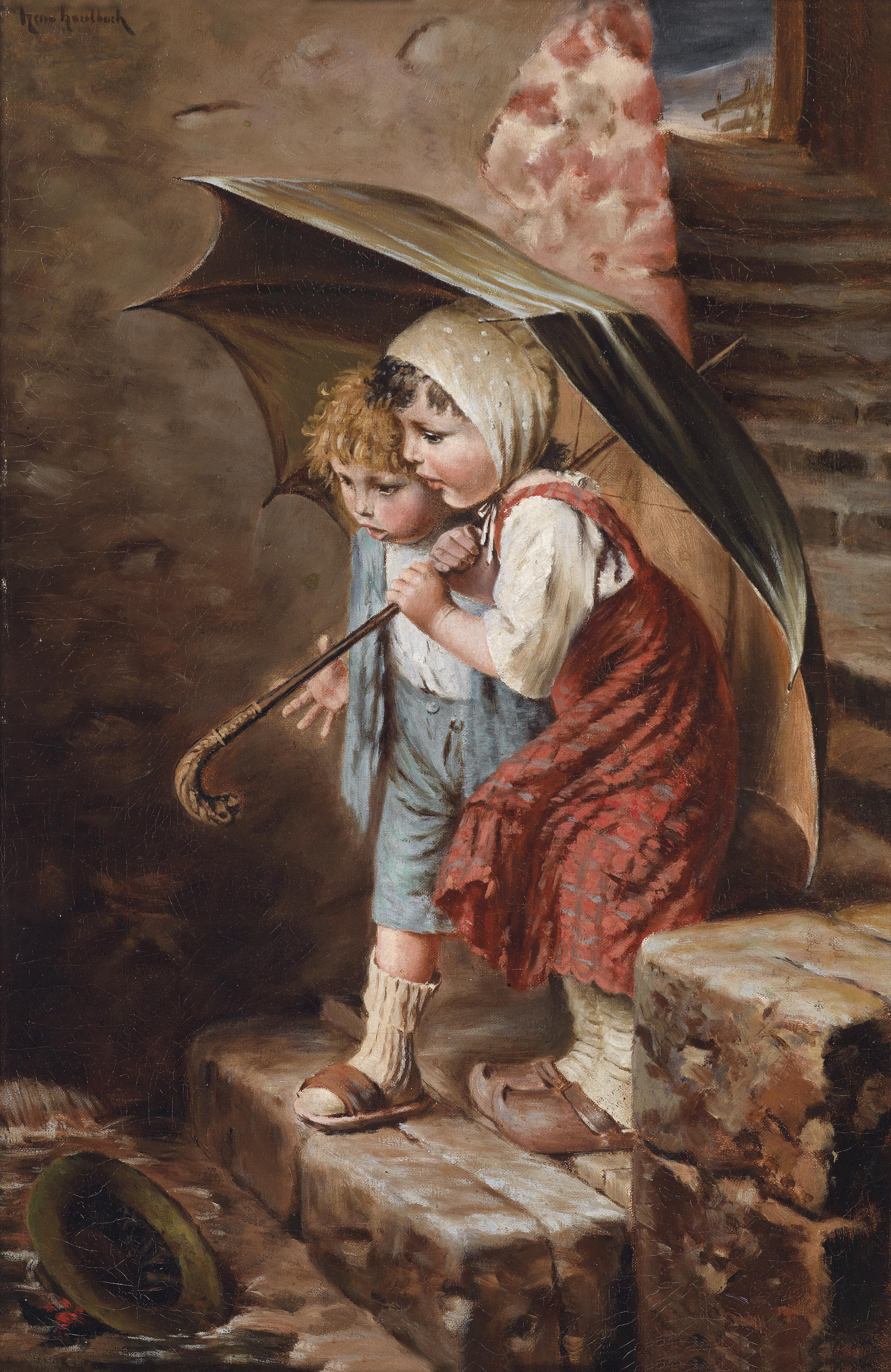
Die Überraschung (The Surprise, 1906?)

== Life ==
Kaulbach was born in Munich as the son of painter Wilhelm von Kaulbach. He was originally a medical student at the Ludwig-Maximilians-Universität München but, perhaps inspired by his father, quit school to study painting instead. In 1867, he became a student of Karl von Piloty. Under his influence, Kaulbach devoted himself almost entirely to historical themes. Ultimately though, he became best known for his portraits of children. He made two study trips to Rome, in 1880 and 1891. In 1886, he was appointed a Professor of History Painting at the Academy of Fine Arts Munich. In 1906 he published a picture book, with children as the motif, that sold 135,000 copies.

He was married to Sophie Schroll, the daughter of an engraver, and they had three children. Many of his works are on display at the Museum in Bad Arolsen (his father's birthplace). His letters and other papers are in the collection of the German Literature Archive (part of the Museum of Modern Literature) in Marbach am Neckar. He is buried in the Alter Südfriedhof in Munich.

== Criticism ==
Although his work was generally well received, he was occasionally criticized for giving too much attention to detail, while missing the significance of the painting's main subject. His portrait of Lucrezia Borgia created a controversy because it was considered "too lewd", and his version of the Coronation of St.Elizabeth by Emperor Frederick II was dismissed by some critics as "costume painting".

== Major works ==
- "Hansel und Gretel bei der Hexe" (Hansel and Gretel with the Witch; 1872, in the Municipal Gallery, Riga)
- "Mozarts Letzte Tage" (Mozart's Last Days; 1878, in the Municipal Gallery, Vienna)
- Portrait of Anton Bruckner, (1885, in the Oberösterreichischen Landesmuseum – Schlossmuseum, Linz)
- "Krönung der heiligen Elisabeth durch Kaiser Friedrich II" (Coronation of St.Elisabeth by Emperor Frederick II; 1886, in the Museum at Wiesbaden)
- "An der Grabstätte des Freundes" (At the Tomb of a Friend; 1888, in the Neue Pinakothek, Munich)

== Publications ==
- Hermann Kaulbach: Bilderbuch. Mit 45 Bildern von Professor Hermann Kaulbach in München und einem Porträt des Künstlers (Text by Adelheid Stier), Union Deutsche Verlagsgesellschaft, First Edition, 1906
