= Georgios Jakobides =

Greek painter (1853–1932)

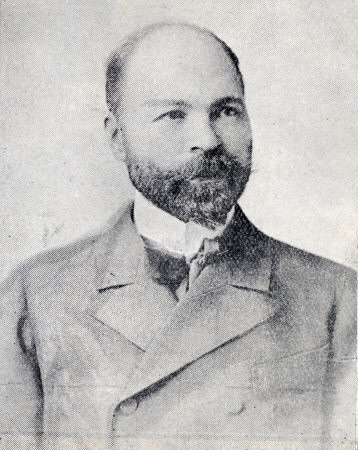
- Georgios Jakobides
- Born: 11 January 1853; Chidira, Lesbos, Ottoman Empire
- Died: 13 December 1932 (aged 79); Athens, Greece
- Known for: Painting and sculpture
- Notable work: The Children's Recital (Παιδική Συναυλία) (1894); Spring (Η Άνοιξις) (1927); The First Steps (Τα Πρώτα Βήματα); The Wife and Son of the Artist (Η Σύζυγος και ο γιος του ζωγράφου) (1898)
- Movement: Naturalism

Georgios Jakobides (Greek: Γεώργιος Ιακωβίδης; 11 January 1853 – 13 December 1932) was a Greek painter and medallist, one of the main representatives of the Greek artistic movement of the Munich School. He founded and was the first curator of the National Gallery of Greece in Athens.

== Life ==
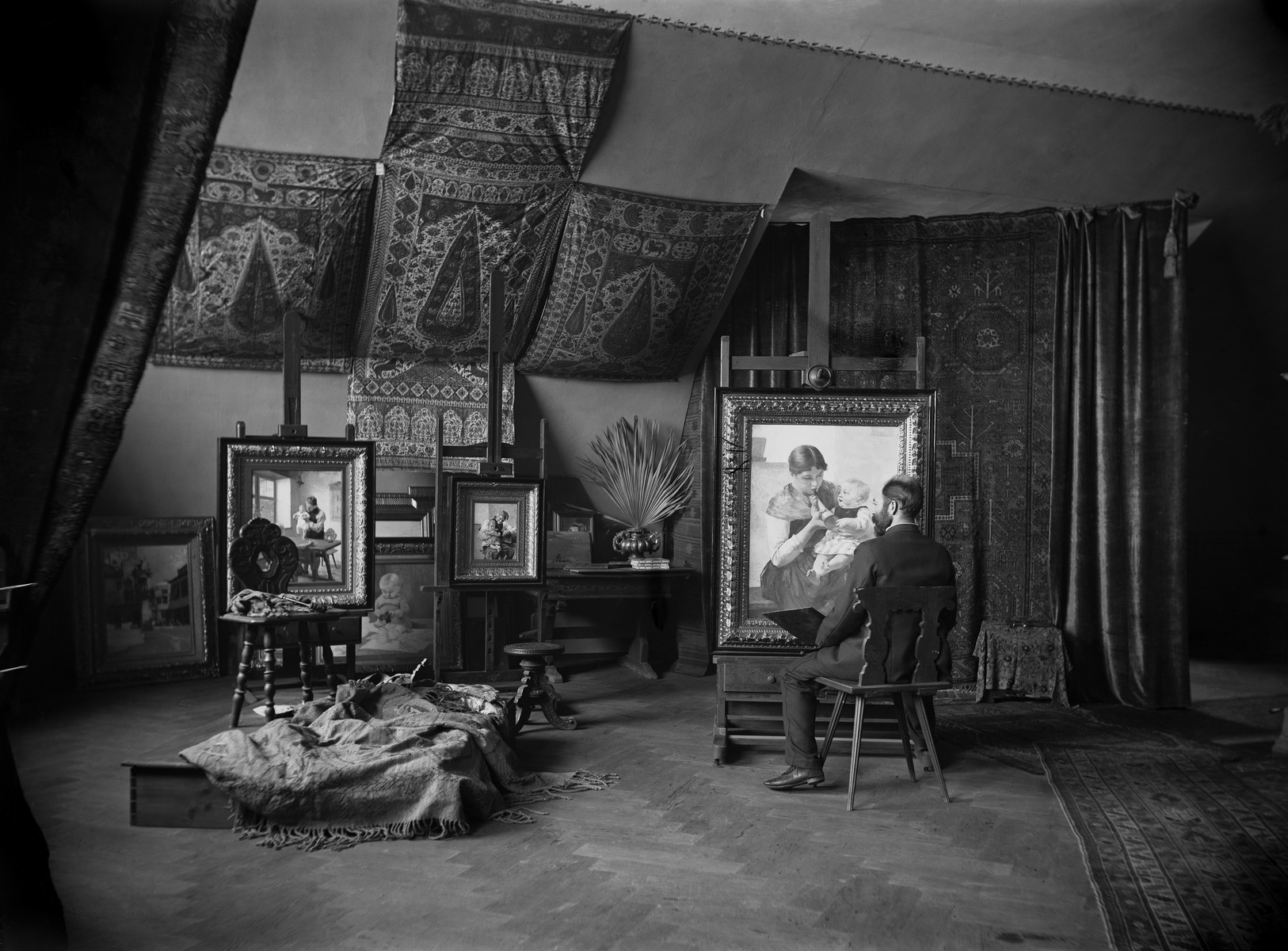
Jakobides in his studio, photographed by Carl Teufel, 1883

He was born in Chidira, Lesbos. At the age of 13, he traveled to Smyrna to live with his uncle and study at the Evangelical School. From 1870 to 1876, Jakobides studied sculpture and painting at the Athens School of Fine Arts under Nikiphoros Lytras, and in 1877 he went to the Academy of Fine Arts in Munich on a scholarship to continue his painting studies under Ludwig von Lofftz, Wilhelm Lindenschmidt and Gabriel von Max.

In Munich, he lived for 17 years where he worked in his studio, painting mythological scenes, genre pictures, and portraits. His work is influenced by German academic Realism. His most famous paintings were depictions of children, but he was also o notable portrait painter. In the capital of Bavaria, he was regarded as a successful German artist selling many of his works at high prices. The Greek government invited him in 1900 to return to Athens in order to organize the National Gallery of Athens, and in 1904 he was appointed Director of the Athens School of Fine Arts, where he taught for 25 years. At this time, additional to his themes he produced official portraits of eminent Greeks (e.g., Queen Sophia). He opposed all new artistic tendencies, including Impressionism and Expressionism, but supported younger artists to follow their own individual artistic tendencies.He was awarded at five international exhibits: among those in Berlin 1891 and in Paris 1900.

His works are found in the National Gallery of Athens, private collections and in museums and art galleries around the world including art galleries in Germany and the Art Institute of Chicago.

Jakobides' opus consists of some two hundred oil paintings, several of which are on display in Europe and overseas. His son, the actor Michalis Iakovides, donated his personal journal – which includes a list of his paintings between 1878 and 1919 – to the National Gallery of Greece in 1951.

He died in Athens in 1932.

== Legacy ==
In addition to his work as a painter, Jakobides was commissioned to create designs for a number of modern Greek coins including the 1 and 2 drachma coins from 1910 and 1911, the 50 lepta of 1921, and the 10 lepta of 1922.

== Gallery ==
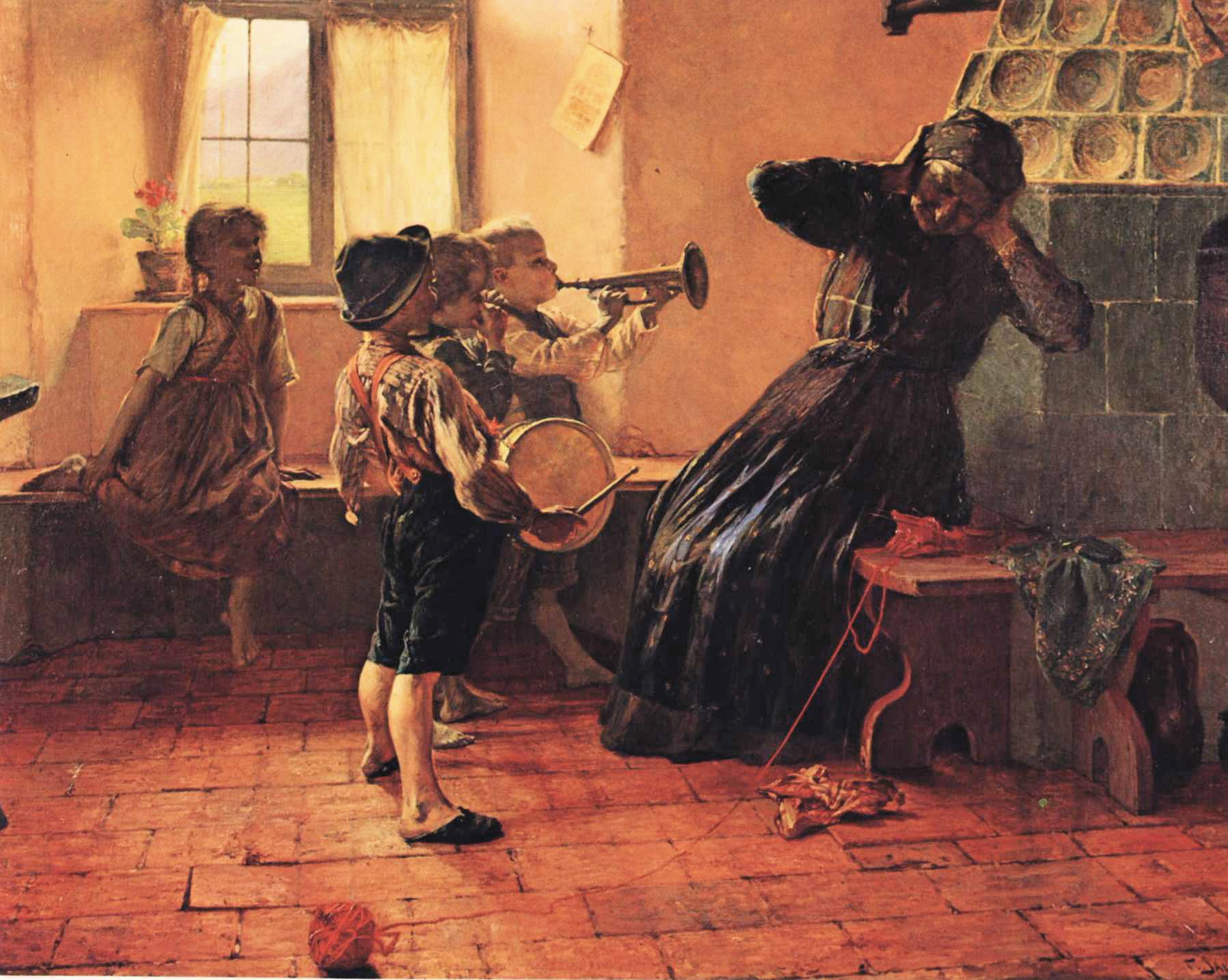
Children's Concert

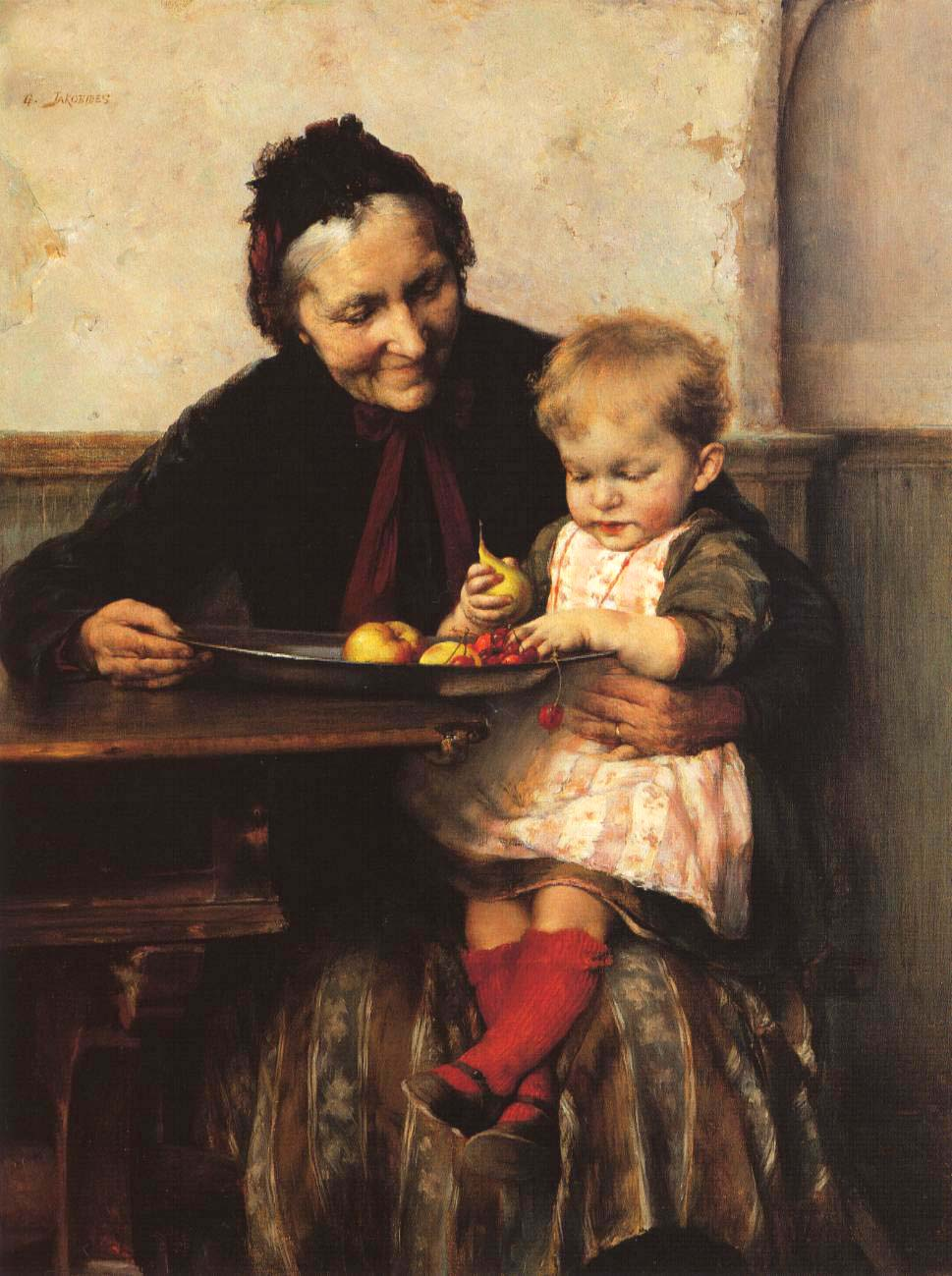
Grandma's Favorite

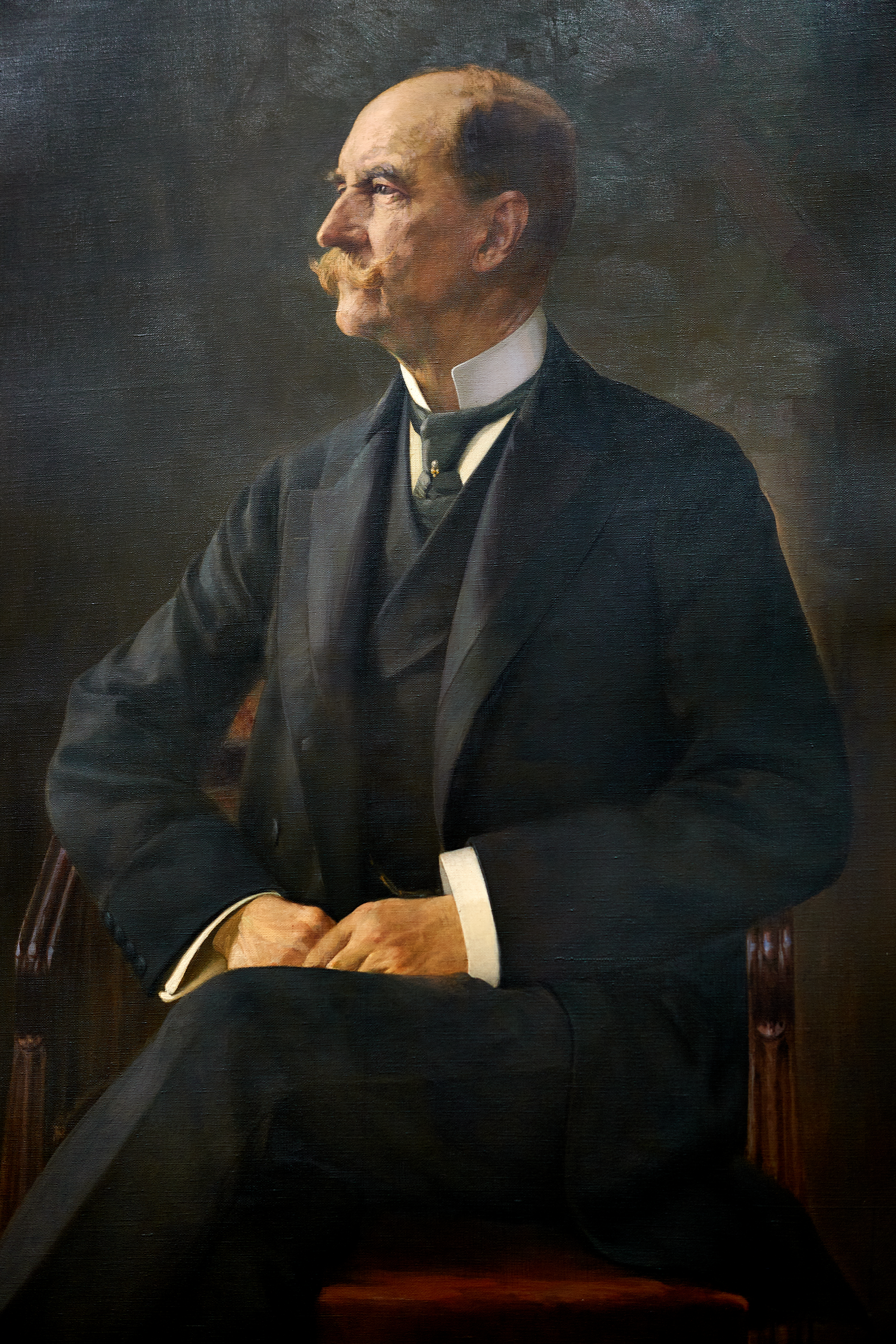
Portrait of King George I

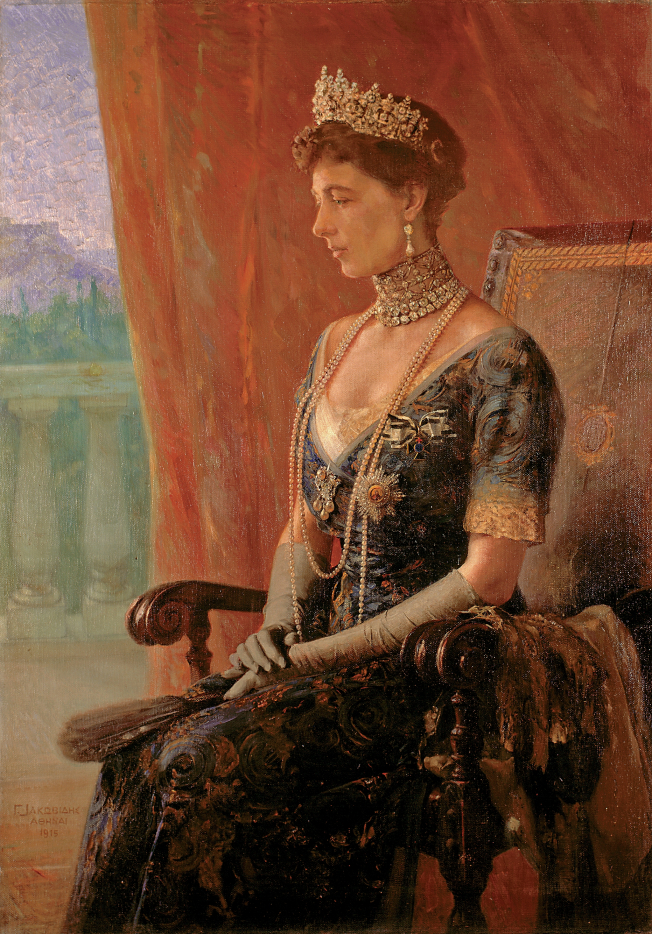
Portrait of Queen Sofia of Greece

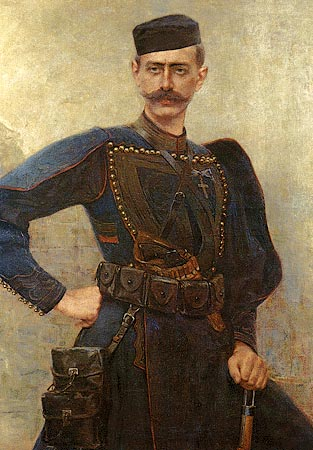
Pavlos Melas

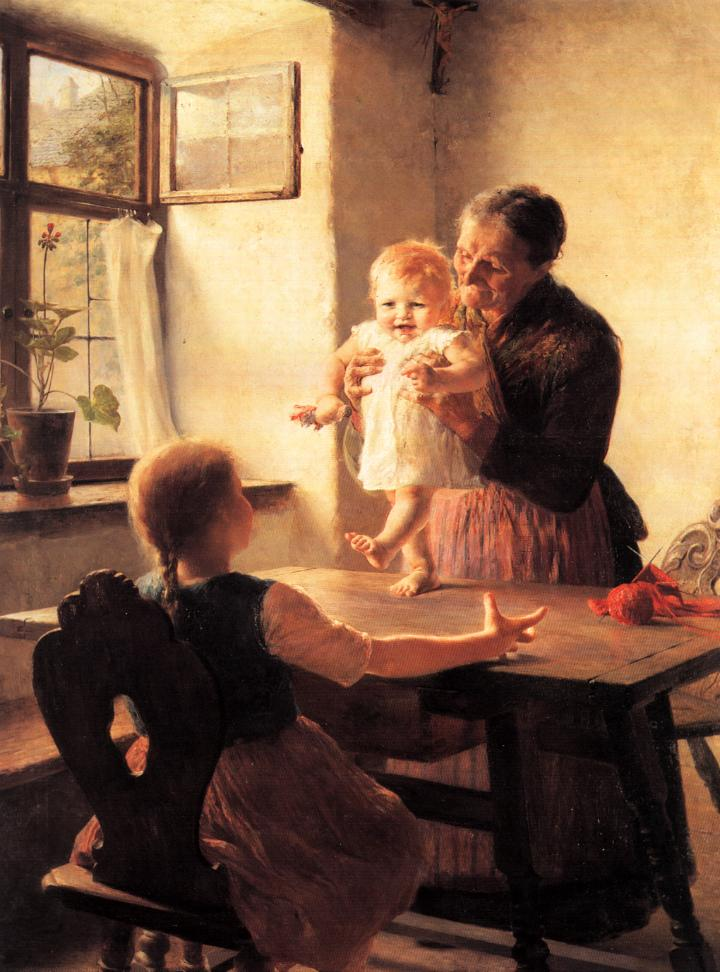
The First Steps (1893)

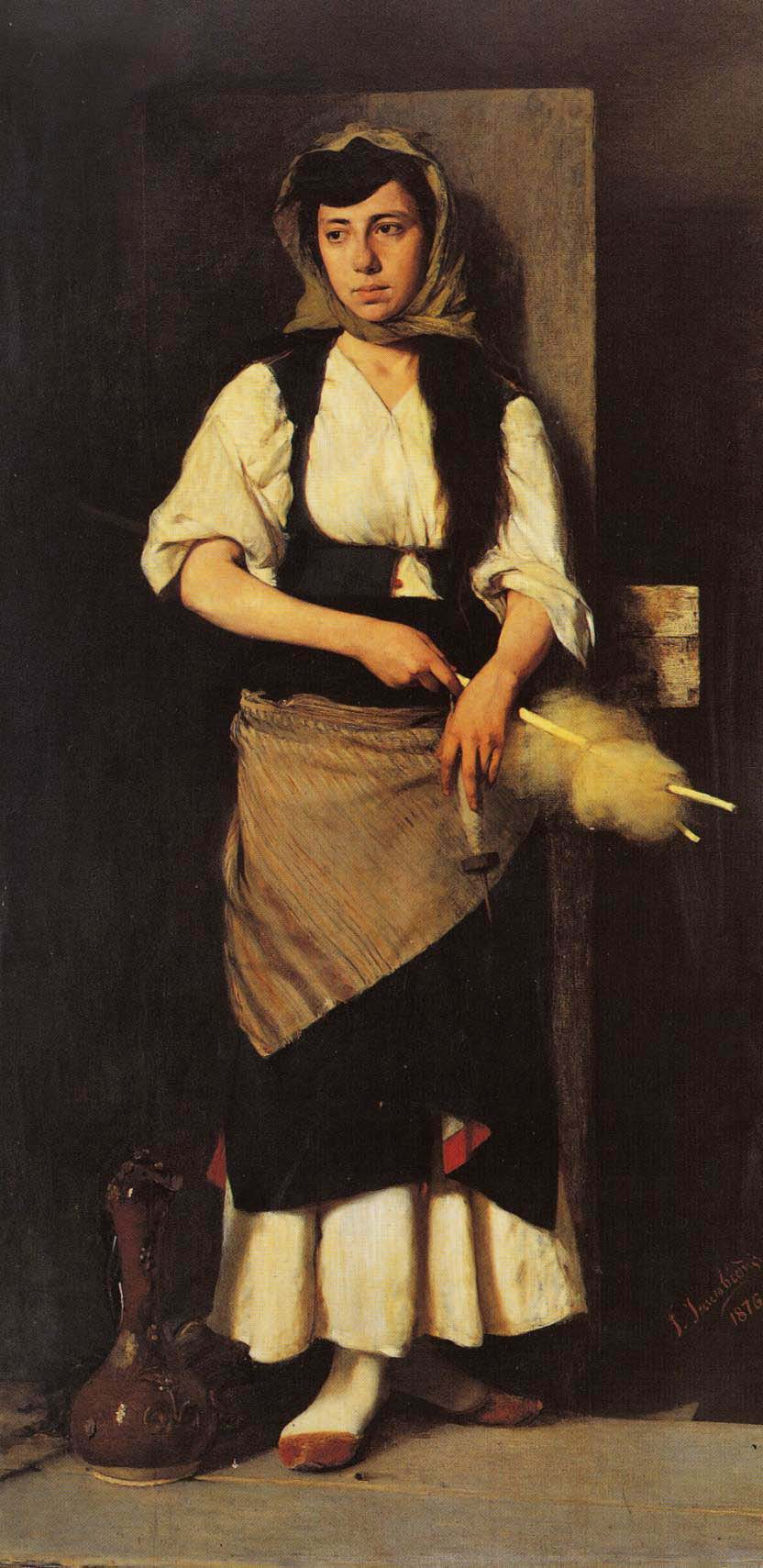
The Girl

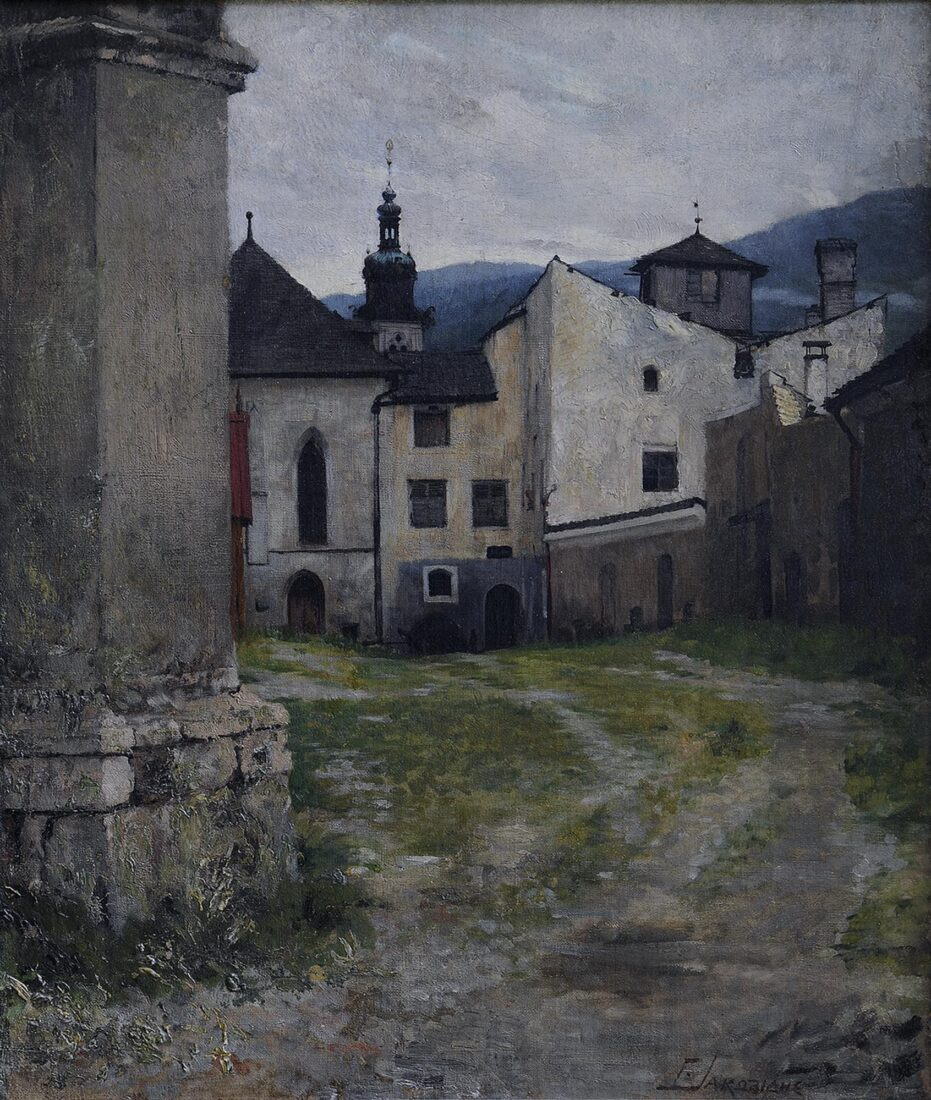
Bavarian village

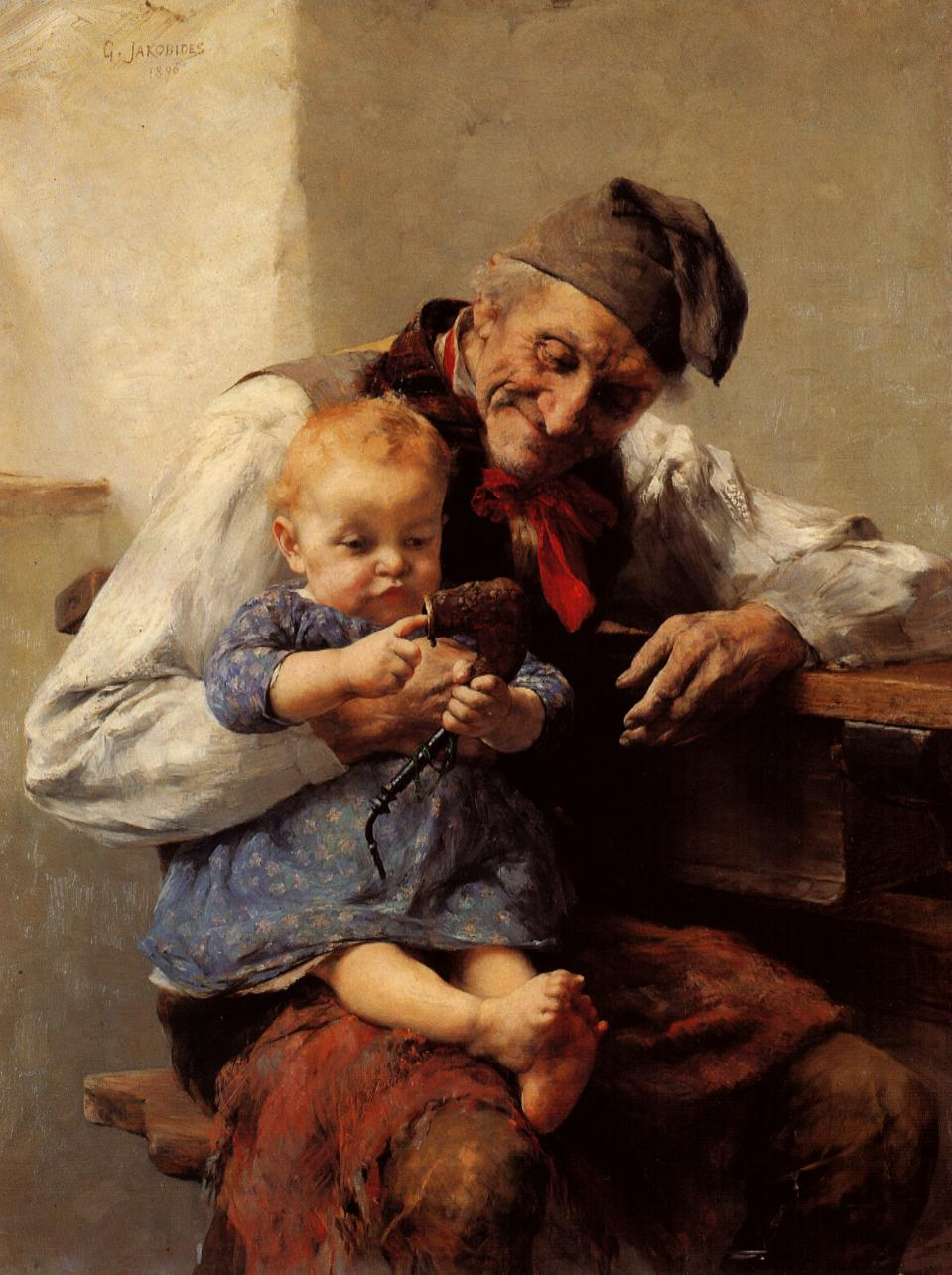
The Favorite

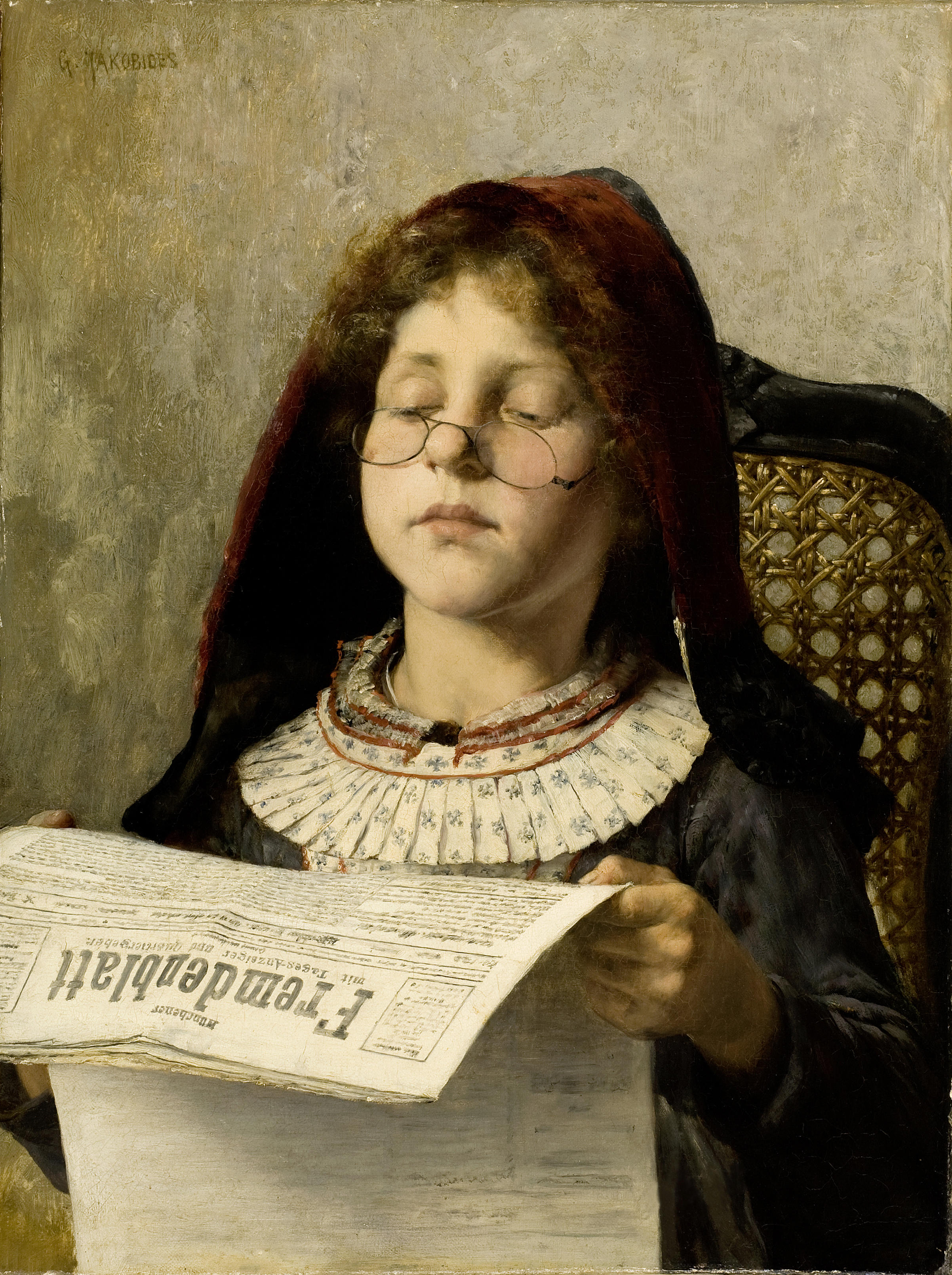
Girl Reading

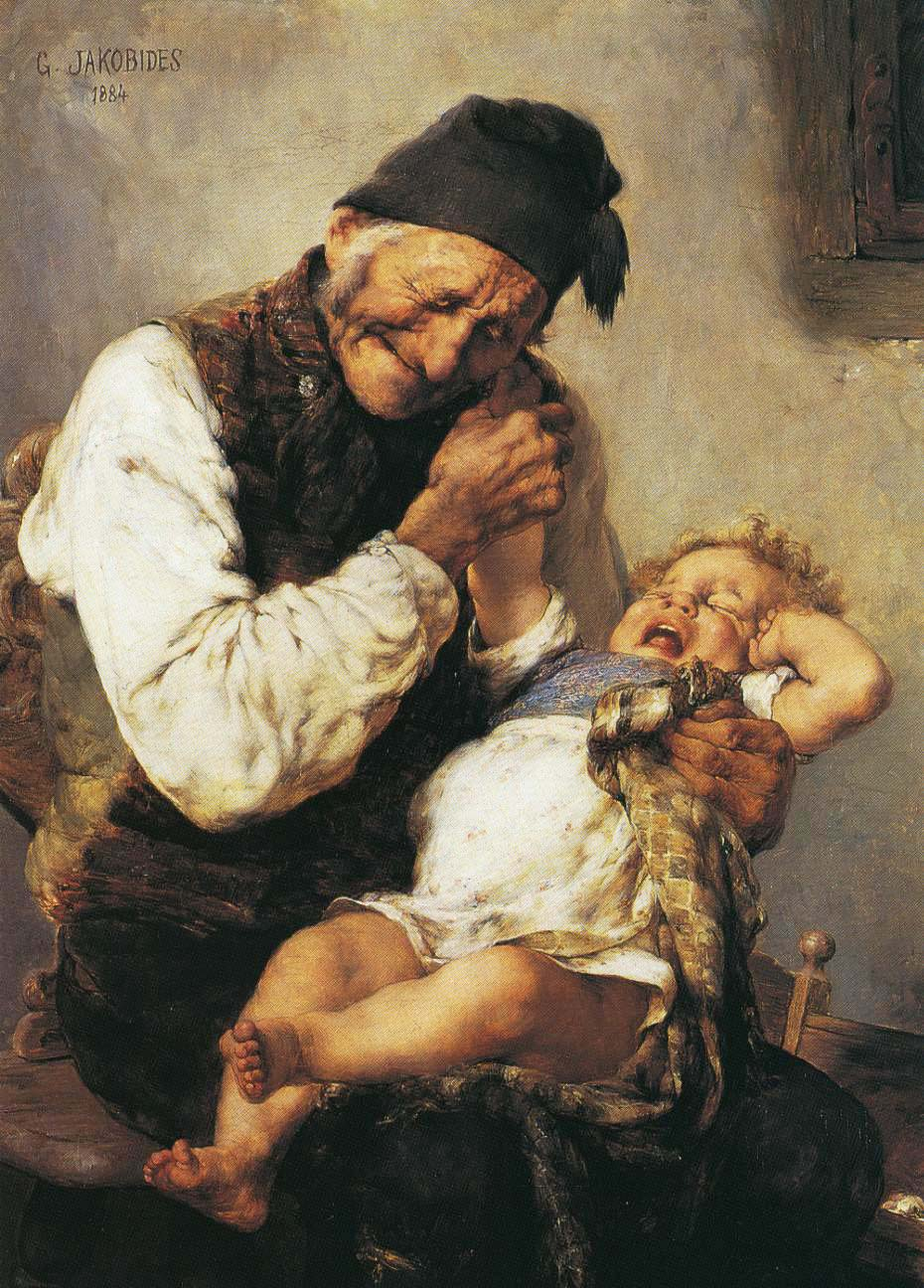
The Naughty Grandson

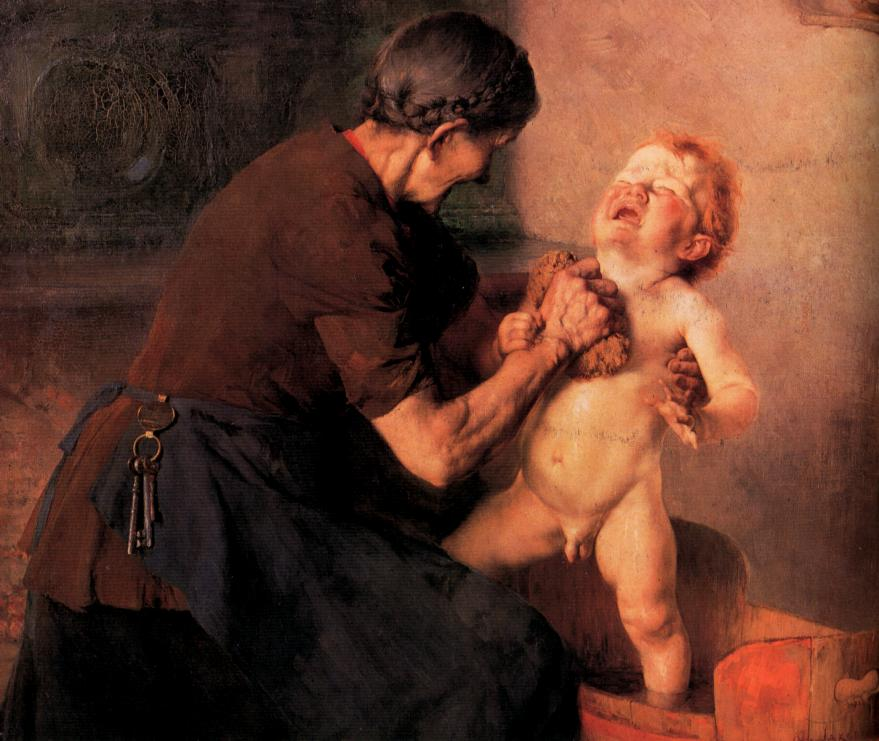
Cold Shower

== See also ==
- Munich School
- Art in modern Greece
