= Wilhelm von Kaulbach =

German painter (1805–1874)

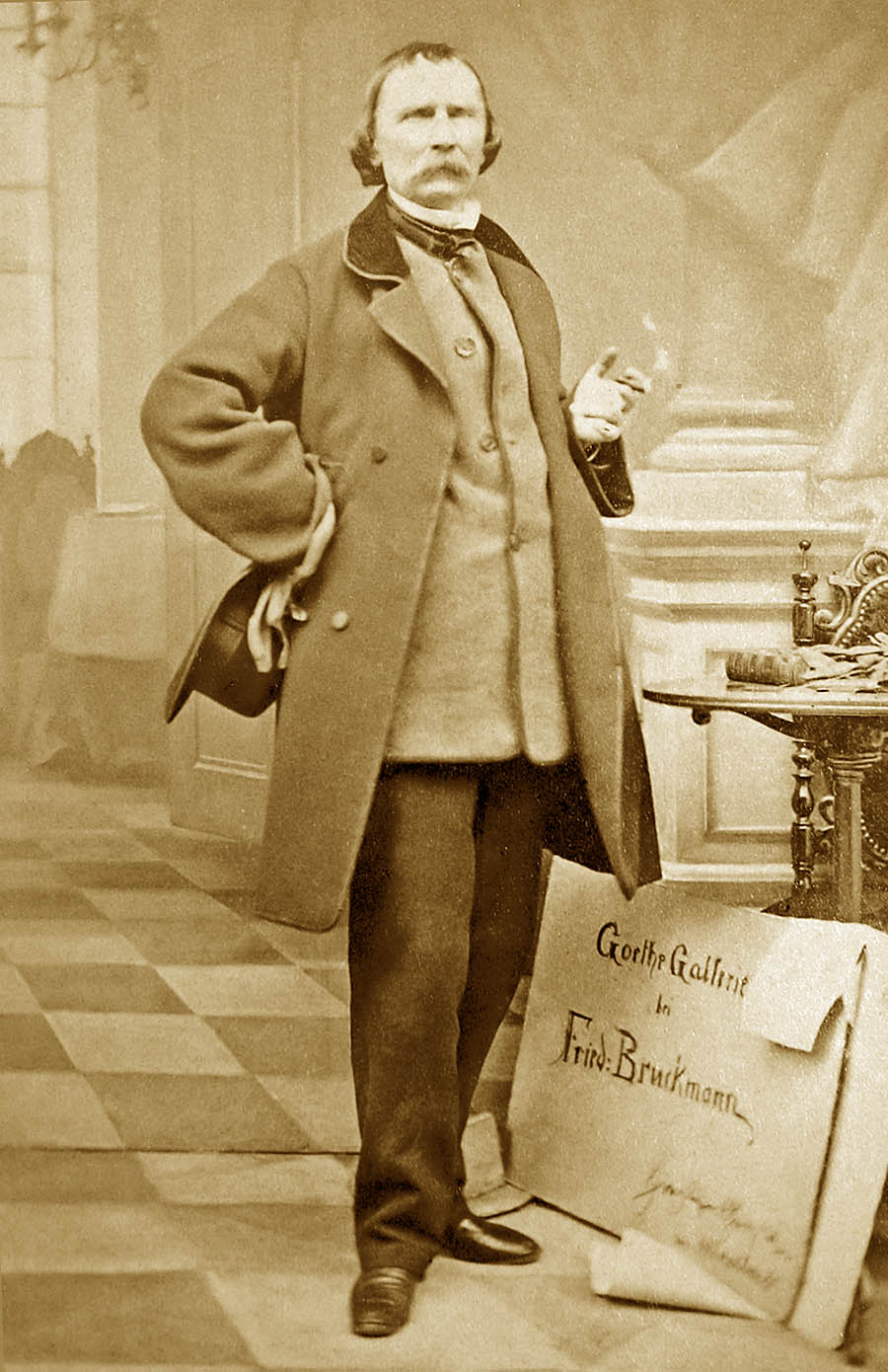
Photograph of Wilhelm von Kaulbach in 1864

Wilhelm von Kaulbach (15 October 1805 – 7 April 1874) was a German painter, muralist, and book illustrator. His murals decorate buildings in Munich. He is associated with the Düsseldorf school of painting.

== Biography ==
=== Education ===
Wilhelm von Kaulbach was born in Bad Arolsen, Waldeck. His father combined painting and engraving with the goldsmith's trade. The family was so poor that he and his sister were glad to accept even stale bread from the peasantry in exchange for the father's engravings. This is said to have suggested to him his earliest work, The Fall of Manna in the Wilderness. At seventeen, Wilhelm was granted admission to the Düsseldorf Academy of Fine Arts by the sculptor Rauch. The academy was then becoming renowned under the directorship of Peter von Cornelius, of whom he became a distinguished pupil.

=== Munich murals ===
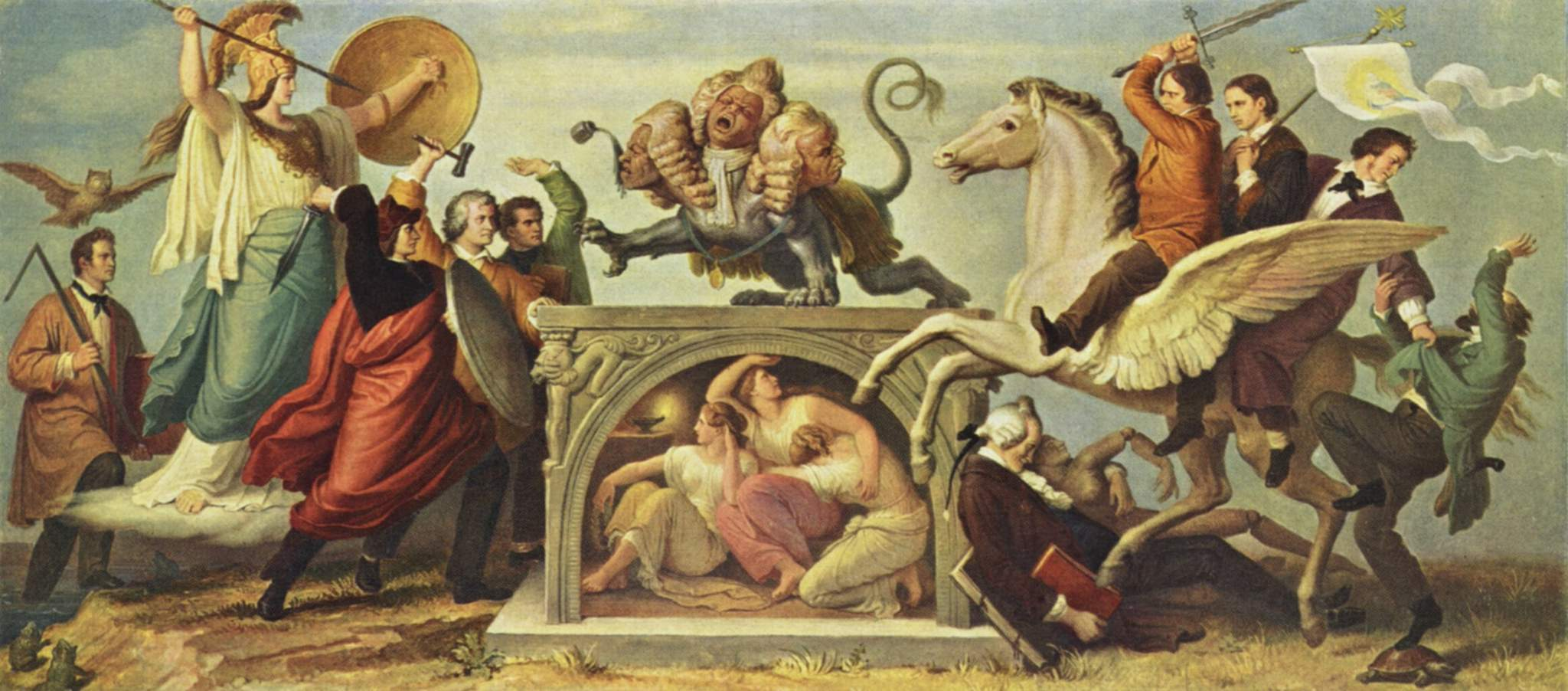
Sketches for frescos in the New Pinakothek, 1850

The ambitious work by which Ludwig I of Bavaria sought to transform Munich into a German Athens afforded the young painter an appropriate sphere. Cornelius had been commissioned to execute the enormous frescoes in the Glyptothek, and his custom was in the winters, with the aid of Kaulbach and others, to complete the cartoons at Düsseldorf, and in the summers, accompanied by his best pupils, to carry out the designs in colour on the museum walls in Munich. In 1824 Cornelius became director of the Munich Academy of Fine Arts. Kaulbach, not yet twenty, followed, took up his permanent residence in Munich, worked hard on the public works, executed independent commissions, and in 1849, when Cornelius left for Berlin, succeeded to the directorship of the academy, an office which he held until his death.

Kaulbach matured, after the example of the masters of the Middle Ages, the practice of mural or monumental decoration; he once more conjoined painting with architecture, and displayed a creative fertility and readiness of resource scarcely found since the era of Raphael and Michelangelo. Under the direction of Cornelius, he designed (1825–1828) many frescoes for the new buildings at Munich, including "Apollo and the Muses", for the ceiling of the Odeon; designs from Klopstock's Battle of Hermann", and from Goethe's and Wieland's poems, for the royal palace; purely classical illustrations of the story of Amor and Psyche, for the palace of Duke Max; and many allegorical figures for the arcades of the palace garden.

Early in the series of his multitudinous works came the famous Narrenhaus, the appalling memories of a certain madhouse near Düsseldorf; the composition all the more deserves mention for points of contact with Hogarth. Somewhat to the same category belong the illustrations to Reineke Fuchs. After Narrenhaus, his next great work, the Battle of the Huns, or Spectre Battle, representing the legend of the continued combat in mid-air between the spirits of the Huns and of Romans who had fallen before the walls of Rome, exhibited on the largest scale his talent for the symbolical and allegorical. Count Raczynski commissioned him to paint the work in sepia, and he finished it in 1837. The king of Saxony now offered him the direction of the academy of Dresden, with a salary of 2,000 thalers; but Kaulbach preferred to remain in Munich, although he received only 800 florins from the king of Bavaria.

These works, together with occasional figures or passages in complex pictorial dramas, show how dominant and irrepressible were the artist's sense of satire and enjoyment of fun; character in its breadth and sharpness is depicted with keenest relish, and at times the sardonic smile bursts into the loudest laugh. Thus occasionally the grotesque degenerates into the vulgar, the grand into the ridiculous, as in the satire on "The Pigtail Age", a fresco outside the New Pinakothek. Yet these exceptional extravagances came not of weakness but from excess of power. Kaulbach tried hard to become Grecian and Italian; but he never reached Phidias or Raphael; in short, the blood of Dürer, Holbein and Martin Schöngauer ran strong in his veins. The art products in Munich during the middle of the 19th century were of a quantity to preclude first-rate quality, and Kaulbach contracted a fatal facility in covering wall and canvas by the acre.

=== History of Mankind ===
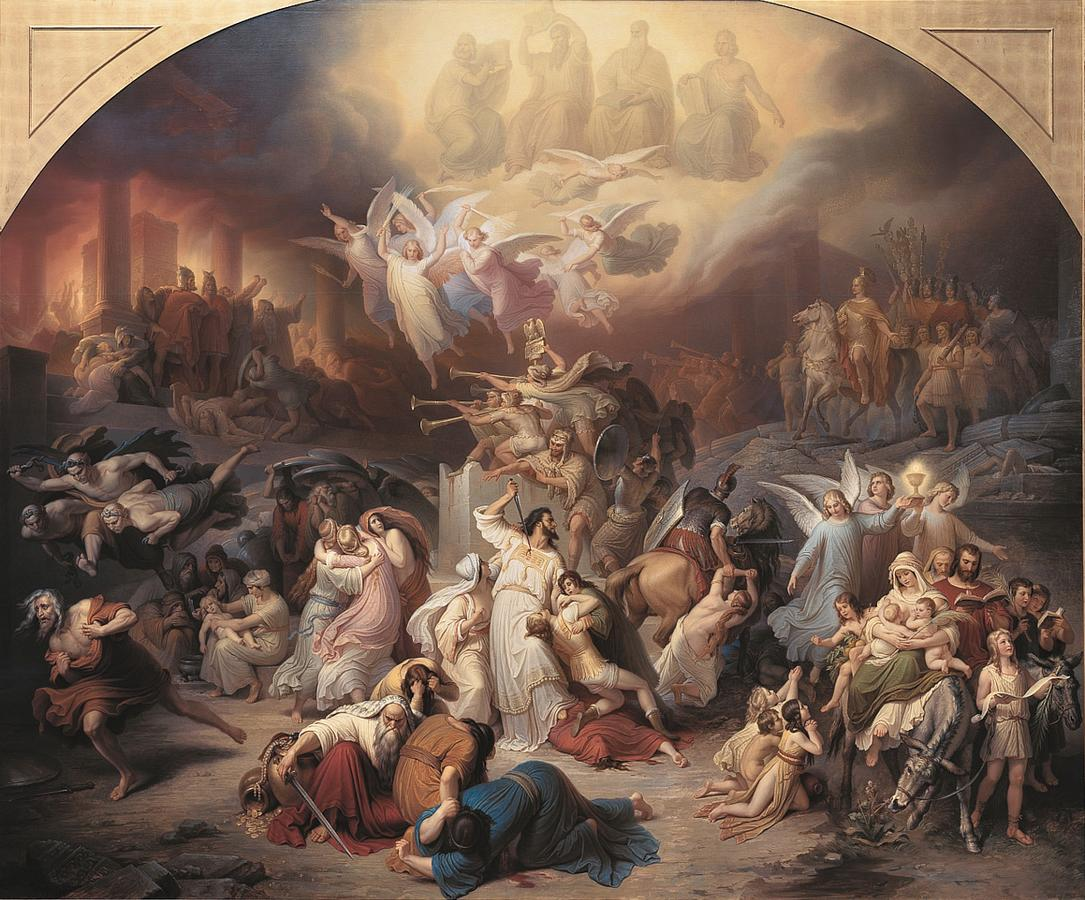
Destruction of Jerusalem

Having hitherto worked almost exclusively in fresco, he spent some time in Venice and a year in Rome to prepare himself for painting the cartoon in oil for the new Pinakothek, completing it in 1846. About the same time he commenced his famous designs illustrative of the history of humankind for the Neues Museum at Berlin, which were executed by his pupils and completed in 1860. They consist of six frescoes, representing The Tower of Babel, Homer and the Greeks, The Destruction of Jerusalem, The Battle of the Huns (German: Hunnenschlacht—a painting that inspired the 1857 symphonic poem Hunnenschlacht by Liszt), The Crusaders at the gates of Jerusalem, and The Age of the Reformation. The Destruction of Jerusalem was a copy of an earlier oil painting, much admired by Friedrich Wilhelm I of Prussia, which was by then already in the collection of Ludwig I of Bavaria.

These major tableaux, severally 30 feet long, and each comprising over one hundred figures above life-size, were surrounded by minor compositions, making more than twenty in all. The idea was to congregate around the world's historic dramas the prime agents of civilization; thus here were assembled allegoric figures of Architecture and other arts, of Science and other kingdoms of knowledge, together with lawgivers from the time of Moses, not forgetting Frederick the Great. The chosen situation for this imposing didactic and theatric display was the Treppenhaus or grand staircase in the Neues Museum, Berlin; the surface was a granulated, absorbent wall, specially prepared; the technical method was that known as "water-glass," or "liquid flint," the infusion of silica securing permanence. The same medium was adopted in the later murals in the Palace of Westminster. The staircase was severely damaged during the Second World War, and only traces of Kaulbach's work remain.

His perspicuous and showy manner also gained him abundant occupation as a book illustrator. Among his engraved designs are the Shakespeare gallery, the Goethe gallery and a folio edition of the Gospels. With regard to these examples of the Munich school, it was asserted that Kaulbach had been unfortunate alike in having found Cornelius for a master and King Ludwig for a patron, that he attempted subjects far beyond him, believing that his admiration for them was the same as inspiration; and supplied the lack of real imagination by a compound of intellect and fancy. Nevertheless, in such compositions as the Destruction of Jerusalem and the Battle of the Huns, Kaulbach shows creative imagination. As a dramatic poet, he tells the story, depicts character, seizes on action and situation, and thus as it were, takes the spectator by storm. The manner may be occasionally noisy and ranting, but the effect after its kind is tremendous. The cartoon, which, as usual in German art of the time, is superior to the ultimate picture, was executed in the artist's prime at the age of thirty. At this period, as here seen, the knowledge was little short of absolute; subtle is the sense of beauty; playful, delicate, firm the touch; the whole treatment artistic.

=== Late work ===
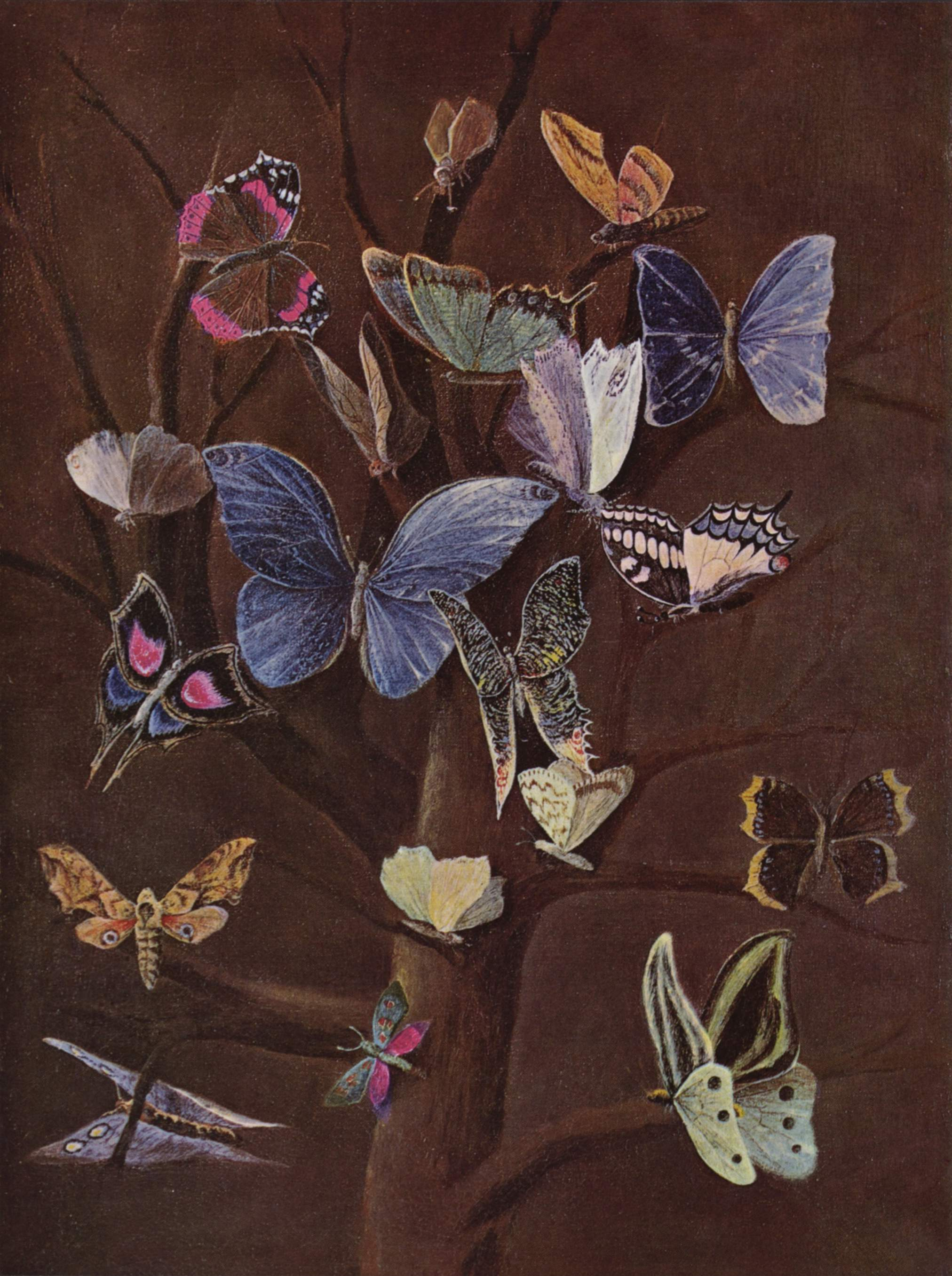
Schmetterlinge (Butterflies), c. 1860 (destroyed in 1945)

The painter's ultimate works stand conspicuous by exaggerations of earlier characteristics. The series of designs illustrative of Goethe, which had an immense success, were melodramatic and pandered to popular taste. The vast canvas, more than 30 ft. long, the Sea Fight at Salamis, painted for the Maximilianeum, Munich, evinces wonted imagination and facility in composition.

His fervent Protestantism – which alienated him in the latter part of his life from Cornelius, who was as decided a Catholic – is most strongly expressed in his Don Pedro de Arbuez, the Inquisitor, which, appearing at the time of the ecumenical council (1869-70), produced a great sensation, and gave rise to many controversies. Shortly before his death he was at work upon a large cartoon of The Deluge; and he had finished his St. Michael, the Patron Saint of Germany, in the garb of a heavenly messenger with a radiant air of triumph, and with Napoleon III and his son and several Jesuits cowering at his feet.

A trace has shown that he lived at Obere Garten Gasse 16½ in Munich around 1850. Kaulbach was elected a Foreign Honorary Member of the American Academy of Arts and Sciences in 1870. He died on 7 April 1874 in Munich and is buried there in the Alter Südfriedhof. His son Hermann (1846–1909) also became a distinguished painter.

== Style ==
Kaulbach's style was eclectic; in the Age of Homer the types and the treatment are derived from Greek marbles and vases; then in the Tower of Babel the severity of the antique gives place to the suavity of the Italian Renaissance; while in the Crusades the composition is let loose into modern Romanticism, and so the manner descends into the midst of the 20th century. And yet this scholastically compounded art is so nicely adjusted and smoothly blended that it casts off all incongruity and becomes homogeneous as the issue of one mind. But the public craved change; and so in later years Kaulbach's popularity declined, and he had to witness, not without inquietude, the rise of an opposing party of naturalism and realism. He is perhaps best known for his unusual representation of death, destruction and madness.
