= Greek academic art of the 19th century =

The most important artistic movement of Greek art in the 19th century was academic realism, often called in Greece "the Munich School" (Greek: Σχολή του Μονάχου) because of the strong influence from the Royal Academy of Fine Arts of Munich (German: Münchner Akademie der Bildenden Künste), where many Greek artists trained. The Munich School painted the same sort of scenes in the same sort of style as Western European academic painters in several countries, and did generally not attempt to incorporate Byzantine stylistic elements into their work.

== History ==
The creation of romantic art in Greece can be explained mainly due to the particular relationships that were created between recently liberated Greece (1830) and Bavaria during King Otto's years (see: Kingdom of Greece). In this period the Greek state was encouraging young artists to study at the Royal Academy of Fine Arts in Munich and in particular study painting. In addition, after centuries of Ottoman rule, few opportunities existed for young artist in Greece itself, immediately after independence, so studying abroad was imperative for them. Munich was an important international center for the arts and was the place where the majority of Greek artists of the 19th century would choose to study; a minority would go to Paris. Both academic and personal bonds developed between early Greek painters and Munich artistry, giving birth to the Greek "Munich School" of painting. Many of these young artists later returned to Greece to teach at the Polytechnic School and later Athens School of Fine Arts, where they would transmit their artistic experiences. Some of them, like Nikolaus Gysis, chose to remain in Munich, the so-called Athens on the Isar.

== Artistic styles ==
The works of the Munich school painters are characterized by an expert but over-use of colours that would overshadow the figures' expressions. Scenes were depicted in a pompous and theatrical way, although not lacking in emotional tension. In academic realism the imperative is the ethography, the representation of urban and/or rural life with a special attention in the depiction of architectural elements, the traditional cloth and the various objects. Munich School painters were specialized on portraiture, landscape painting and still life.

== Representative artists ==
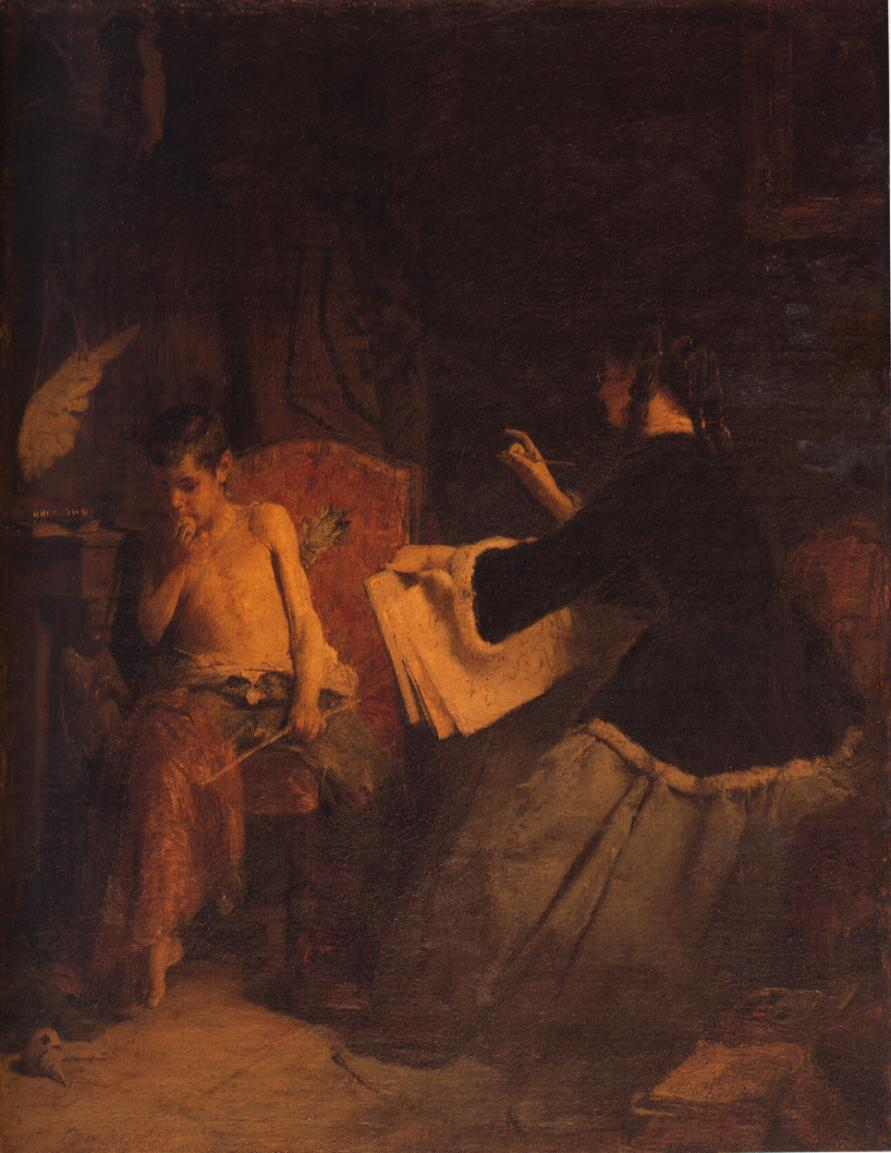
Nikolaus Gysis, Eros and the Painter.

Artists belonging to the Munich School include the first painters of free Greece, such as Theodoros Vryzakis (1814–1878) and Dionysios Tsokos (1820–1862). According to other art critics, the latter belongs more to the Heptanese School. Both of them draw their subjects from the Greek War of Independence in 1821, focusing on idealised ideas on the Greek Revolution and not giving much attention to the violent and tragic aspects of a war. Even more dramatic in their depictions were the later Konstantinos Volanakis (1837–1907) and Ioannis Altamouras (1852–1878), who were focused more on the naval battles of the 1821 Revolution.

Apart from Volanakis, the main representatives of this artistic movement were painters from the second half of the 19th century, such as Nikiphoros Lytras (1832–1904), Nikolaos Gysis (1842–1901), Georgios Iacovidis (1853–1907) and Georgios Roilos (1867–1928). In his mature career Roilos went beyond the principles of the Munich School and introduced impressionism into Greek painting. Gysis stayed at the Academy in Germany while the others have returned to teach at the Athens School of Fine Arts. Their teaching and artistry have marked the 19th-century artistic era in Greece.

Nikiphoros Lytras is considered the pope of Greek painting and the major iconographer of Greek life during the 19th century. Paintings such as The milkman or The awaiting consist reference points in Greek art. Gysis worked mainly on ethography while at the maturity of his career he shifted towards the iconography of visions, allegories and symbolisms. The paintings of Georgios Iacovidis consisted mainly of portraits and scenes depicting children. The latter was the founder and first curator of the National Gallery of Greece in Athens.

Other painters include Epameinondas Thomopoulos (1878–1976), Ioannis Koutsis (1860−1953), Stylianos Miliadis (1881−1965), Nikolaos Vokos (1854–1902), Ioannis Zacharias (1845–?) and Polychronis Lembesis (1848–1913). Influences of academic realism can also be seen in the work of many Greek artists such as Spyridon Vikatos (1878–1960), Nikolaos Davis (1883–1967), Thalia Flora-Karavia (1871–1960), Ioannis Doukas (1841–1916) and Ektor Doukas (1886–1969).

The end of the movement started when some Greek painters after the mid-19th century such as Periclis Pantazis (1849–1884) departed from academic realism towards impressionism and the final end occurred when expressionist Nikolaos Lytras (1883–1927), Georgios Roilos, and Konstantinos Parthenis (1878–1967) started to teach at the Athens School of Fine Arts.

== Gallery ==
Constantinos Volanakis, Anchored boats.

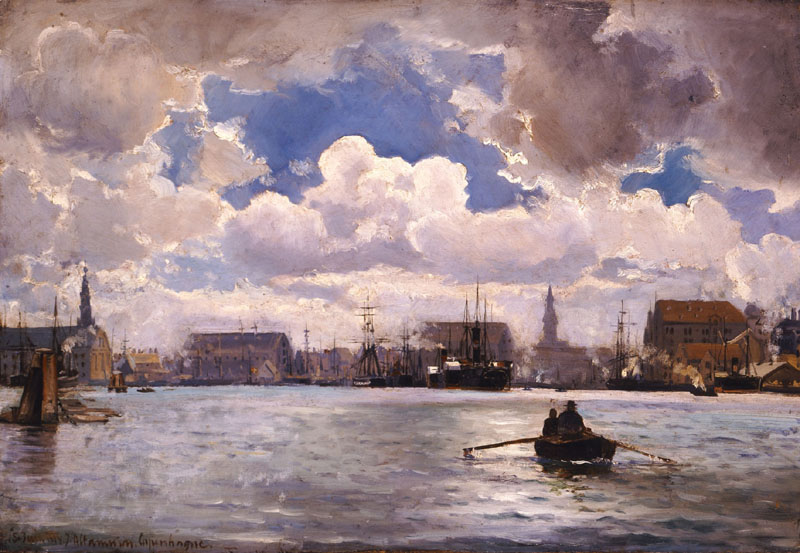
Ioannis Altamouras, The port of Copenhagen.

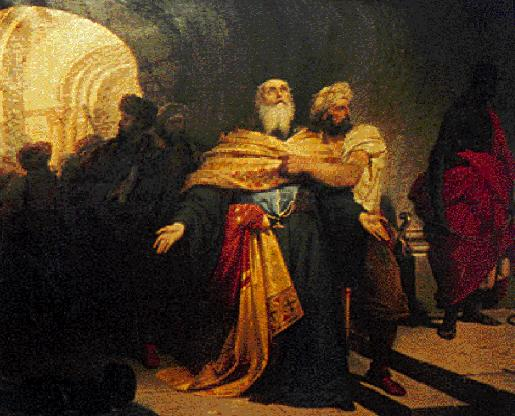
Nikiphoros Lytras, Execution of Patriarch Gregory V of Constantinople.

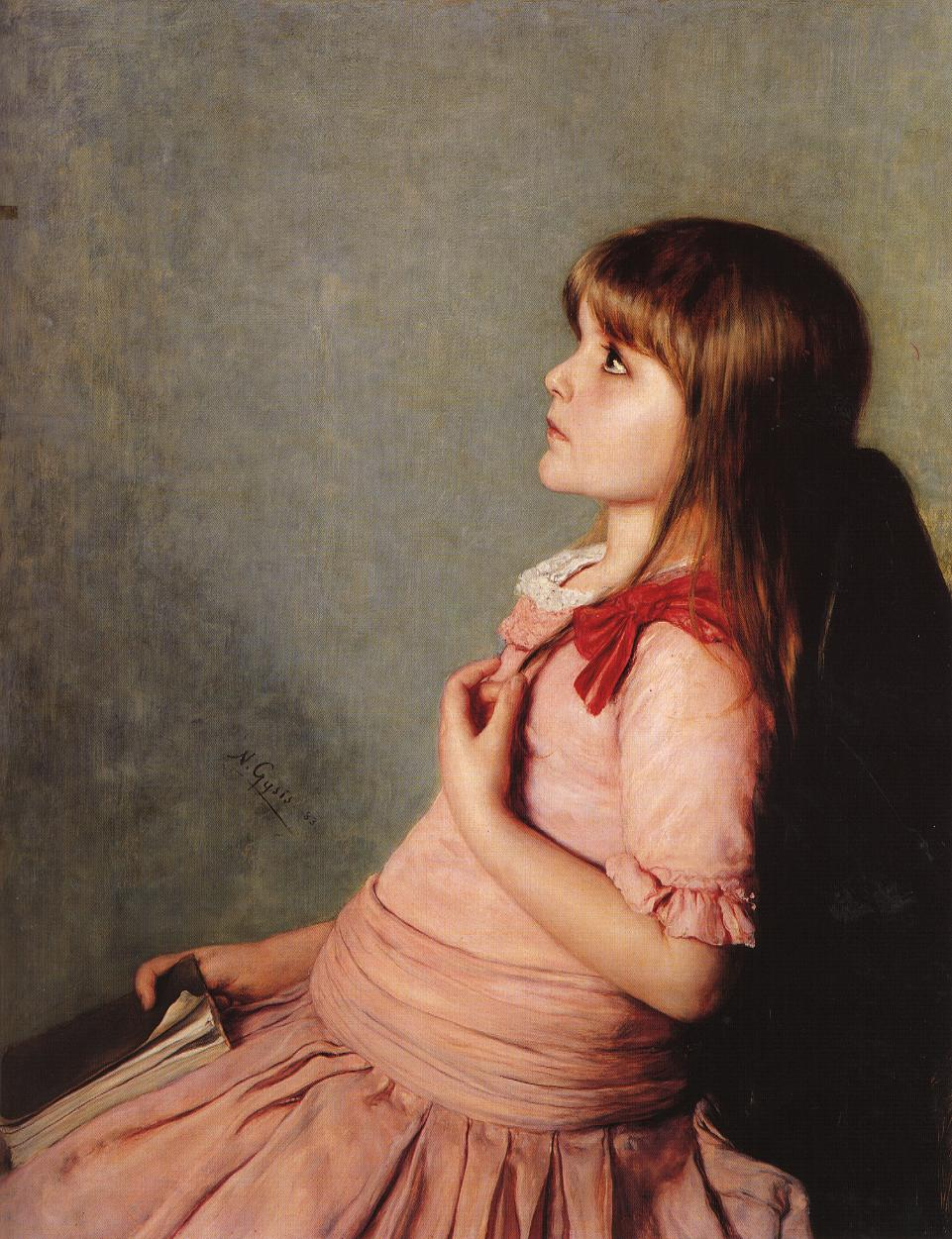
Nikolaus Gyzis, Learning by heart.

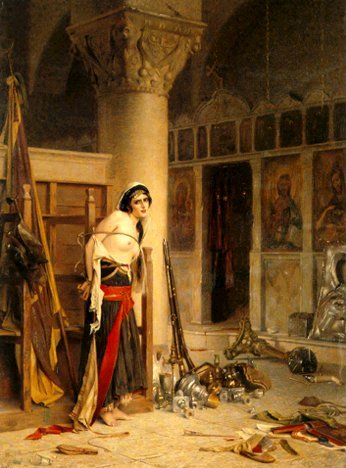
Theodoros Rallis, The Booty.

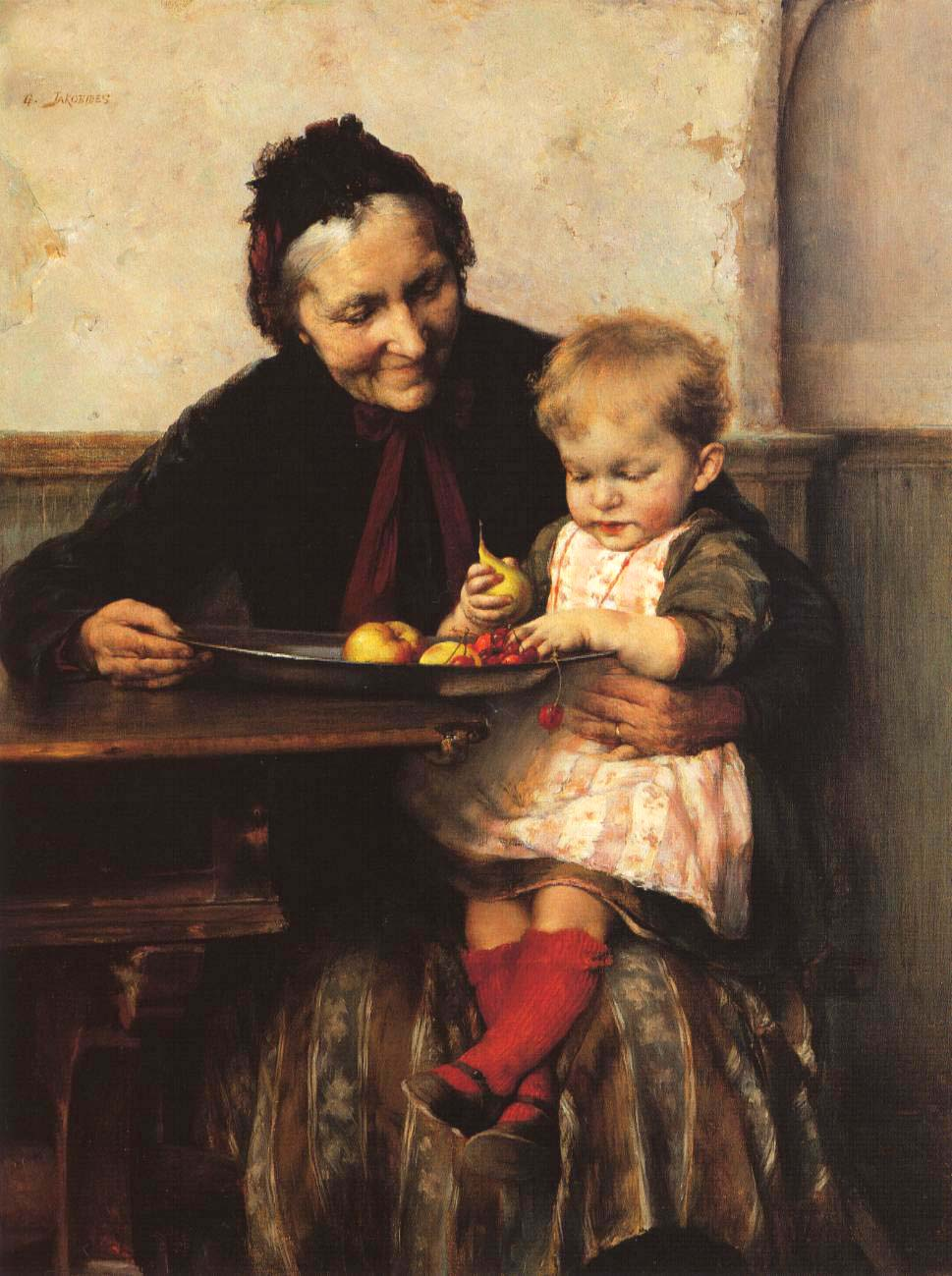
Georgios Jakobides, Grandma's Favorite.

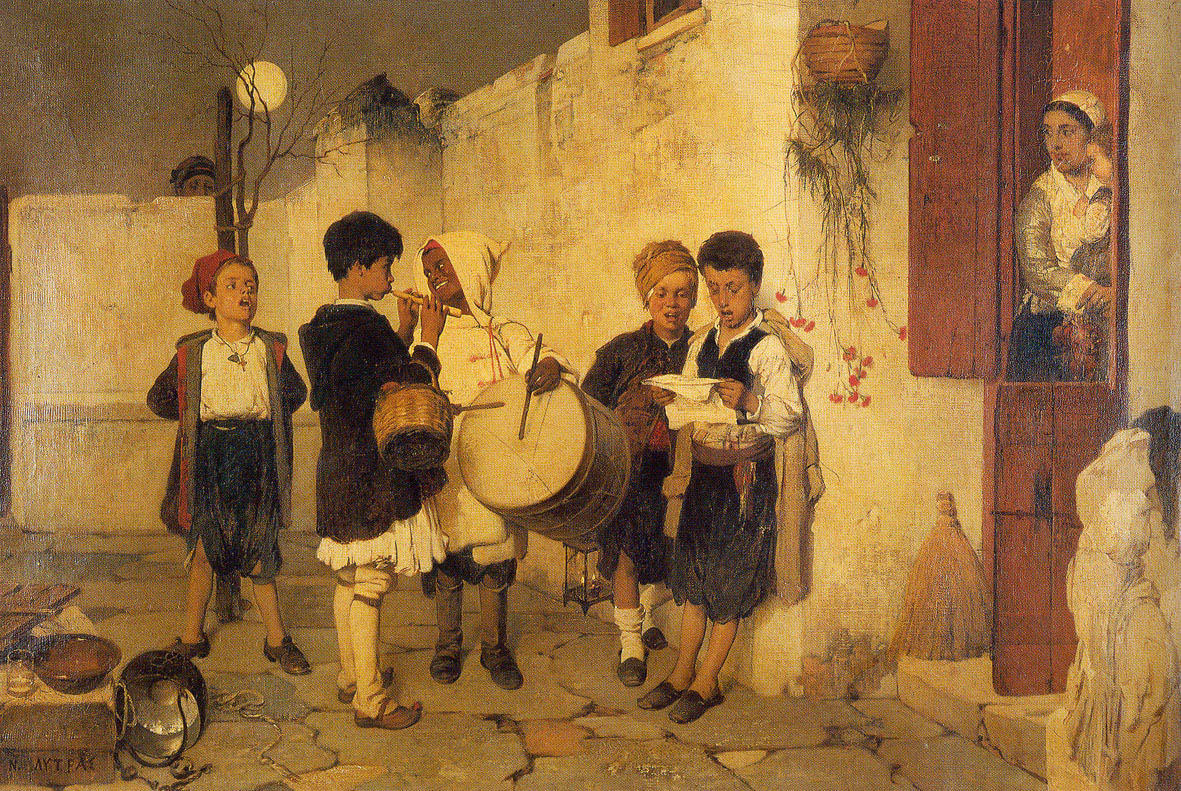
Nikiphoros Lytras, Carols.

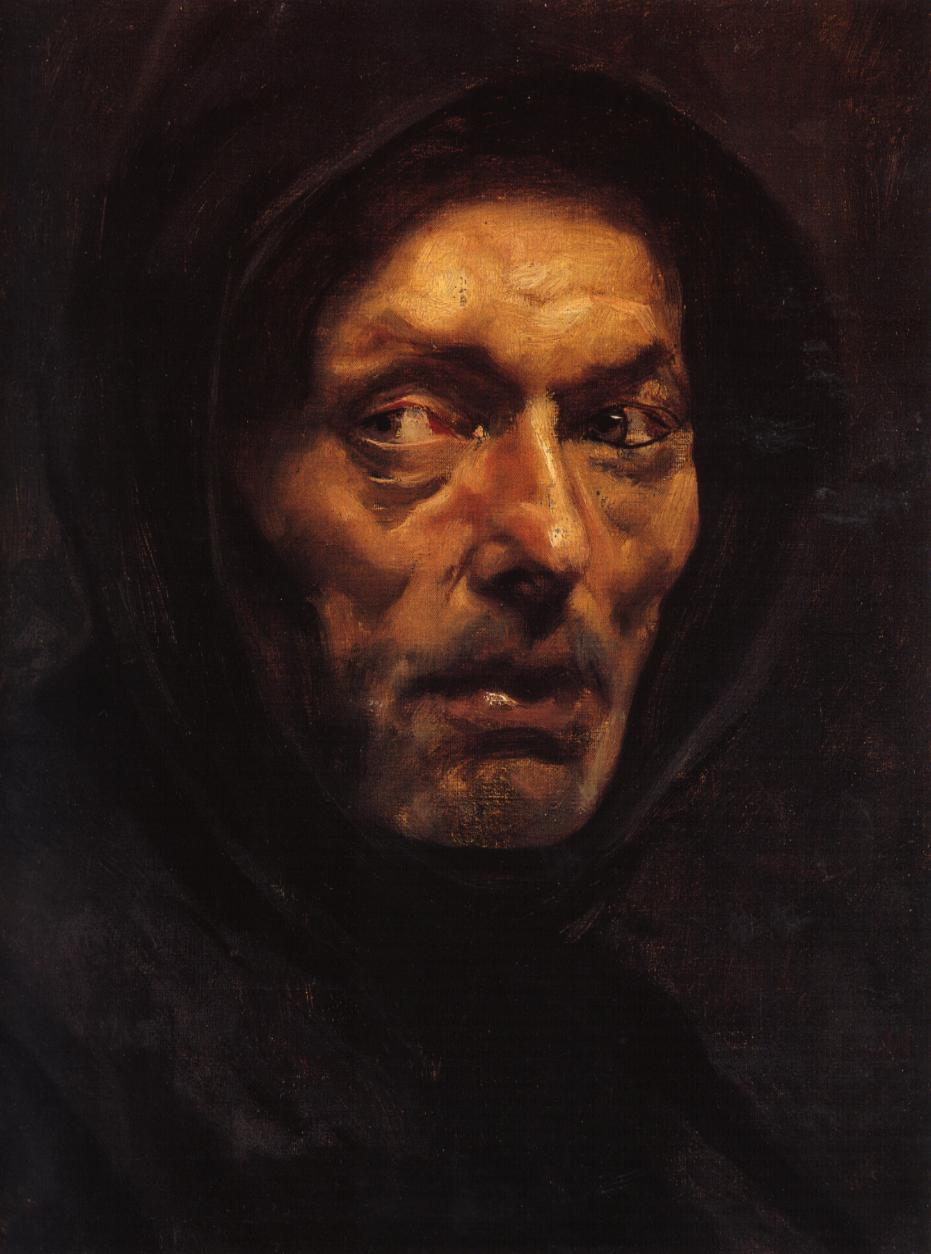
Nikolaus Gyzis, Capuchin friar.

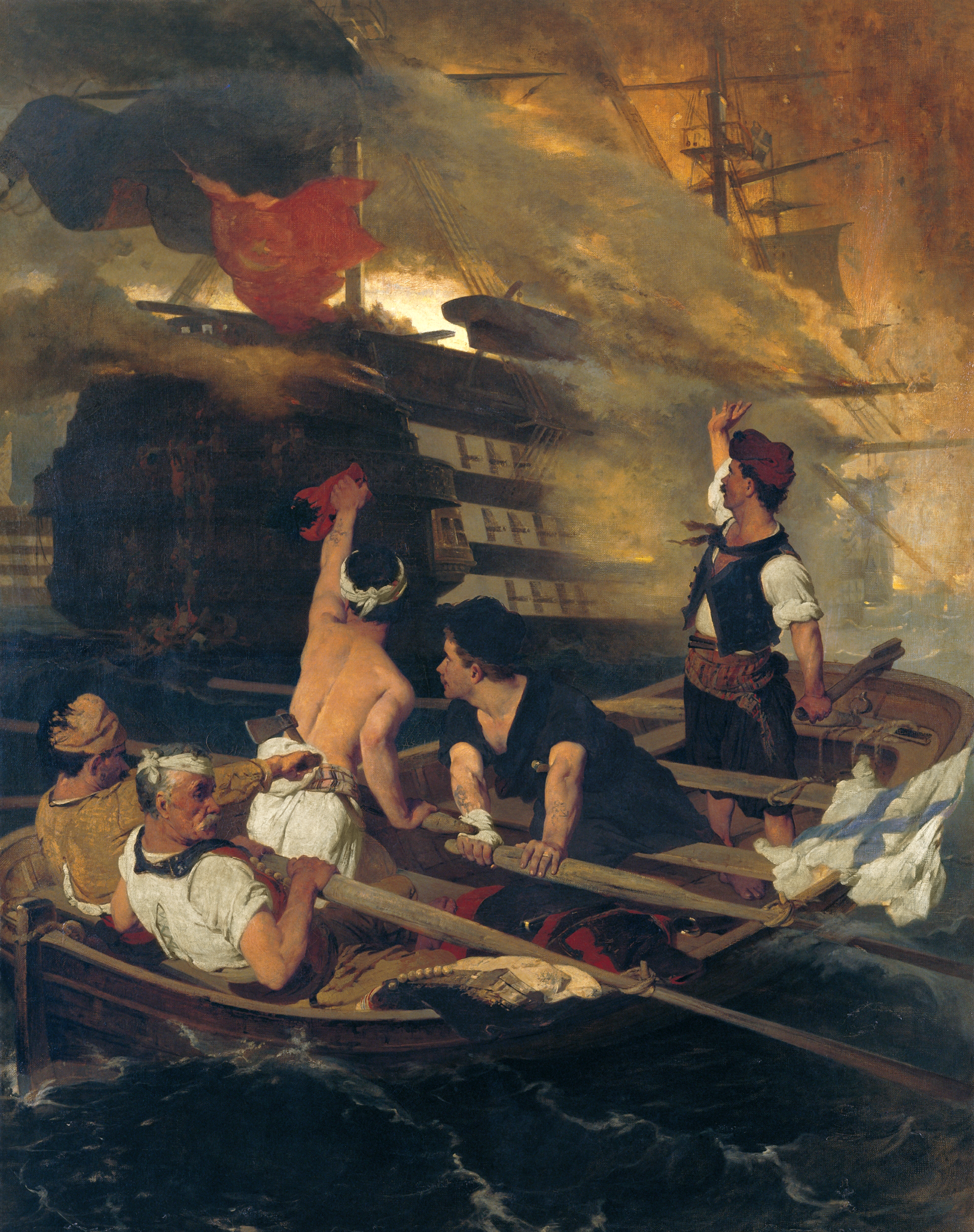
Nikiphoros Lytras, The blowing up of the Nasuh Ali Pasha's flagship by Kanaris.

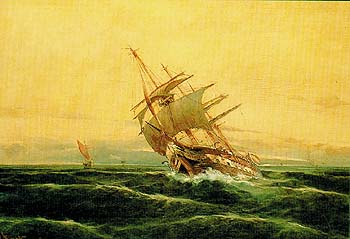
Vassileios Chatzis, Boat in rough waters.

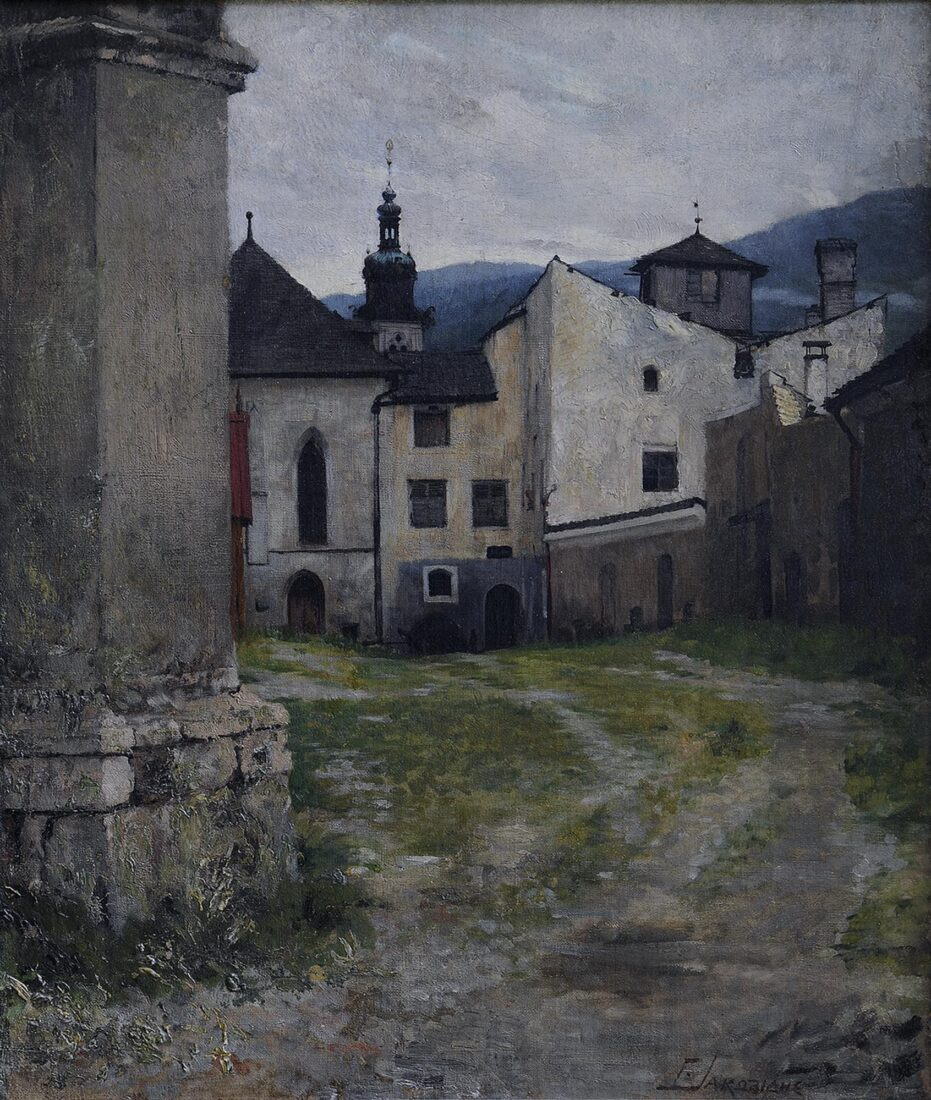
Georgios Jakobides, Bavarian village.

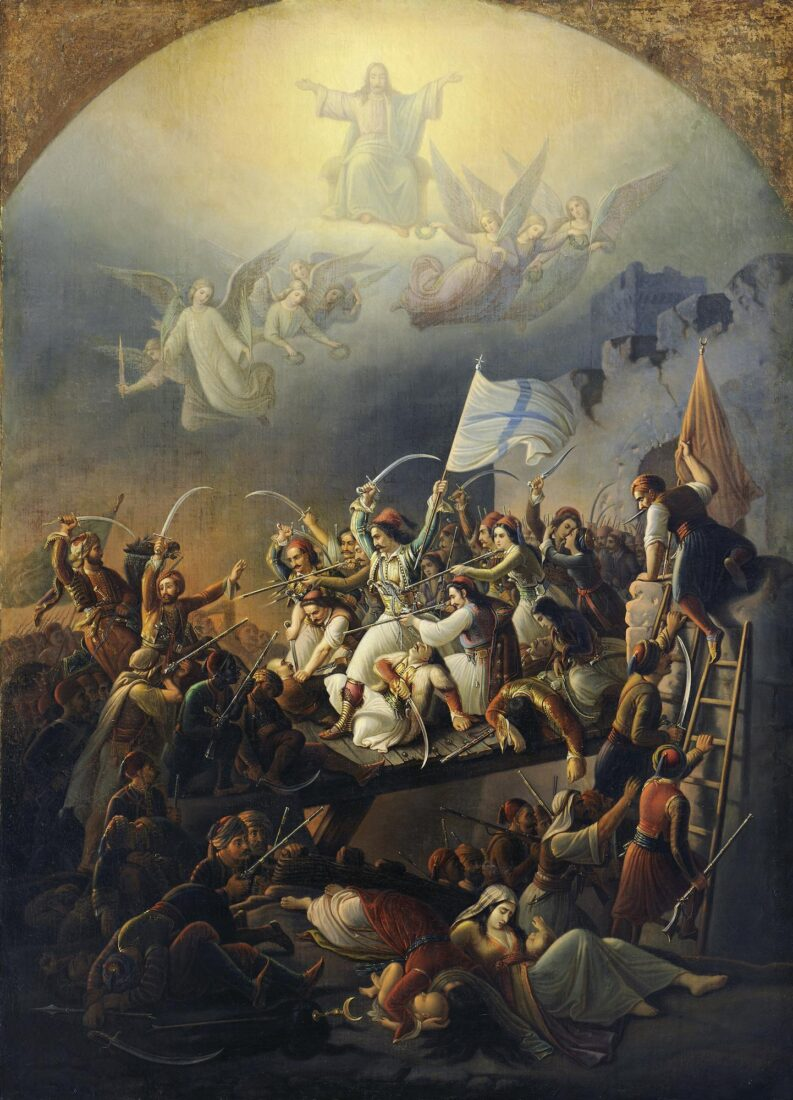
Theodoros Vryzakis, The sortie of Messologhi.

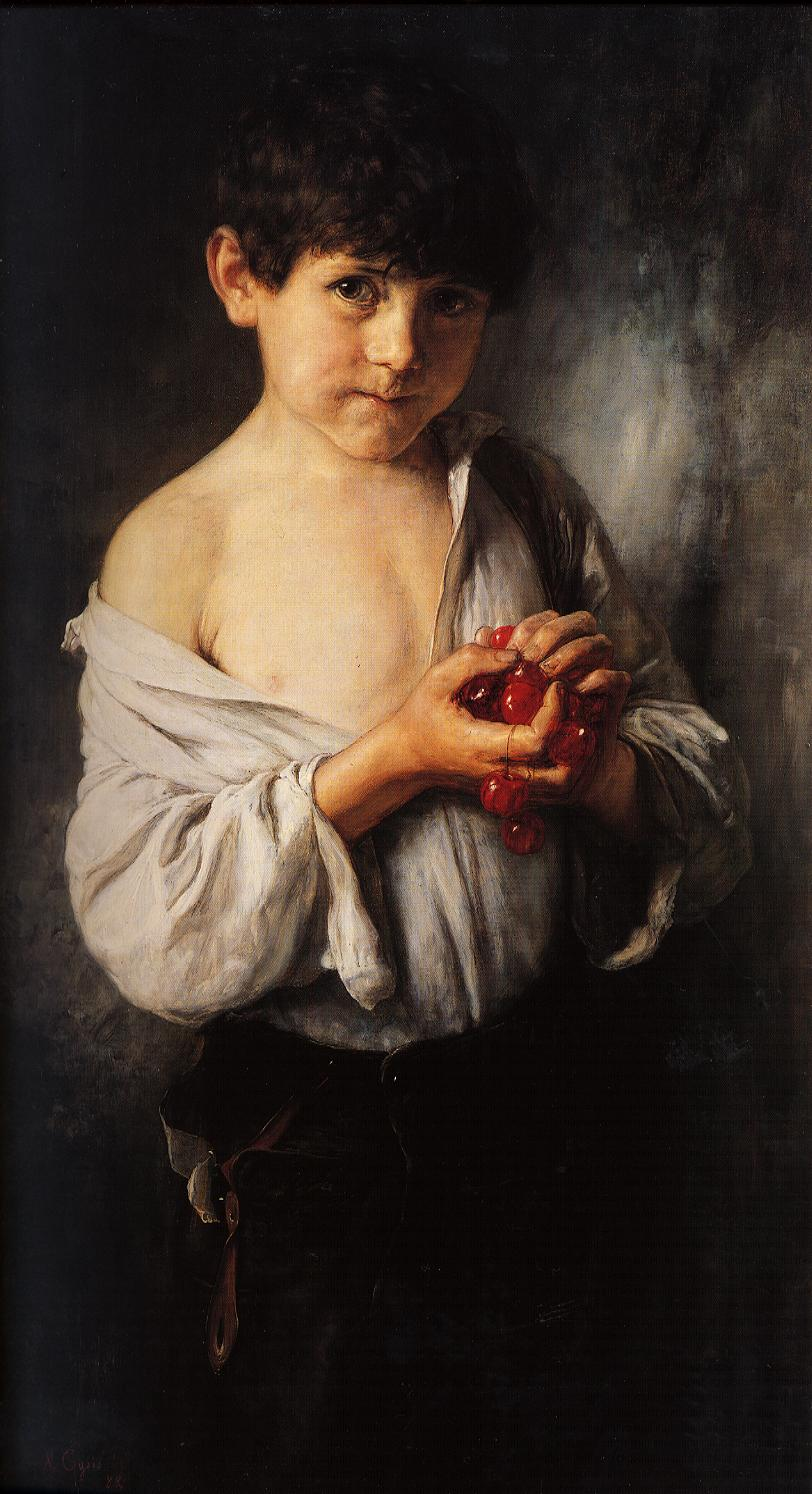
Nikolaus Gysis, Boy with cherries.

== See also ==
- Art in modern Greece
- National Gallery of Athens
- Greek Art
