= Greek Orthodox Church of the Annunciation, Manchester =

- Greek: Ιερός Ναός Ευαγγελισμού της Θεοτόκου
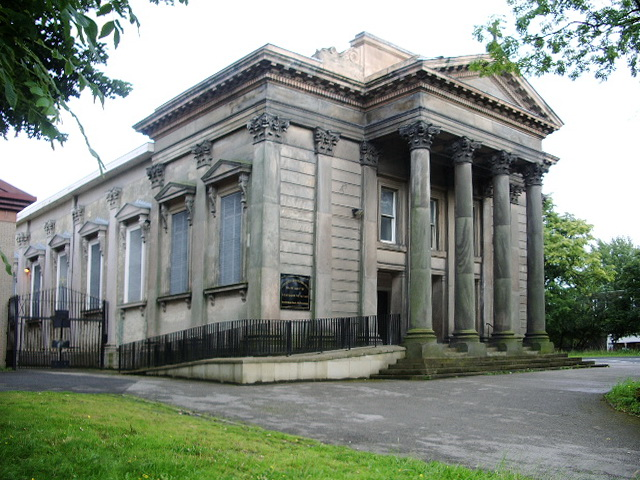
- The Greek Orthodox Church of the Annunciation in Salford, Greater Manchester is the oldest purpose-built Greek Orthodox Church in England
- Greek Orthodox Church of the Annunciation, Manchester
- 53.506386°N 2.2602526°W
- OS grid reference: SD 82842 01112
- Location: Bury New Road; Salford, Greater Manchester; M7 4EY
- Country: England
- Denomination: Greek Orthodox Church
- Website: greekchurchofmanchester.org

History
- Founded: October 1861
- Consecrated: 1861

Architecture
- Functional status: Active
- Heritage designation: Grade II Listed building
- Designated: 1980
- Architect(s): Clegg & Knowles
- Style: Classical architecture
- Groundbreaking: 1860
- Completed: 1861

Administration
- Archdiocese: Greek Orthodox Archdiocese of Thyateira and Great Britain

The Greek Orthodox Church of the Annunciation, Manchester (Greek: Ιερός Ναός Ευαγγελισμού της Θεοτόκου) is a Greek Orthodox church in Salford, Greater Manchester. Completed in 1861 in a classical architectural style, it is the oldest purpose-built Greek Orthodox church in England and since 1980, a grade II listed building for its “special architectural or historic interest”. As of 2017 the church provides liturgies on Sundays and acts as a hub for a community of an estimated 2,500 Greek diaspora, particularly Greek Cypriots, British Cypriots and Greek students in Manchester.

A church hall annexe is used for a Greek community school with over 100 pupils studying the culture of Greece, history of Greece and Greek language. The church hall is also used to celebrate events in the calendar of saints and the liturgical year such as Easter, Christmas and other traditions of the Eastern Orthodox Church.

== Architecture, building and artworks ==
The church building is located on the Bury New Road (A56) in Broughton, Salford, and was designed by the architects Clegg & Knowles who also designed many of the commercial warehouses in Manchester. The foundation stone for the Church of the Annunciation was laid in 1860 and the building was finally completed a year later in 1861 with a classical basilica. The icons on the iconostasis were painted by Theodoros Vryzakis, a key figure in Greek academic art of the 19th century whose work is also exhibited in the National Art Gallery – Alexandros Soutzos Museum in Athens, Greece. The Pevsner Architectural Guide for Lancashire describes the carving in the church as “uncommonly well done” and the main building as:

A demonstration of the wealth of the 19th century Greek community. Elegant, powerful and purposeful, making a great show.

The church was initially built with a domed ceiling and a mural depicting Christ Pantocrator painted by C. D. Duval in 1870 but this was replaced by a pitched roof in 1962 after dry rot destroyed the original. The front of the church is made of channelled ashlar with a three bay Corinthian order portico with a modillion cornice. The sides of the church have Corinthian pilasters, windows with pediments and the original polygonal apse can be found at the back of the building. Renovations to the stainless steel roof, slating, lintels, leadwork and masonry were funded by English Heritage and the Heritage Lottery Fund with work undertaken from 2009 onwards.

The church building was first listed by Historic England on 18 January 1980 and under the Planning (Listed Buildings and Conservation Areas) Act 1990 as amended for its special architectural or historic interest. An annexe was built to accommodate a school and serves as a church hall for other events.

== Administration and clergy ==
The church is part of the Greek Orthodox Archdiocese of Thyateira and Great Britain of the Ecumenical Patriarchate of Constantinople. As of 2017 the Manchester community is served by The Reverend Presbyter Demetrios Kontelides, who succeeded the Archimandrite Nicolaos Sergakis.

Several priests (παπάς) have served the Greek community in Manchester since 1800, most notably Protopresbyter (Archpriest) Konstantinos Kallinikos (Κωνσταντίνος Καλλίνικος) from 1904 to his death in 1940. Kallinikos was honoured with the title of Grand Oikonomos (Μέγας Οικονόμος) by the Patriarch of Constantinople, awarded an honorary doctorate of Theology from the National and Kapodistrian University of Athens and granted the Order of the Redeemer for his services by George I of Greece.

== History of Manchester's Greek community ==
The Greek community in Manchester was started in the early 19th century by emigrants from the Aegean island of Chios after the Chios massacre. Many of the first immigrants were traders of mastic who fled Turkish oppression during the Greek War of Independence. In April 1843 the community passed a vote for the creation of a Greek centre of worship in Manchester.

From 1843 to 1860 improvised churches were used for worship, including sites on Waterloo Road in the Strangeways area, a venue on Cheetham Hill Road and a chapel on Wellington Street. The growing Greek and Cypriot community in Manchester meant that a more permanent residence was required and a site in Broughton was acquired where building work started in 1860.

From the 1950s to 1970s the community grew further as more Greek-Cypriots emigrated to Manchester from Cyprus, some in response to the Turkish invasion of Cyprus and ongoing Cyprus dispute. As of 2009 there were an estimated 2,500 Greeks in Manchester, part of a total of 340,000 Greek nationals and people of Greek ancestry living in the UK recorded by the United Kingdom Census 2011 and the Office for National Statistics (ONS). Around 150 to 200 people attend Sunday services at the church in Broughton.

The church celebrated its 150th anniversary on Sunday 9 May 2010 with a sermon by the Archbishop of Thyateira Gregorios (Theocharous).
