= Koutsis =

Koutsis (Greek: Κούτσης) is a Greek surname. Notable people with the surname include:

- Giorgos Koutsis (born 1973), Greek footballer
- Ioannis Koutsis (1860−1953), Greek painter
- Ioannis Koutsis (1908−unknown), Greek Olympic sports shooter
- Steven Koutsis, American diplomat
