= Philhellenism =

19th-century intellectual movement

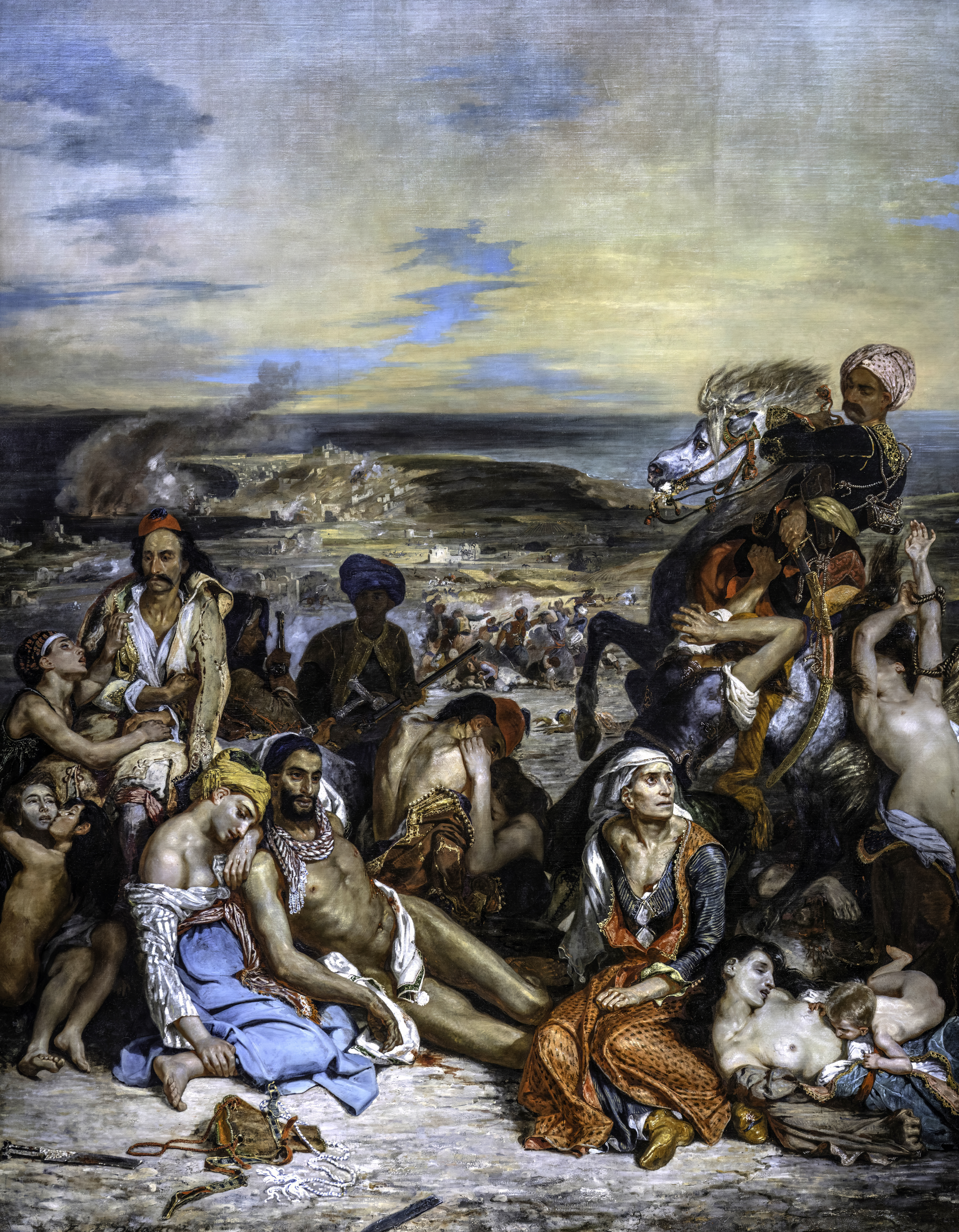
The Massacre at Chios by Eugène Delacroix reflects the attitudes of French philhellenism.

Philhellenism ("the love of Greek culture and art") was a prominent intellectual movement which promoted Greek culture. It contributed to the sentiments that led Europeans such as Lord Byron, Charles Nicolas Fabvier and Richard Church to advocate for Greek independence from the Ottoman Empire.

The later 19th-century European philhellenism was largely found among the Classicists. The study of it falls under Classical Reception Studies and is a continuation of the Classical tradition.

== Antiquity ==
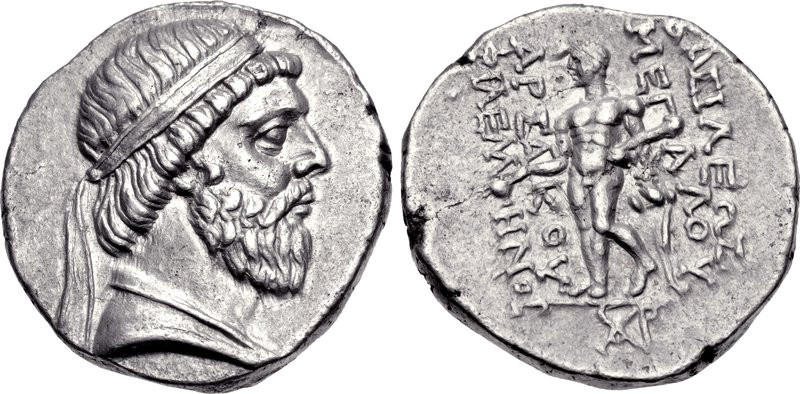
Coin of Mithridates I of Parthia from the mint at Seleucia on the Tigris. The Greek inscription reads ΒΑΣΙΛΕΩΣ ΜΕΓΑΛΟΥ ΑΡΣΑΚΟΥ ΦΙΛΕΛΛΗΝΟΣ ("[coin] of the great king Arsaces, friend of the Greeks")

In antiquity, the term philhellene ("the admirer of Greeks and everything Greek"), from the (Greek: φιλέλλην, from φίλος - philos, "friend", "lover" + Ἕλλην - Hellen, "Greek") was used to describe both non-Greeks who were fond of ancient Greek culture and Greeks who patriotically upheld their culture. The Liddell-Scott Greek-English Lexicon defines 'philhellene' as "fond of the Hellenes, mostly of foreign princes, as Amasis; of Parthian kings[...]; also of Hellenic tyrants, as Jason of Pherae and generally of Hellenic (Greek) patriots. According to Xenophon, an honorable Greek should also be a philhellene.

Some examples:

- Evagoras of Cyprus and Philip II were both called "philhellenes" by Isocrates
- The early rulers of the Parthian Empire, starting with Mithridates I (r. 171–132 BC), used the title of philhellenes on their coins, which was a political act done in order to establish friendly relations with their Greek subjects.
- Following the example of the Parthians, Tigranes adopted the title of Philhellene (friend of the Greeks). The layout of his capital Tigranocerta was an example of Greek architecture.

=== Roman philhellenes ===
The literate upper classes of Ancient Rome were increasingly Hellenized in their culture during the 3rd century BC.

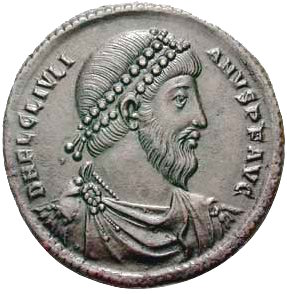
Emperor Julian

Among Romans the career of Titus Quinctius Flamininus (died 174 BC), who appeared at the Isthmian Games in Corinth in 196 BC and proclaimed the freedom of the Greek states, was fluent in Greek, stood out, according to Livy, as a great admirer of Greek culture. The Greeks hailed him as their liberator. There were some Romans during the late Republic, who were distinctly anti-Greek, resenting the increasing influence of Greek culture on Roman life, an example being the Roman Censor, Cato the Elder and Cato the Younger, who lived during the "Greek invasion" of Rome but towards the later years of his life he eventually became a philhellene after his stay in Rhodes.

The lyric poet Quintus Horatius Flaccus, often anglicized as Horace, was another philhellene. He is notable for his words, "Graecia capta ferum victorem cepit et artis intulit agresti Latio" (Conquered Greece took captive her savage conqueror and brought her arts into rustic Latium), meaning that after the conquest of Greece the defeated Greeks created a cultural hegemony over the Romans.

Horace's contemporary lyric poets, Virgil and Ovid, both produced magnum opuses (the Aeneid and the Metamorphoses, respectively) which were substantially founded upon Hellenic references and culture. Additionally, Virgil's Eclogues were inspired by Theocritus' earlier pastoral poetry in his idylls. The Aeneid, Virgil's story of Rome's founding myth, notably shares several similarities with Homer's earlier epics, particularly the Odyssey, one of which being both his epic and the Odyssey follow a demigod protagonist's military voyage after the Trojan War. It also was influenced by Homer's Iliad; for example, the ekphrasis of Achilles' divine shield from his mother, Thetis, was mirrored by the ekphrasis of Aeneas' divine shield from his mother, Venus. Ovid's work was perhaps even more influenced by ancient Greek culture than Virgil; his Metamorphoses were inspired by the Greek epic tradition and metamorphosis poetry in the Hellenistic tradition, and its content was derived to a large extent from Greek myth and folklore, including the Trojan War. Ovid's treatment of Greek myths was so impactful for later Philhellenism, especially during the Renaissance, that the well-known versions of some myths are actually Ovid's versions (e.g. Echo and Narcissus). Soon after these writers, other Roman lyric poets such as Lucan (inspired by Greek epics with his Pharsalia) or Persius (heavily inspired by Horace with his Life) continued to exhibit strong interests and admirations for Greek literary, artistic, and religious culture.

Roman emperors known for their philhellenism include Nero, Hadrian, Marcus Aurelius and Julian the Apostate.

== Modern times ==
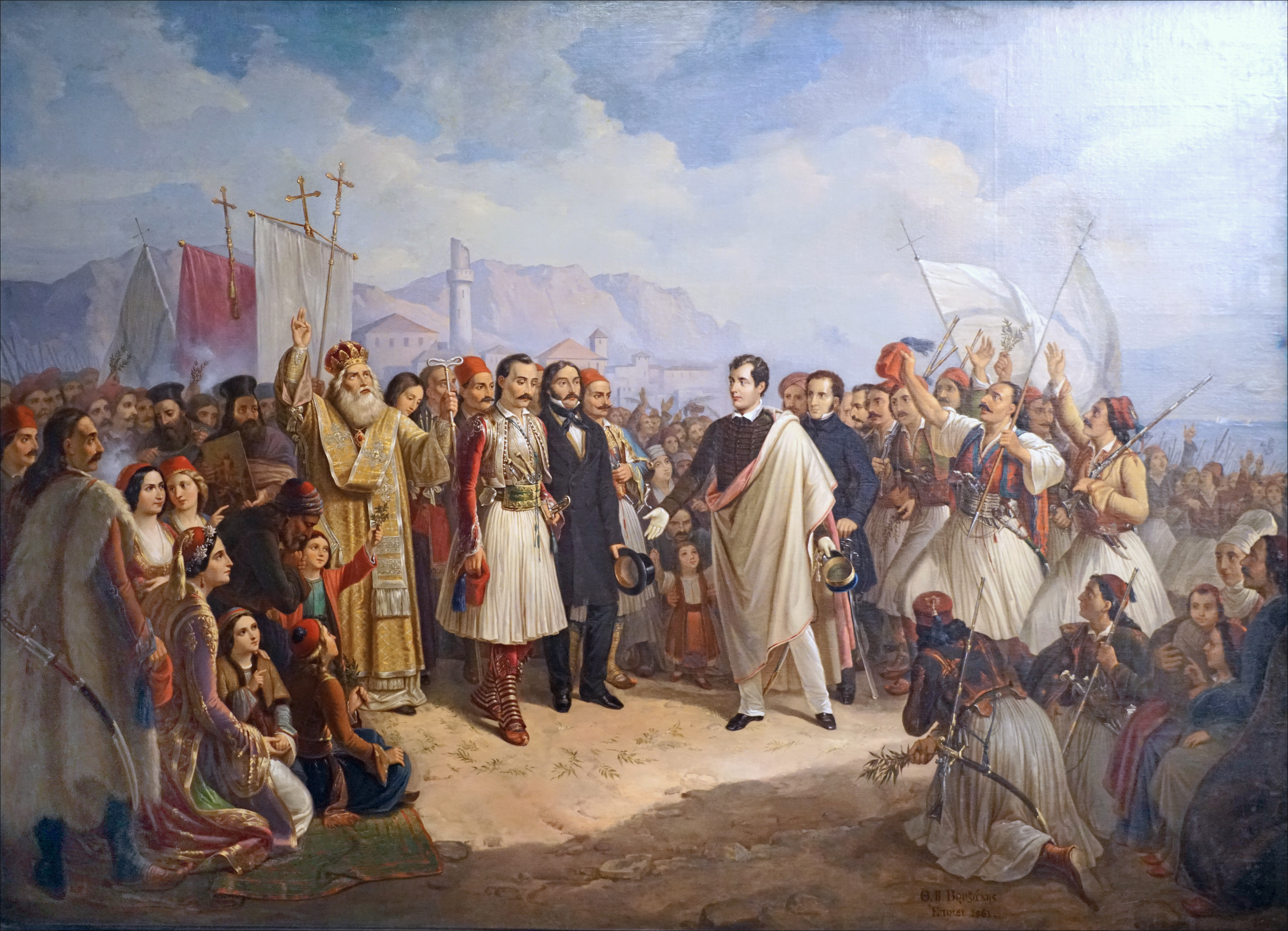
The Reception of Lord Byron at Missolonghi by Theodoros Vryzakis

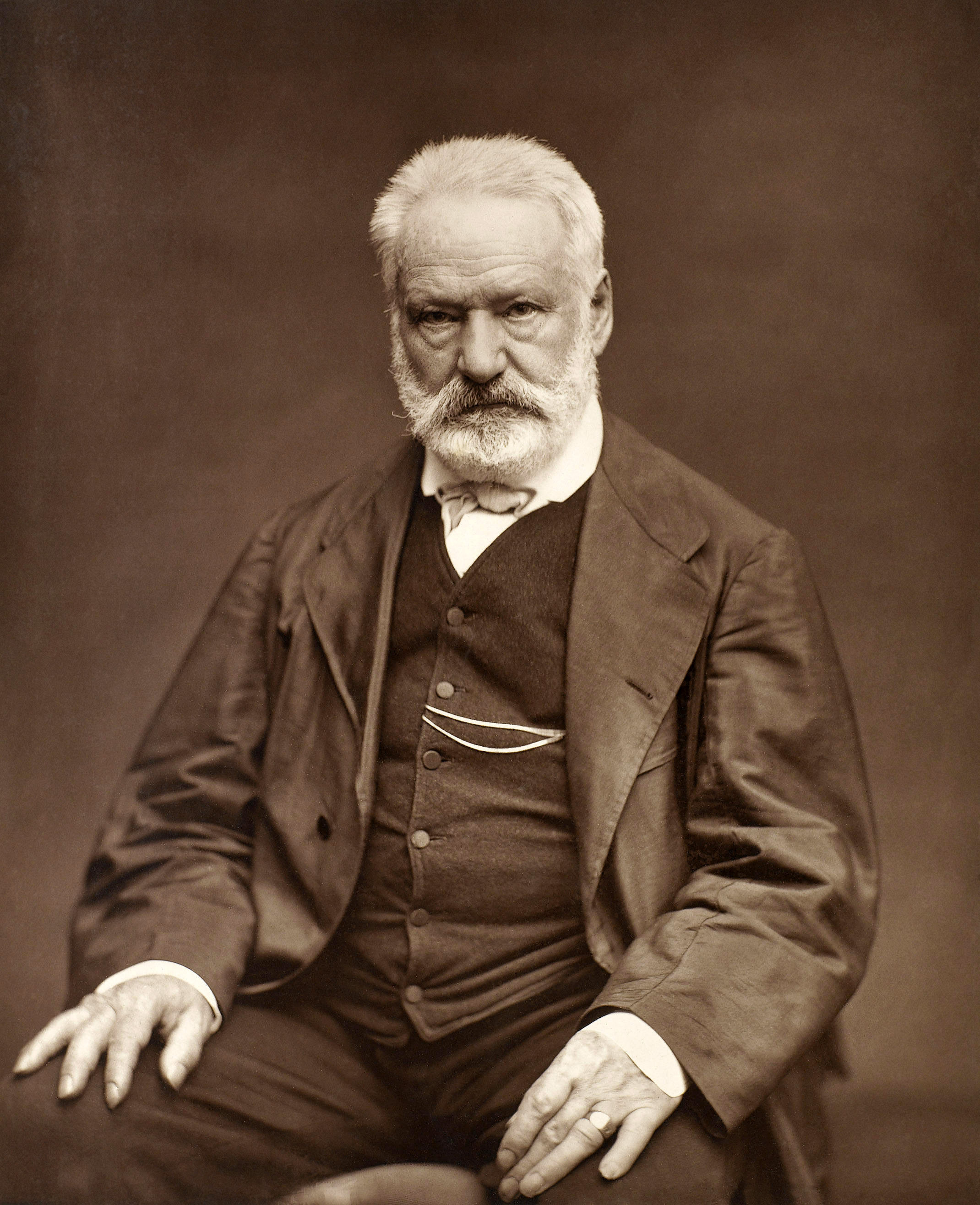
Victor Hugo, a well-known philhellene

In the period of political reaction and repression after the fall of Napoleon, when the liberal-minded, educated and prosperous middle and upper classes of European societies found the Romantic nationalism of 1789–1792 repressed by the restoration of absolute monarchy at home, the idea of the re-creation of a Greek state on the very territories that were sanctified by their view of Antiquity—which was reflected even in the furnishings of their own parlors and the contents of their bookcases—offered an ideal, set at a romantic distance. Under these conditions, the Greek uprising constituted a source of inspiration and expectations that could never actually be fulfilled, disappointing what Paul Cartledge called "the Victorian self-identification with the Glory that was Greece". American higher education was fundamentally transformed by the rising admiration of and identification with ancient Greece in the 1830s and afterward.

Another popular subject of interest in Greek culture at the turn of the 19th century was the shadowy Scythian philosopher Anacharsis, who lived in the 6th century BC. The new prominence of Anacharsis was sparked by Jean-Jacques Barthélemy's fanciful Travels of Anacharsis the Younger in Greece (1788), a learned imaginary travel journal, one of the first historical novels, which a modern scholar has called "the encyclopedia of the new cult of the antique" in the late 18th century. It had a high impact on the growth of philhellenism in France: the book went through many editions, was reprinted in the United States and was translated into German and other languages. It later inspired European sympathy for the Greek War of Independence and spawned sequels and imitations throughout the 19th century.

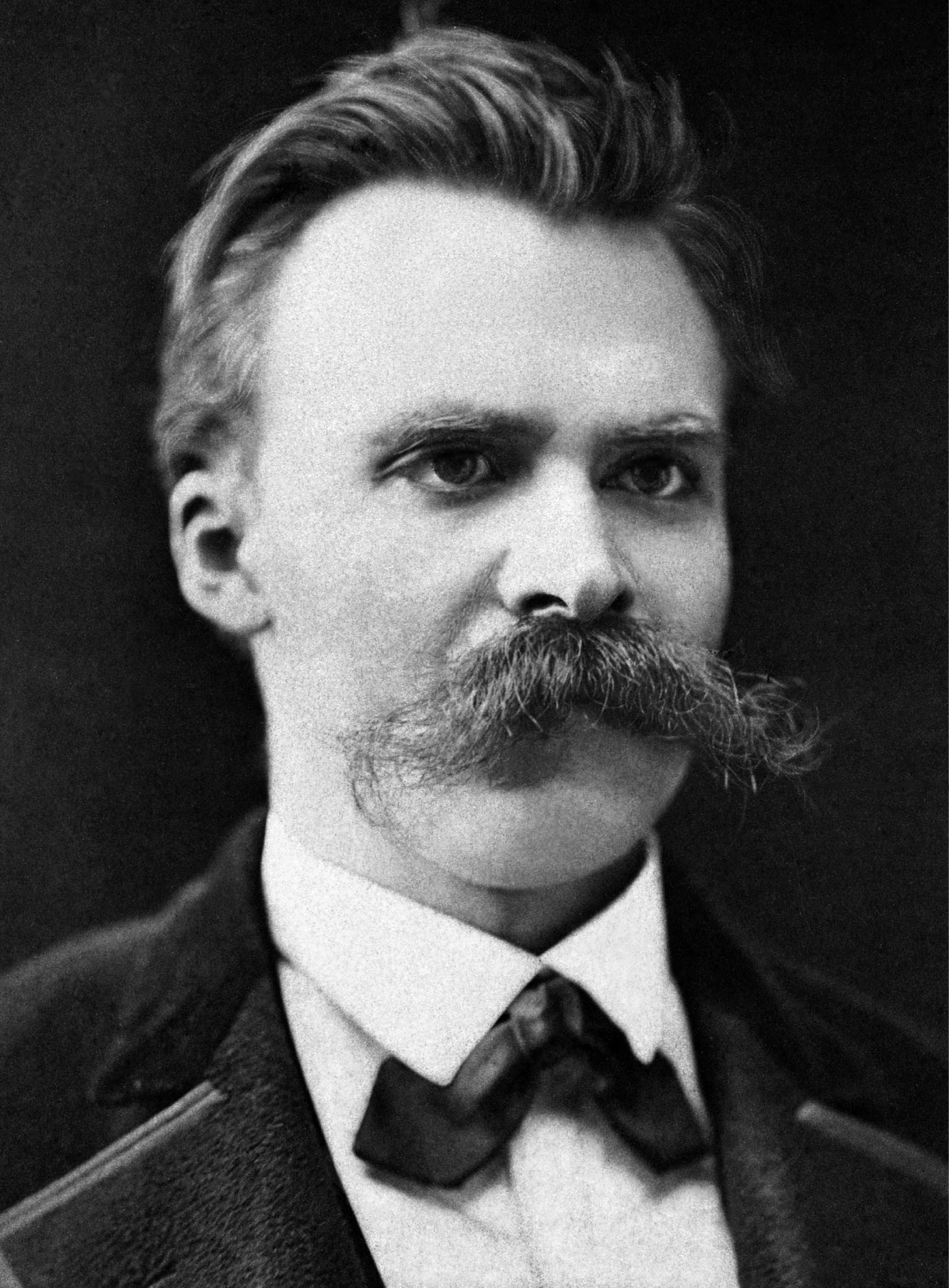
Friedrich Nietzsche, was one of the most staunch philhellenes. He wrote that: "the Greek is the man who has achieved the most", "the Greek people are the only people of genius in the history of the world", "the Greeks have never been overestimated", "the Greek antiquity is the only true home of culture" and that "the Greek world is seen as the one truly profound possibility of life". Nietzsche was convinced that "the knowledge of the great Greeks" educated him.

In German culture the first phase of philhellenism can be traced in the careers and writings of Johann Joachim Winckelmann, one of the inventors of art history, Friedrich August Wolf, who inaugurated modern Homeric scholarship with his Prolegomena ad Homerum (1795) and the enlightened bureaucrat Wilhelm von Humboldt. It was also in this context that Johann Wolfgang von Goethe and Friedrich Hölderlin were to compose poetry and prose in the field of literature, elevating Hellenic themes in their works. One of the most renowned German philhellenes of the 19th century was Friedrich Nietzsche. In the German states, the private obsession with ancient Greece took public forms, institutionalizing an elite philhellene ethos through the Gymnasium, to revitalize German education at home, and providing on two occasions high-minded philhellene German princes ignorant of modern-day Greek realities, to be Greek sovereigns.

During the later 19th century the new studies of archaeology and anthropology began to offer a quite separate view of ancient Greece, which had previously been experienced second-hand only through Greek literature, Greek sculpture and architecture. Twentieth-century heirs of the 19th-century view of an unchanging, immortal quality of "Greekness" are typified in J. C. Lawson's Modern Greek Folklore and Ancient Greek Religion (1910) or R. and E. Blum's The Dangerous Hour: The lore of crisis and mystery in rural Greece (1970).

According to the Classicist Paul Cartledge, they "represent this ideological construction of Greekness as an essence, a Classicizing essence to be sure, impervious to such historic changes as that from paganism to Orthodox Christianity, or from subsistence peasant agriculture to more or less internationally market-driven capitalist farming."

The Philhellenic movement led to the introduction of Classics or Classical studies as a key element in education, introduced in the Gymnasien in Prussia. In England the main proponent of Classics in schools was Thomas Arnold, headmaster at Rugby School.

Nikos Dimou's The Misfortune to be Greek argues that the Philhellenes' expectation for the modern Greek people to live up to their ancestors' allegedly glorious past has always been a burden upon the Greeks themselves. In particular, Western Philhellenism focused exclusively on the heritage of Classical Greece, while negating or rejecting the heritage of the Byzantine Empire and the Greek Orthodox Church, which for the Greek people are at least as important.

=== Art ===
Philhellenism also created a renewed interest in the artistic movement of Neoclassicism, which idealized fifth-century Classical Greek art and architecture, very much at second hand, through the writings of the first generation of art historians, like Johann Joachim Winckelmann and Gotthold Ephraim Lessing.

The groundswell of the Philhellenic movement was result of two generations of intrepid artists and amateur treasure-seekers, from Stuart and Revett, who published their measured drawings as The Antiquities of Athens and culminating with the removal of sculptures from Aegina and the Parthenon (the Elgin Marbles), works that inspired the British Philhellenes, many of whom, however, deplored their removal.

=== Greek War of Independence and later ===
Many well-known philhellenes supported the Greek Independence Movement such as Shelley, Thomas Moore, Leigh Hunt, Cam Hobhouse, Walter Savage Landor and Jeremy Bentham.

Some, notably Lord Byron, even took up arms to join the Greek revolutionaries. Many more financed the revolution or contributed through their artistic work.

Throughout the 19th century, philhellenes continued to support Greece politically and militarily. For example, Ricciotti Garibaldi led a volunteer expedition (Garibaldini) in the Greco-Turkish War of 1897. A group of Garibaldini, headed by the Greek poet Lorentzos Mavilis, fought also with the Greek side during the Balkan Wars.

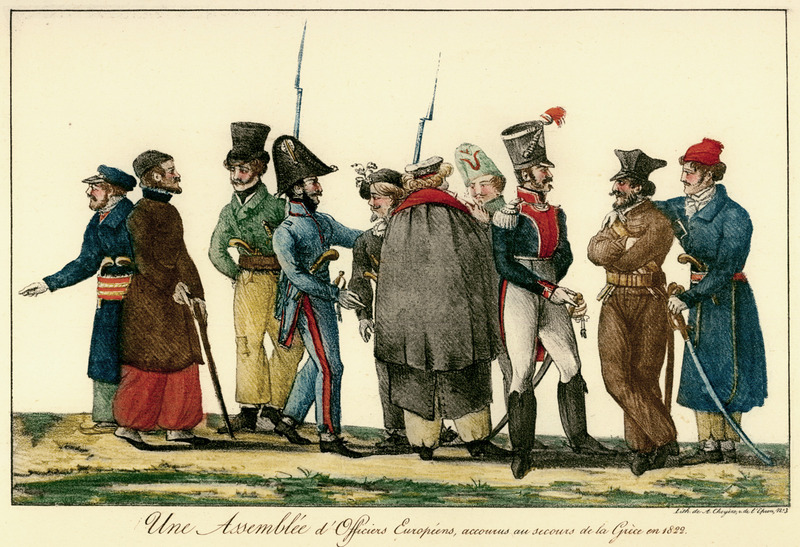
Depiction of Philhellenes in Greece in 1822

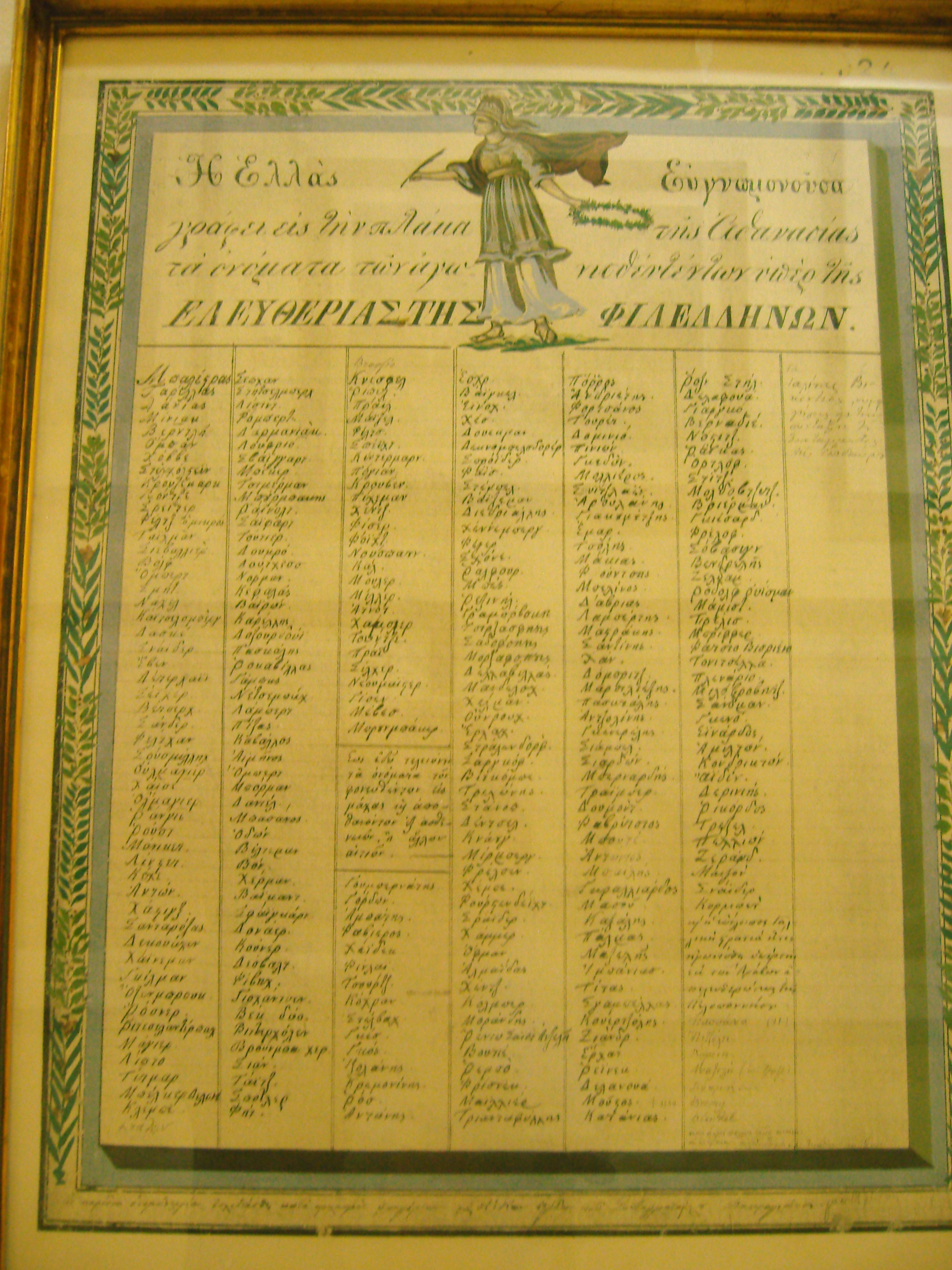
List of philhellenes who contributed during the Greek War of Independence (National Historical Museum). The first two columns from the left are the names of those having died.

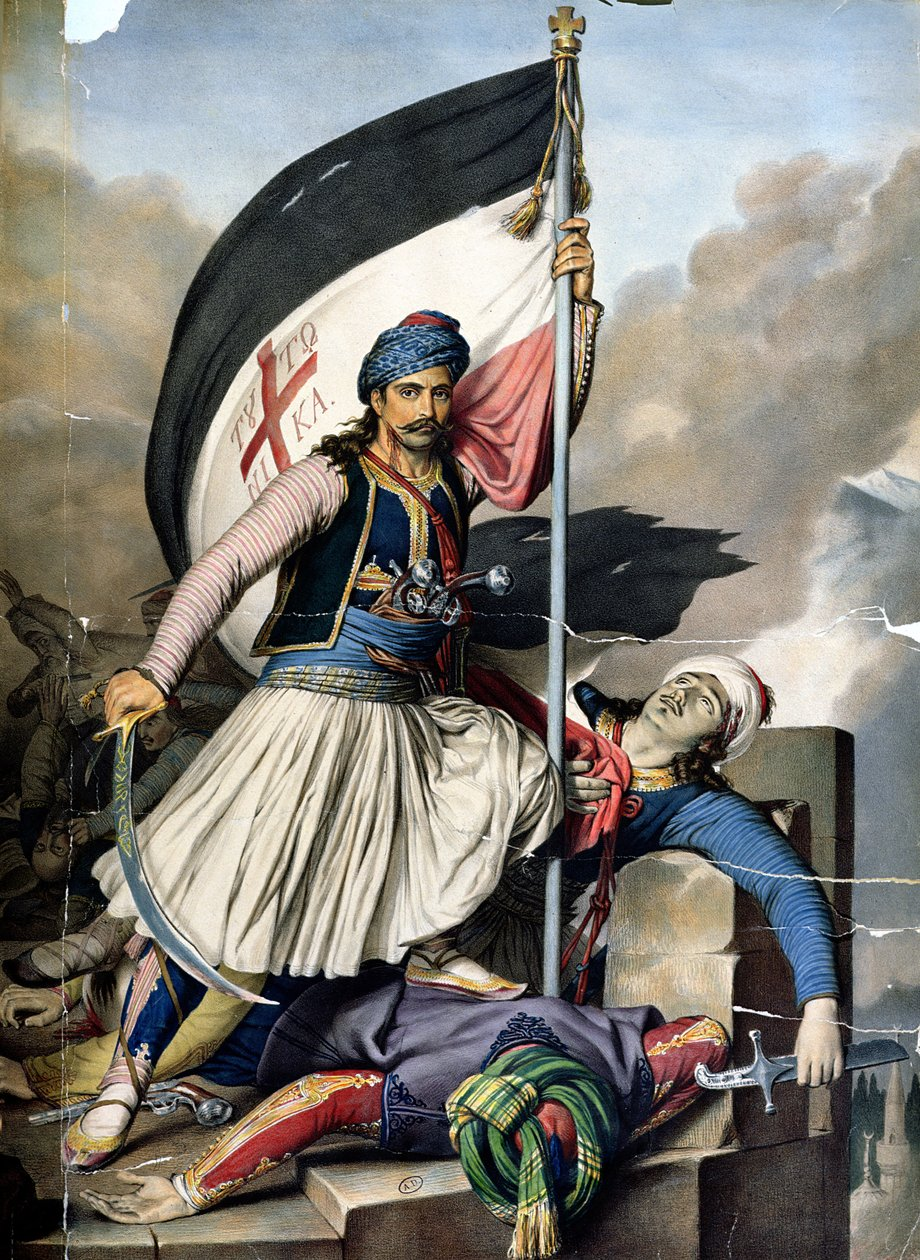
Louis Dupré's depiction of Greek irregulars hoisting the flag at Salona

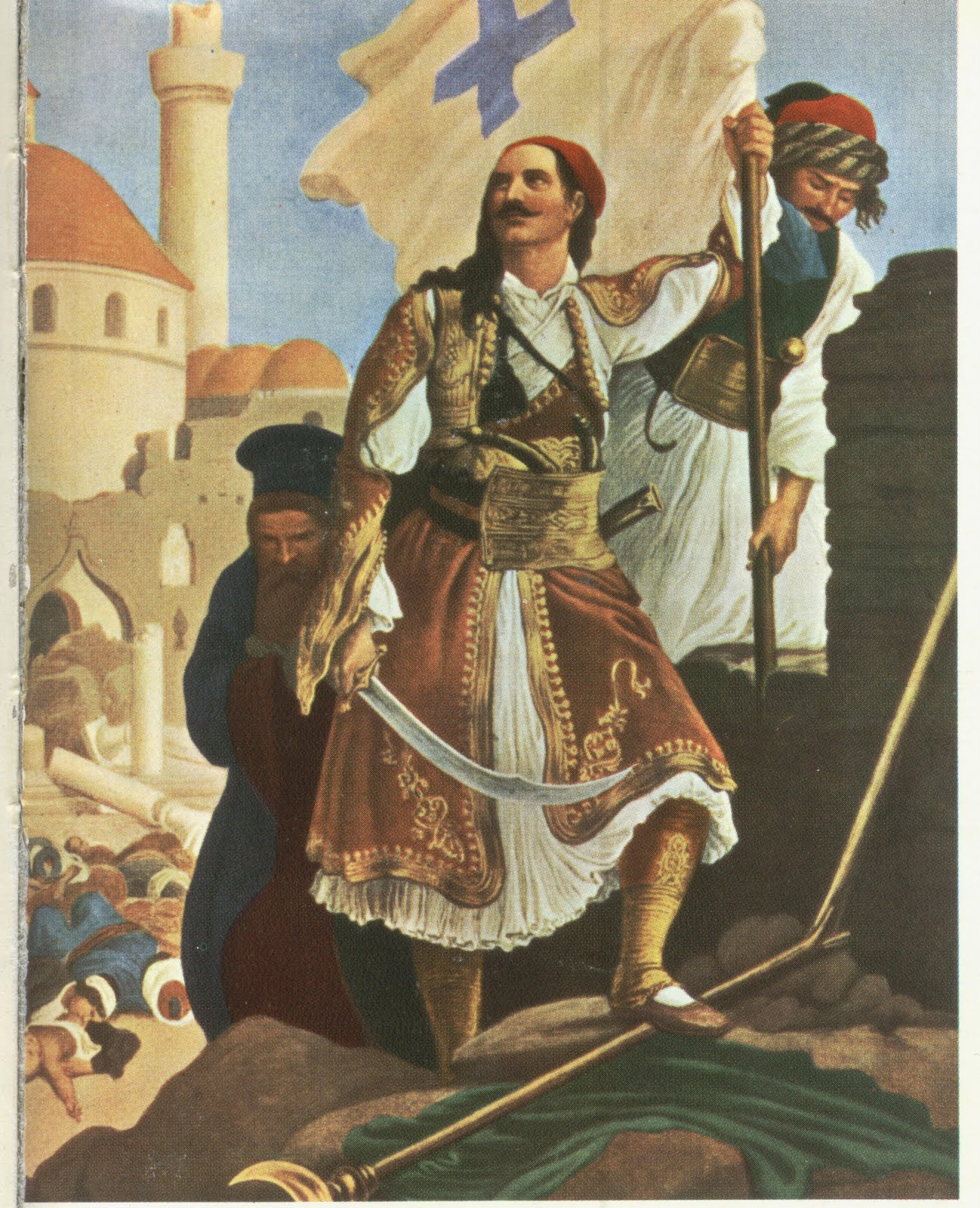
Panagiotis Kephalas plants the flag of liberty upon the walls of Tripolizza (Siege of Tripolitsa)" by Peter von Hess

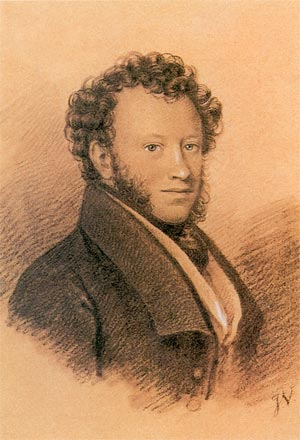
Alexander Pushkin

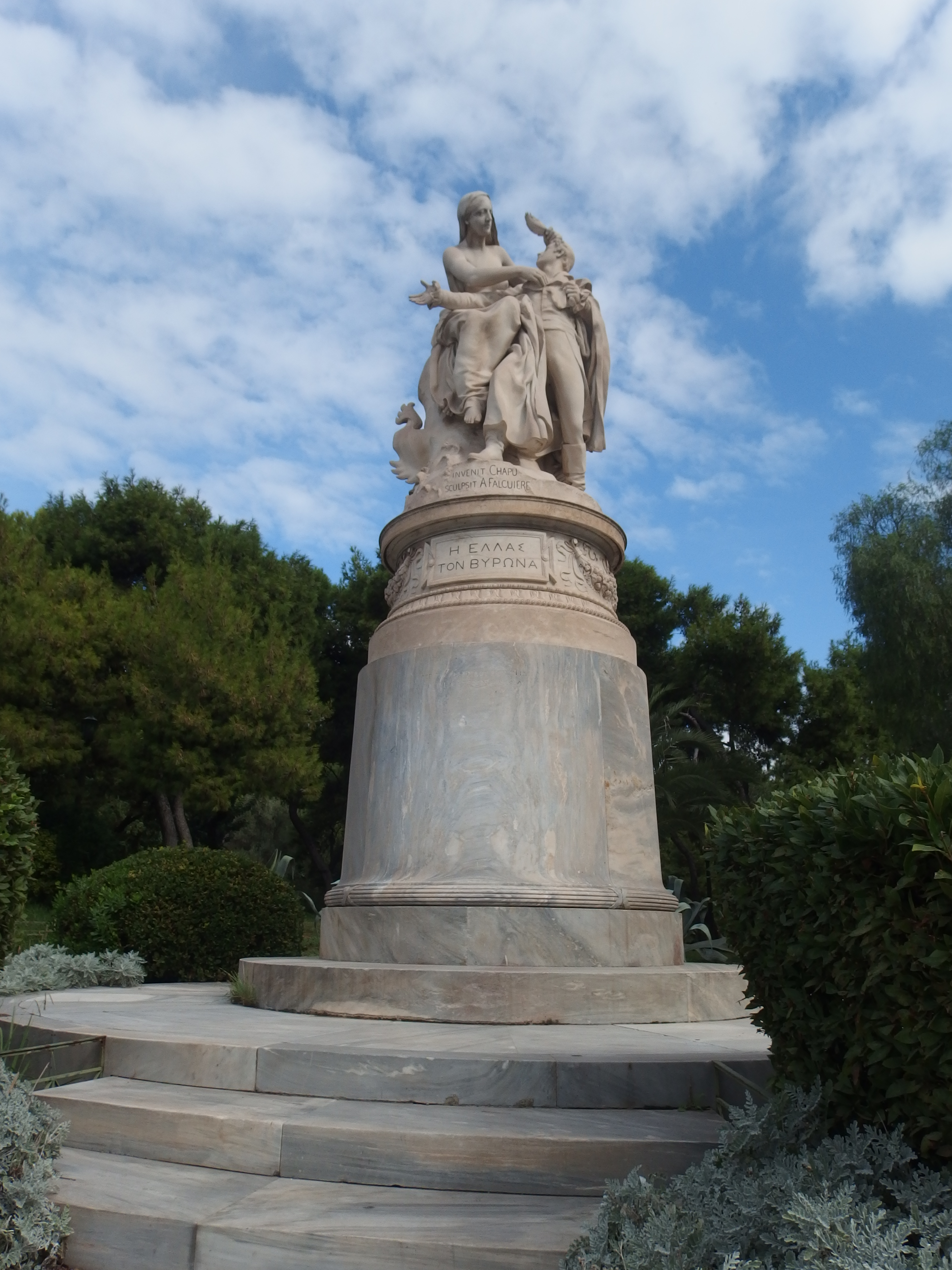
A statue of Lord Byron in Athens

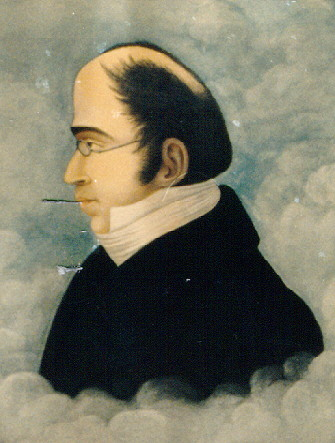
Annibale Santorre di Rossi de Pomarolo, Count of Santarosa

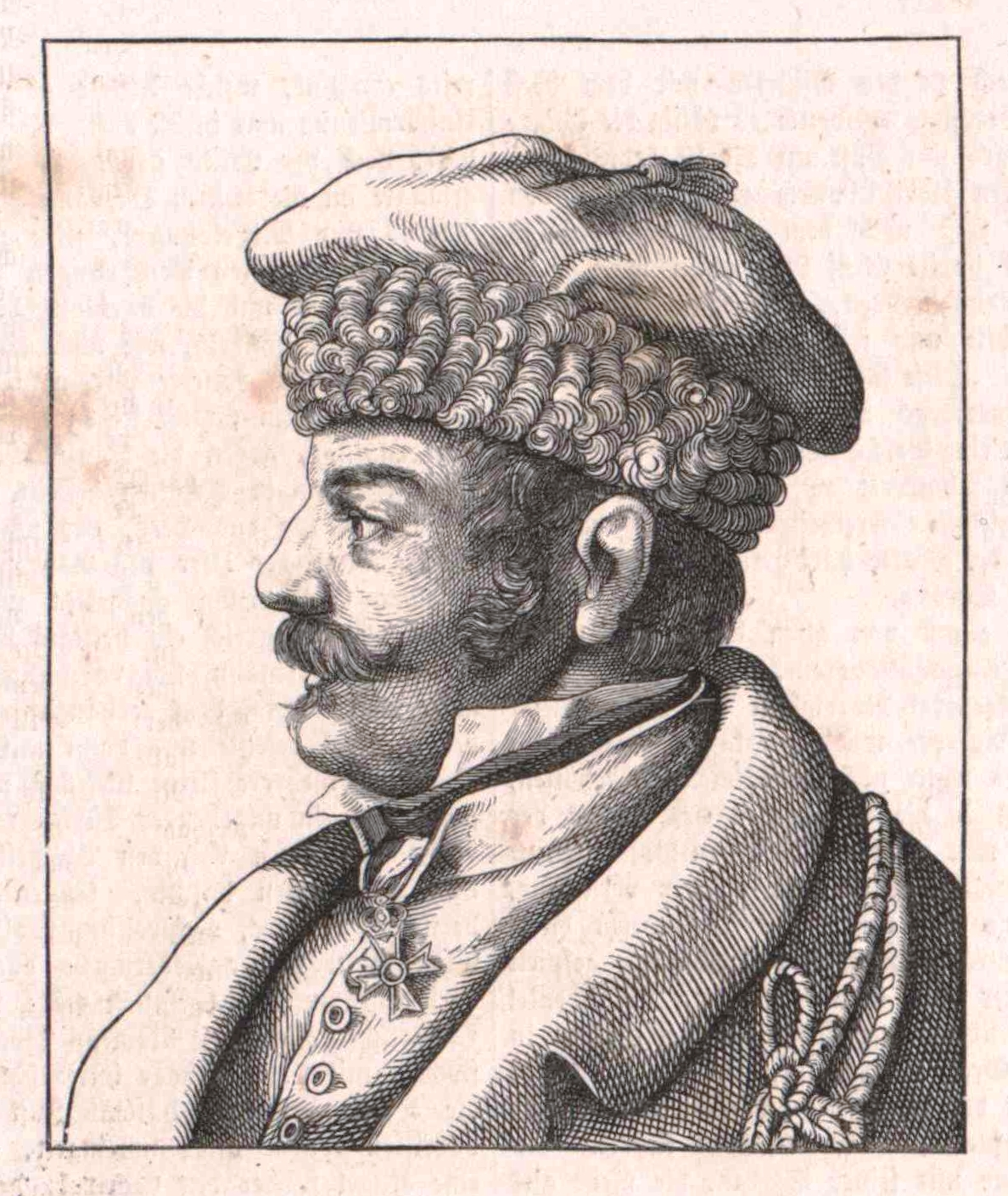
Karl von Normann-Ehrenfels

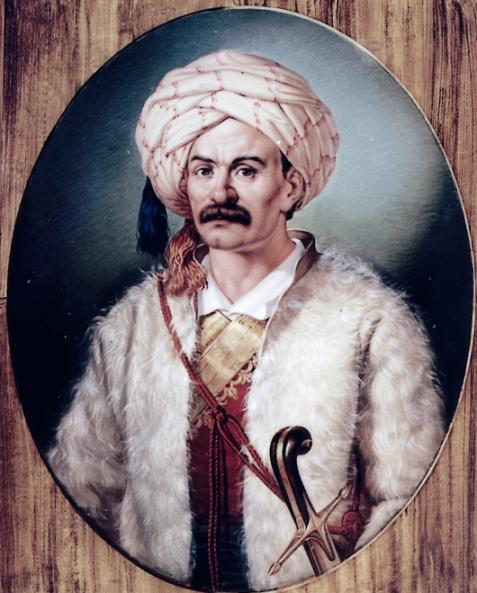
Charles Nicolas Fabvier

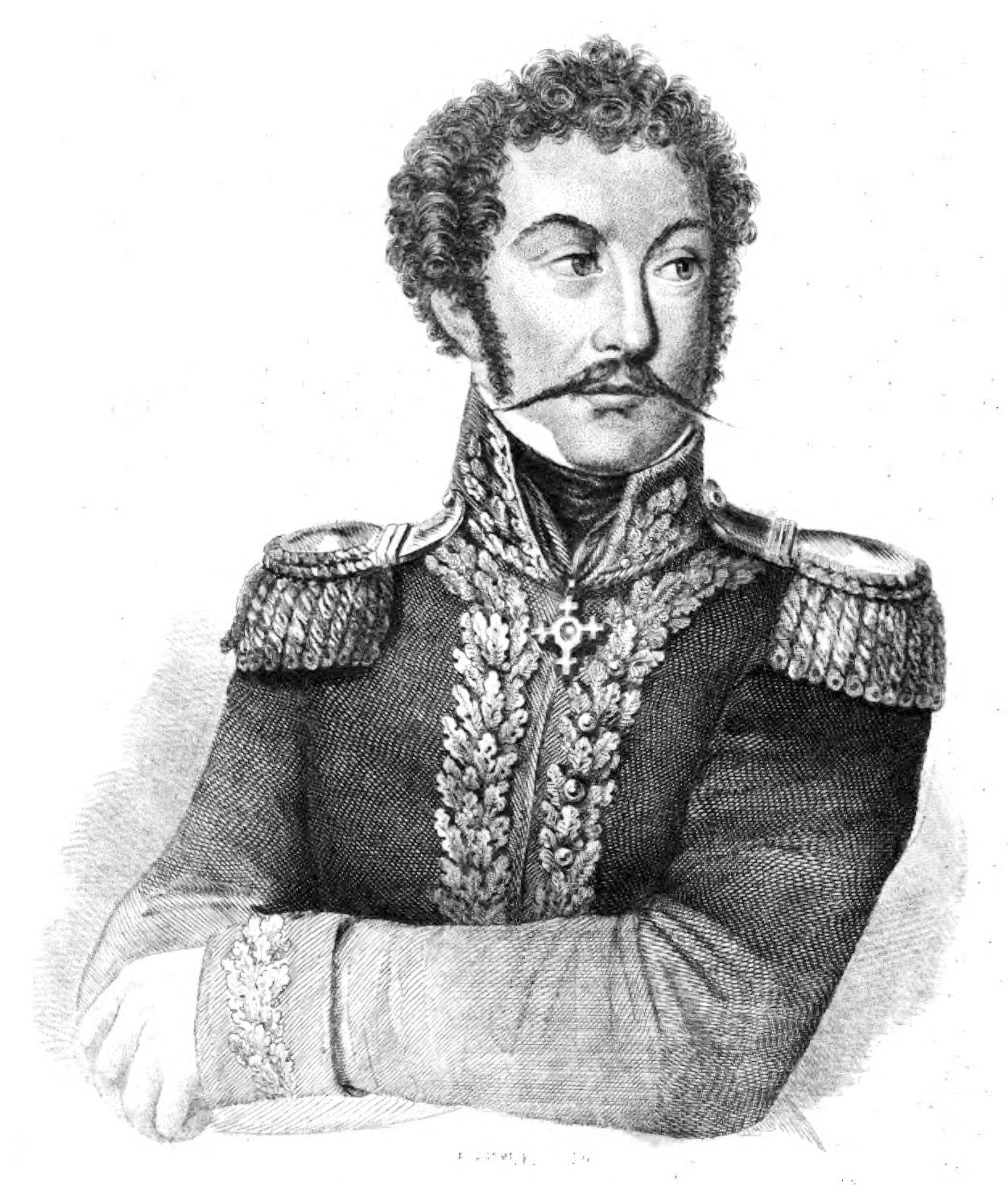
Giuseppe Rosaroll

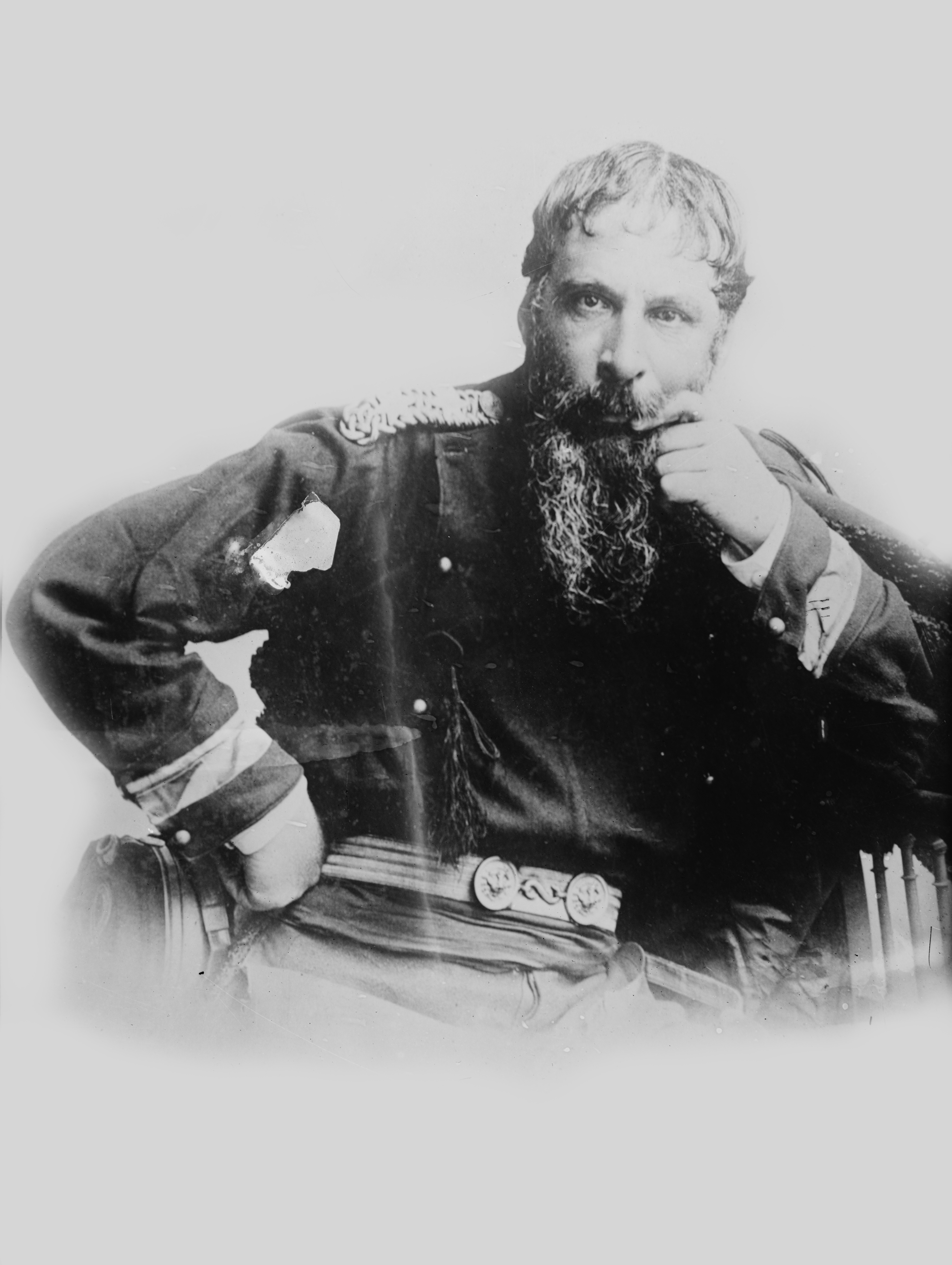
Ricciotti Garibaldi

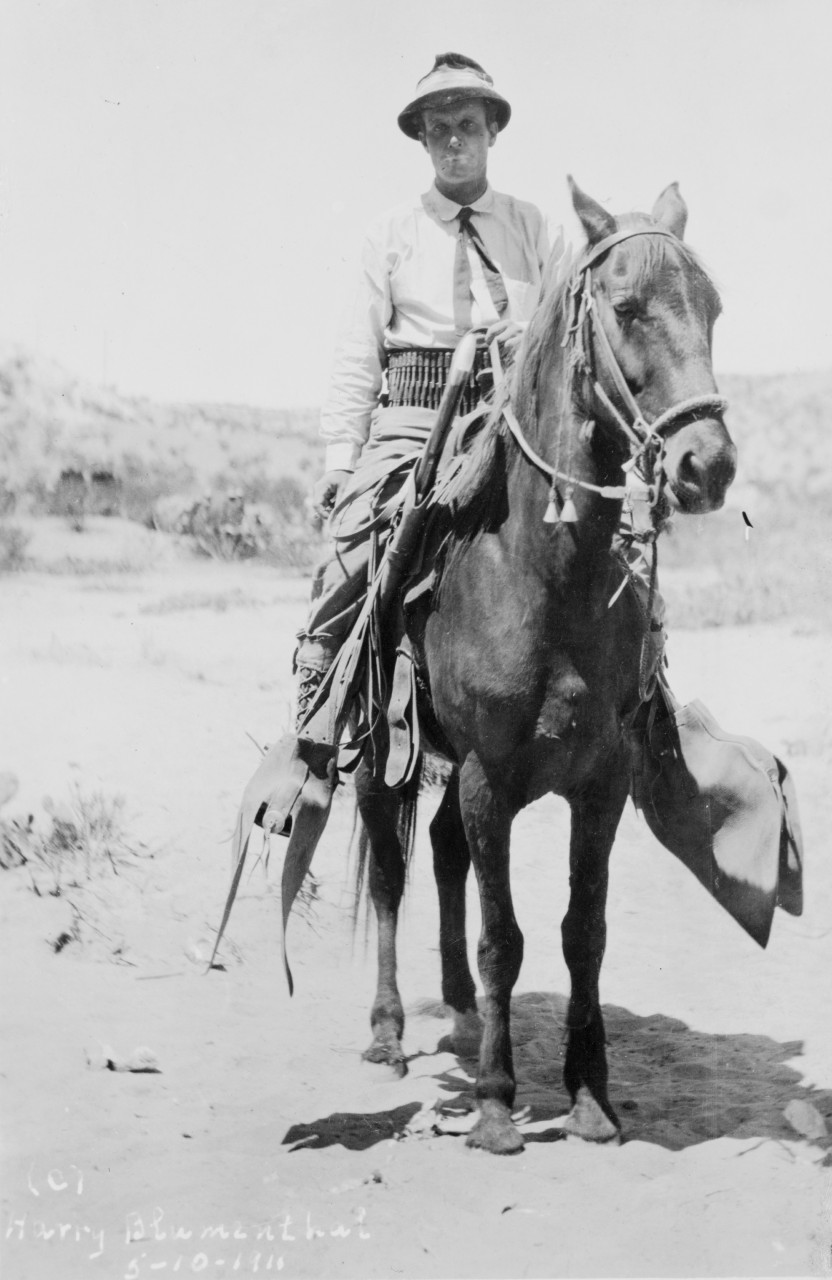
Giuseppe Garibaldi II

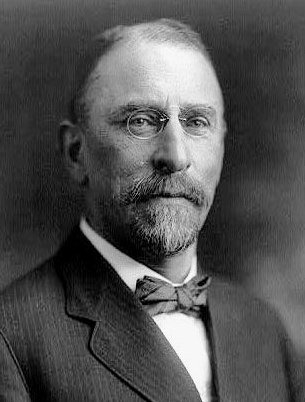
Henry Morgenthau Sr.

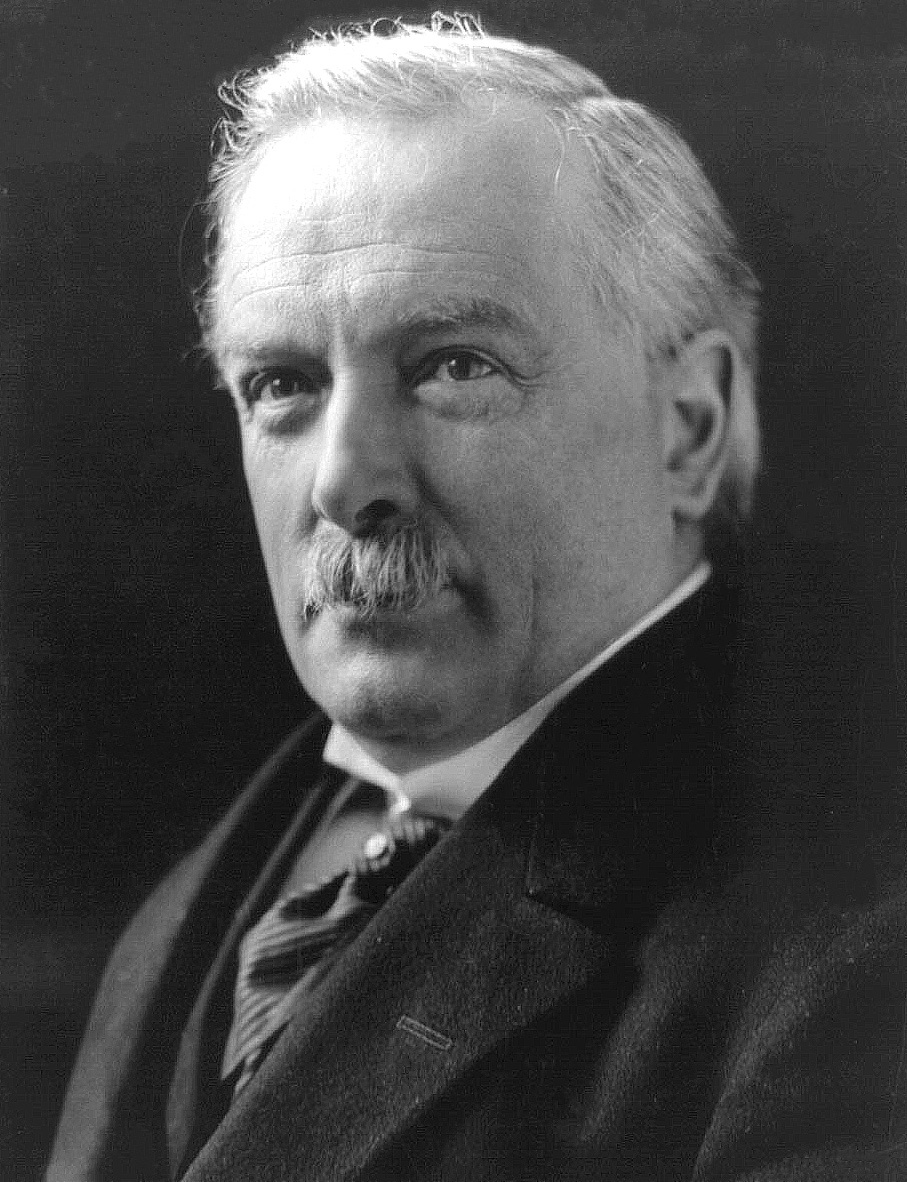
David Lloyd George

=== Notable 20th- and 21st-century philhellenes ===
- Ali Sami Bey (c. 1872 – c. after 1938), former Ottoman naval officer, photographer and journalist who fought for Greece during the Greco-Turkish War (1919–1922)
- Albert Einstein, a German-born theoretical physicist widely acknowledged to be one of the greatest physicists of all time
- Stephen Fry, English actor and writer
- Giuseppe Garibaldi II, Italian soldier and revolutionary, grandson of Giuseppe Garibaldi and son of Ricciotti Garibaldi
- Ricciotti Garibaldi, Italian soldier, son of Giuseppe Garibaldi
- David Lloyd George, Prime Minister of the United Kingdom
- Matthias Laurenz Gräff, Austrian-Greek painter, historian and politician (representative of the Austrian governing party NEOS for Greece and whole Cyprus)
- Boris Johnson, former Prime Minister of the United Kingdom
- Dilys Powell, film critic, author of several books about Greece, and president of the Classical Association 1966–1967
- Gough Whitlam, 21st Prime Minister of Australia
- Christopher Hitchens, British-American author and journalist
- Juan Nicasio Gallego, Spanish poet who wrote extensive works framing the Greek War of Independence as a Holy War for European liberty.
- José de Espronceda, Romantic Spanish poet, one of the most representative authors of the 19th century.

== See also ==
- Laconophilia
