= Dukas =

The name Dukas or Doukas may refer to:

- Doukas, Byzantine Greek noble clan
- Doukas, Elis, Greece
- Ektor Doukas (1885–1969), Greek painter
- Paul Dukas (1865–1935), French composer
- Doukas (historian) (c. 1400 – after 1462), Greek historian
- Vera Ducas executed by Irgun 1948
