= The Reception of Lord Byron at Missolonghi =

Painting by Theodoros Vryzakis

- Η υποδοχή του Λόρδου Βύρωνα στο Μεσολόγγι (Greek)
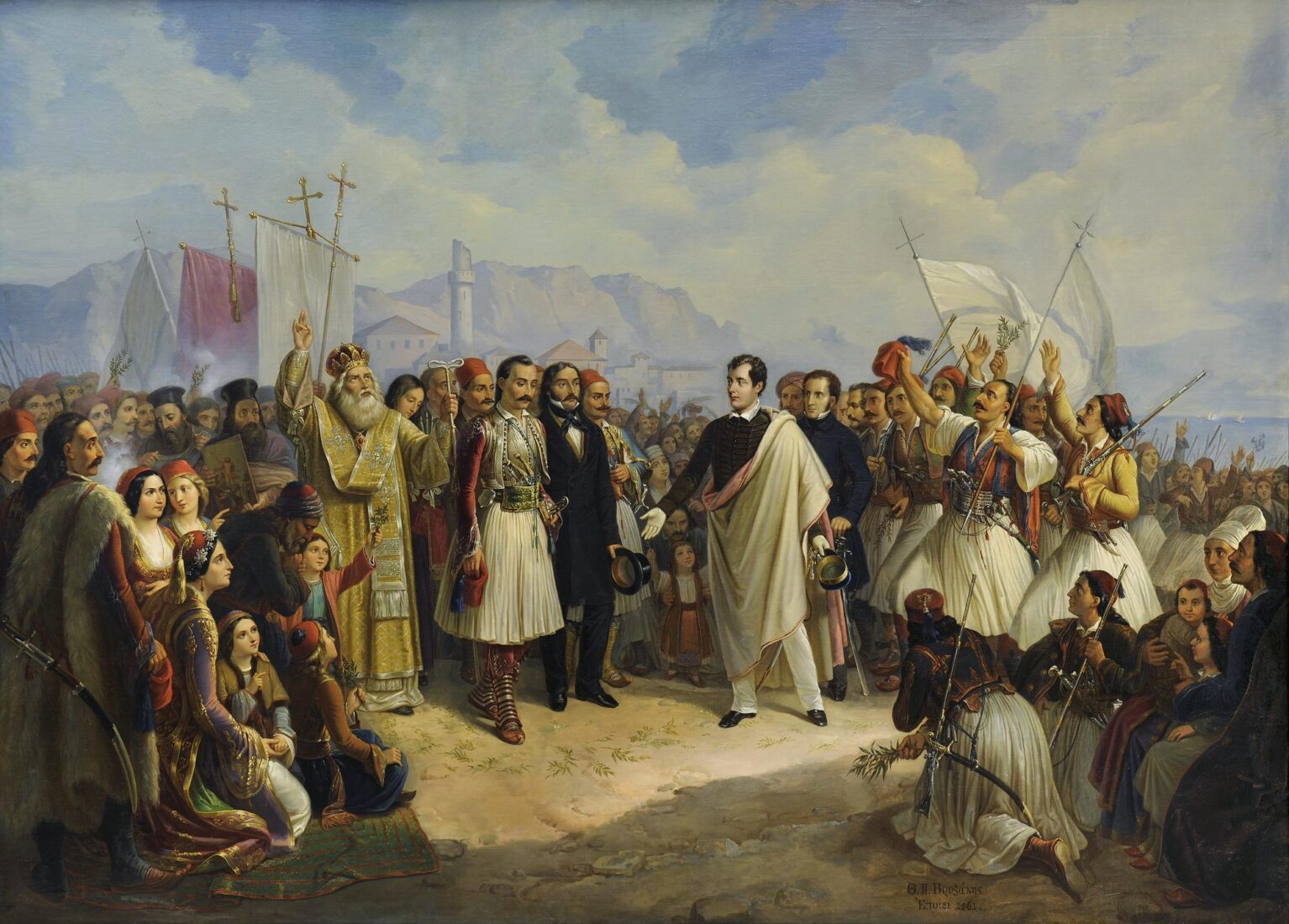
- Artist: Theodoros Vryzakis
- Year: 1861
- Medium: oil on canvas
- Dimensions: 155 cm × 213 cm (61 in × 84 in)
- Location: National Gallery, Athens

The Lord Byron reception at Missolonghi is an oil painting created by Theodoros Vryzakis in 1861. It is exhibited at the National Gallery, Athens.

== Description ==
It depicts the arrival of the English philhellene Lord Byron at Missolonghi and his welcome. He appears to be coming from the port, accompanied by his friend Edward John Trelawny and numerous soldiers who are cheering. The local authorities and Alexandros Mavrokordatos, who had invited him, welcome him.

== Analysis ==
Art historians point to the stiff, lifeless and rigid forms of the figures. Specifically, Stelios Lydakis calls them: "dummies like steel". There are also borrowings from other models, such as the bishop, whose form is a variation of the Germanos III of Old Patras of Peter von Hess. The naive dimension and the folklore of the style and the patterns in this table, also point out the critics: abuse of dress and oplografikis storytelling, theatrical gestures and pompous attitudes. With overt symbolism, the priest behind the bishop keeps a picture of the resurrection of Christ was a symbol of the resurrection of Greece, and in the distance a ruined minaret seems to be showing the expulsion of the Turks. As for Lord Byron is illustrated by way of messiah. It is basically another fable its composition dictated by philhellenic demand issues from the national liberation struggle of the Greeks, to massive acclaim.

== Sources ==
- Απόστολος Βακαλόπουλος, «Θεόδωρος Βρυζάκης, ο ζωγράφος της Επαναστάσεως», στο: Οι Έλληνες ζωγράφοι, vol. 1. Από τον 19ο αιώνα στον 20ό, εκδ. Μέλισσα, Αθήνα, 1975, p. 68
- Στέλιος Λυδάκης,«Ο Θεόδωρος Βρυζάκης το έργο και η εποχή του» στο: Οι Έλληνες ζωγράφοι, vol. 1. Από τον 19ο αιώνα στον 20ο, εκδ. Μέλισσα, Αθήνα, 1975, p. 76
- Αντώνης Κωτίδης, Ελληνική τέχνη. Ζωγραφική του 19ου αιώνα, Εκδοτική Αθηνών, Αθήνα, 1995, p. 61, 198-199
- Στέλιος Λυδάκης, «Η ομάδα του Μονάχου-Η σχολή του Μονάχου» στο: Οι Έλληνες ζωγράφοι, vol. 3, εκδ. Μέλισσα, Αθήνα, 1976, p.130
- Δημήτρης Παυλόπουλος, «Ο Βύρων στην νεοελληνική τέχνη» στο Επτά Ημέρες της Καθημερινής, (25-26 Μαρτίου 2000), p. 24-26
