= Ioannis Doukas =

Greek painter

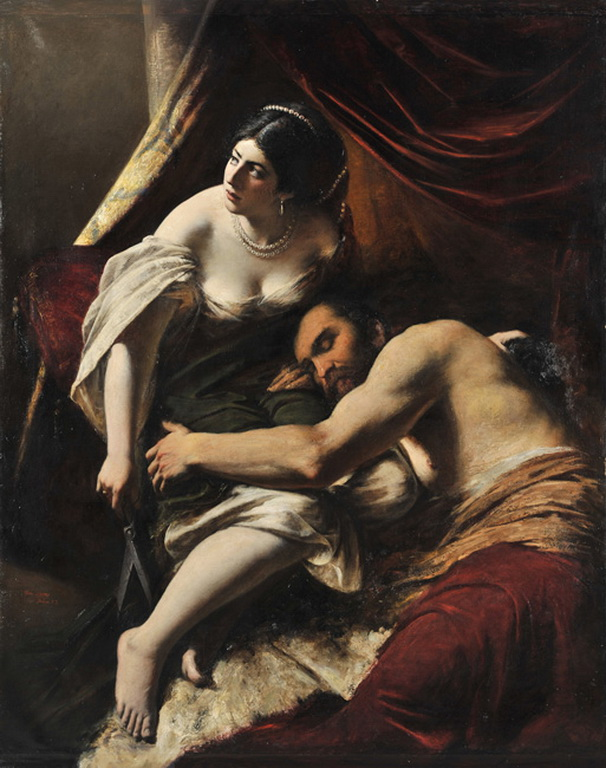
Samson and Delilah

Ioannis Doukas or Dukas (Greek: Ιωάννης Δούκας, 1841–1916) was a Greek painter and one of the main representatives in 19th century portrait painting in Greece.

== Life ==
Doukas was born in 1841, in Gjirokastër (then Ottoman Empire, modern Albania). He started his studies in art at the School of Fine Arts of Athens, Greece, in 1859. He continued his studies outside Greece: initially in the Academy of Fine Arts in Munich (1865-1868), being a student of the German painter Karl von Piloty. He then moved to Paris and became student of Jean-Léon Gérôme.

Doukas worked as painter in a number of western European cities: Paris, Marseille and Vienna, where he became distinguished in the painting of portraits. At 1879 he returned to Greece, while continued to be focused in portrait painting. Doukas attended several artist's exhibitions in Greece and abroad, such as the Paris Salon. He died in Athens in 1916.

== Work and legacy ==
His works include historical, mythological, biblical and allegorical representations, as well as the creating of copies of distinguished painters, like Peter Paul Rubens, Rembrandt and Anthony van Dyck. He painted also a religious icon of Jesus Christ, at the Greek-Orthodox Church of Saint Nicholas in Liverpool, England.

Doukas is classified as one of the main representatives of the so-called 'Greek Munich School'; a group of 19th Greek artists that studied in the Academy of Fine Arts in Munich and were influenced by the movement of academic realism.
