= Ioannis Zacharias =

Greek painter

- Ιωάννης Ζαχαρίας
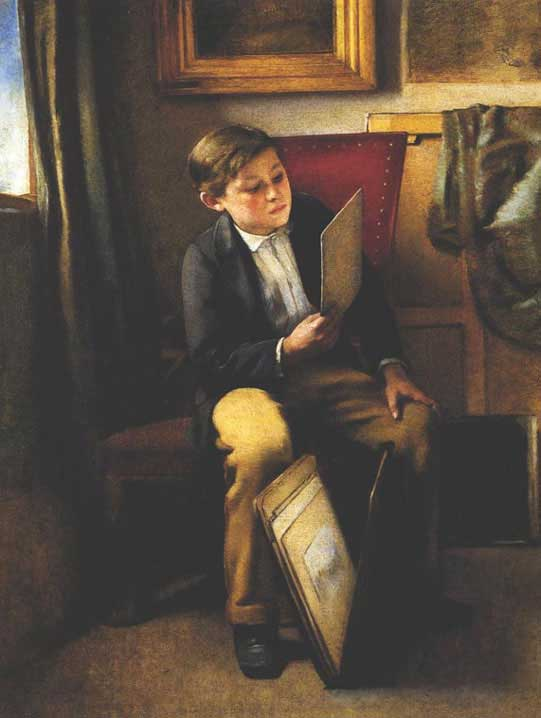
- Ioannis Zacharias, L'Étudiant, Pinacothèque Nationale, Athènes
- Born: c. 1845; Athens, Greece
- Died: c. 1873 (aged 27–28); Corfu, Greece
- Occupation: Painter

Ioannis Zacharias (Greek: Ιωάννης Ζαχαρίας, c. 1845 – c. 1873) was a Greek painter.

== Life ==
Ioannis Zacharias was born in Athens in about 1845.

He entered the Athens School of Fine Arts in 1859, and graduated in 1866. In 1867 he went on to the Academy of Fine Arts, Munich, to study under Karl von Piloty. His teacher recommended awarding him a scholarship due to his ability. He participated in the Vienna 1873 World Exposition. He became mentally ill, and was unable to continue working. He died in the mental hospital of Corfu. The exact date is unknown.

== Work ==
Zacharias produced a small number of portraits and genre scenes. They are both sensitive and technically strong.

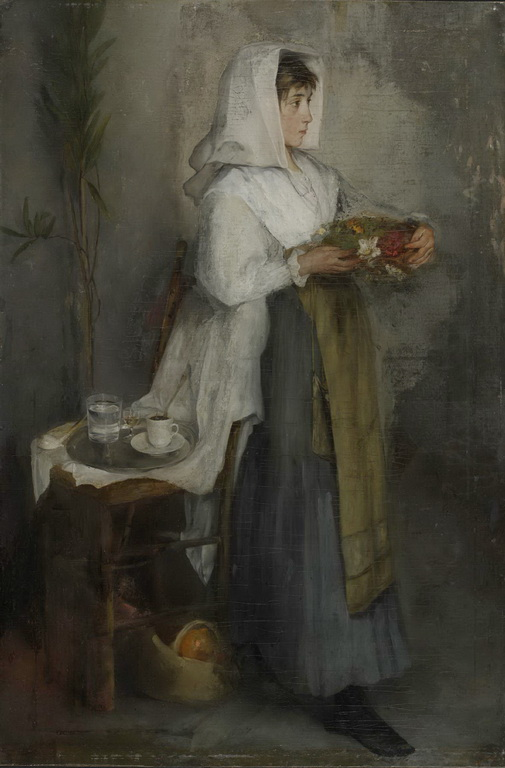
Standing girl (1866)

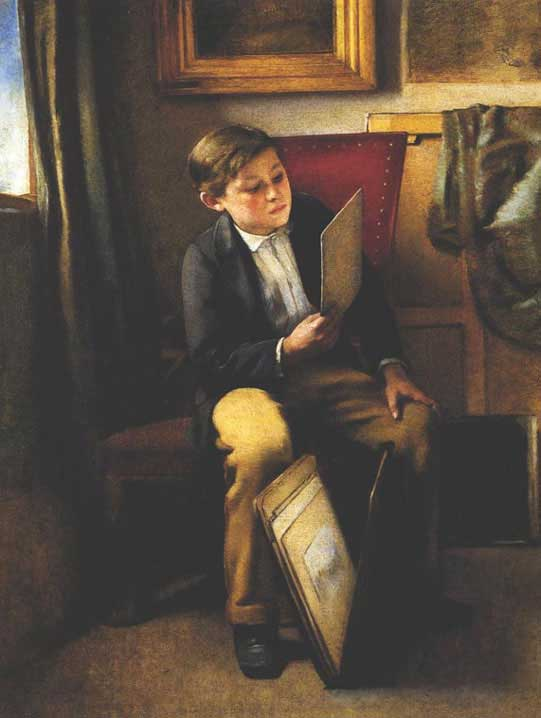
The Student

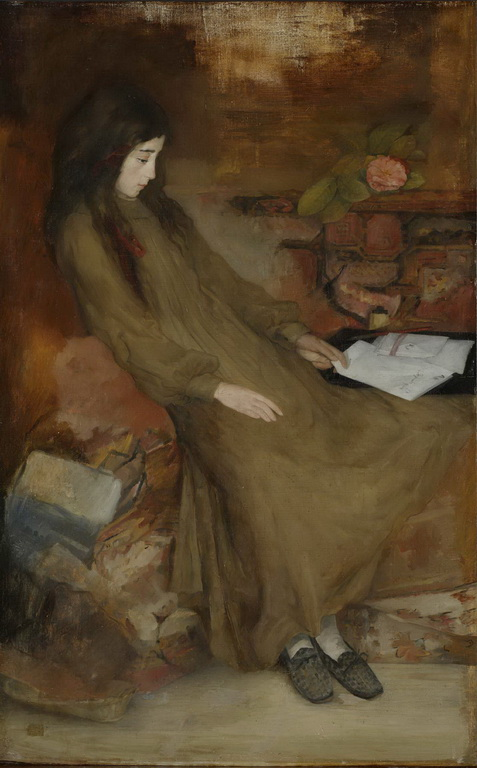
The letter (1873)

== Sources ==
- Ζαχαρίας Ιωάννης (in Greek), National Gallery of Greece, archived from the original on 2016-03-02
