= Theodoros Vryzakis =

Greek painter (1819–1878)

- Born: 19 October 1814; İstefe, Ottoman Empire (now Thebes, Greece)
- Died: 6 December 1878 (aged 59); Munich, German Empire
- Education: School of Arts, Athens; Royal Academy of Fine Arts, Munich
- Known for: Painter and faculty member
- Movement: Orientalist; Munich School; Genre art

Theodoros Vryzakis (Greek: Θεόδωρος Βρυζάκης; 1814–1878) was a Greek painter, known mostly for his historical scenes. He was one of the founders of the "Munich School", composed of Greek artists who had studied in that city.

== Biography ==
He grew up during the years of the Greek War of Independence. His father was hanged by the Ottoman Army near the very beginning of the war, in 1821, and he had to flee with his mother into the mountains.

By 1832, he was in an orphanage, where his artistic talent was discovered by Friedrich Thiersch, a scholar who had played a significant role in making a Bavarian prince (Otto) the new King of Greece. Thiersch took him to Munich, where he attended the "Panhellenion", a school for orphans of the Greek revolution, founded by King Ludwig I. After completing his studies, he returned to Greece and enrolled at the Athens School of Fine Arts.

In 1844, he returned to Munich on a scholarship and was admitted to the Academy of Fine Arts. His teachers there included Carl Wilhelm von Heideck and Peter von Hess, both known for their support of Greek independence. After graduation, he spent ten years travelling throughout Europe, including a two-year stay in Greece from 1848 to 1850. At the end of his travels, he exhibited some of his works relating to the Sieges of Messolonghi at the Exposition Universelle. Most of these canvases were destroyed by a fire in 1929.

From 1861 to 1863, he worked in Manchester, England, painting murals at the Greek Orthodox Church of the Annunciation, Manchester. Four years later, he took part in a major exhibition at the Galerie Del Vecchio in Leipzig. He painted little during the last decade of his life, due to an eye ailment. His death was due to heart disease. In his will, he left all of the works in his studio to the University of Athens and 760 Marks to repair the roof of the Salvatorkirche in Munich. Many of his paintings were widely distributed in the form of lithographs.

== Selected paintings from the National Gallery (Athens) ==
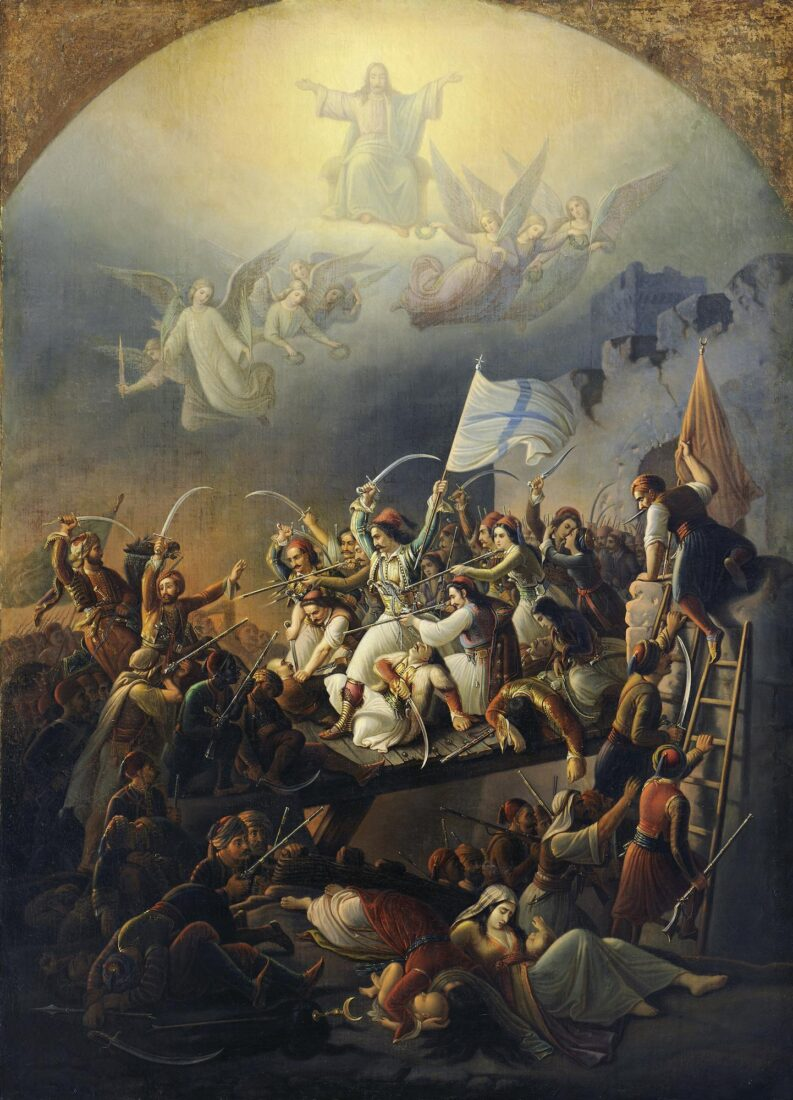
The Sortie of Messolonghi (1853)

The Camp of Georgios Karaiskakis (1855)

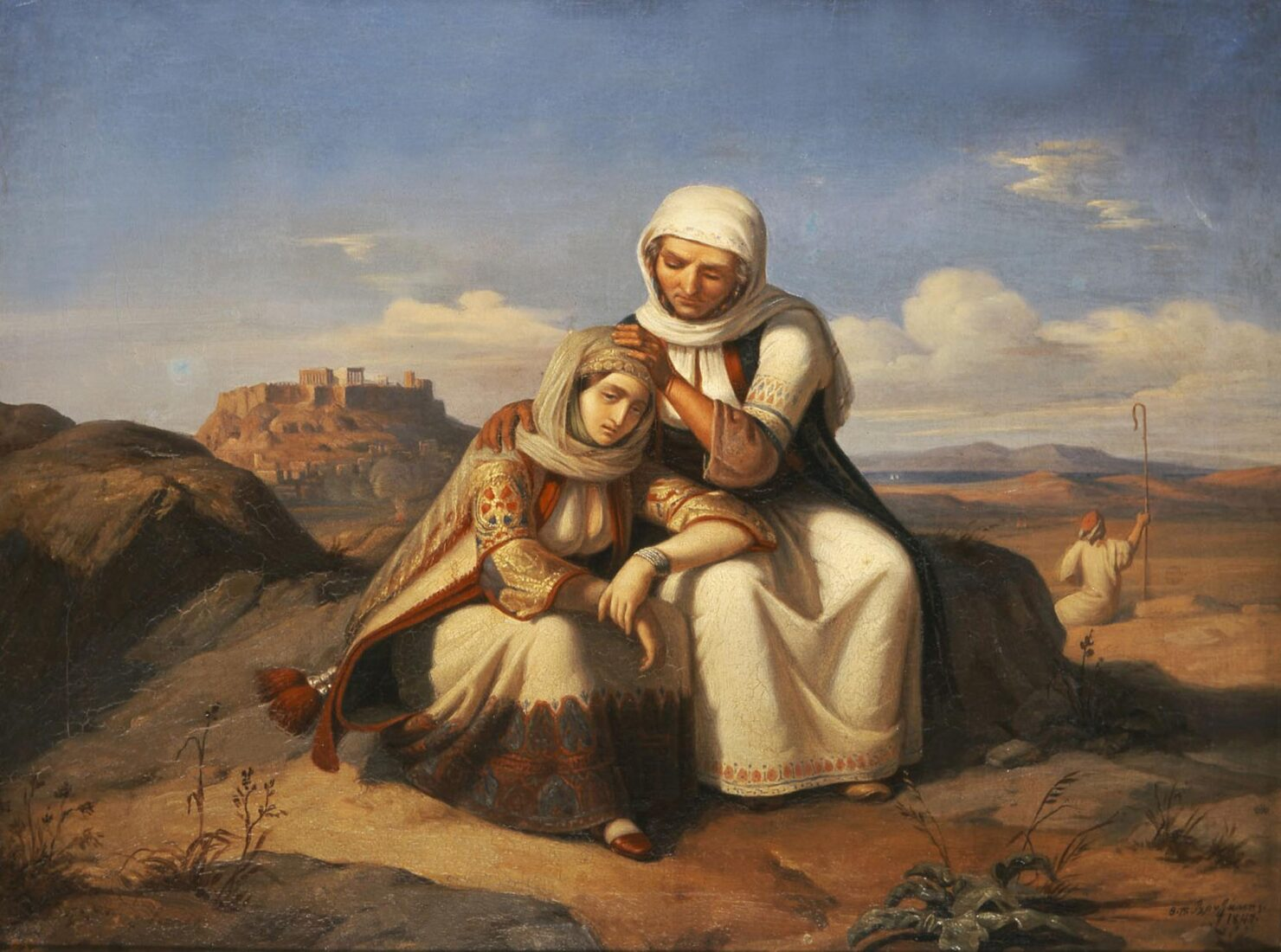
The Consolation (1856)

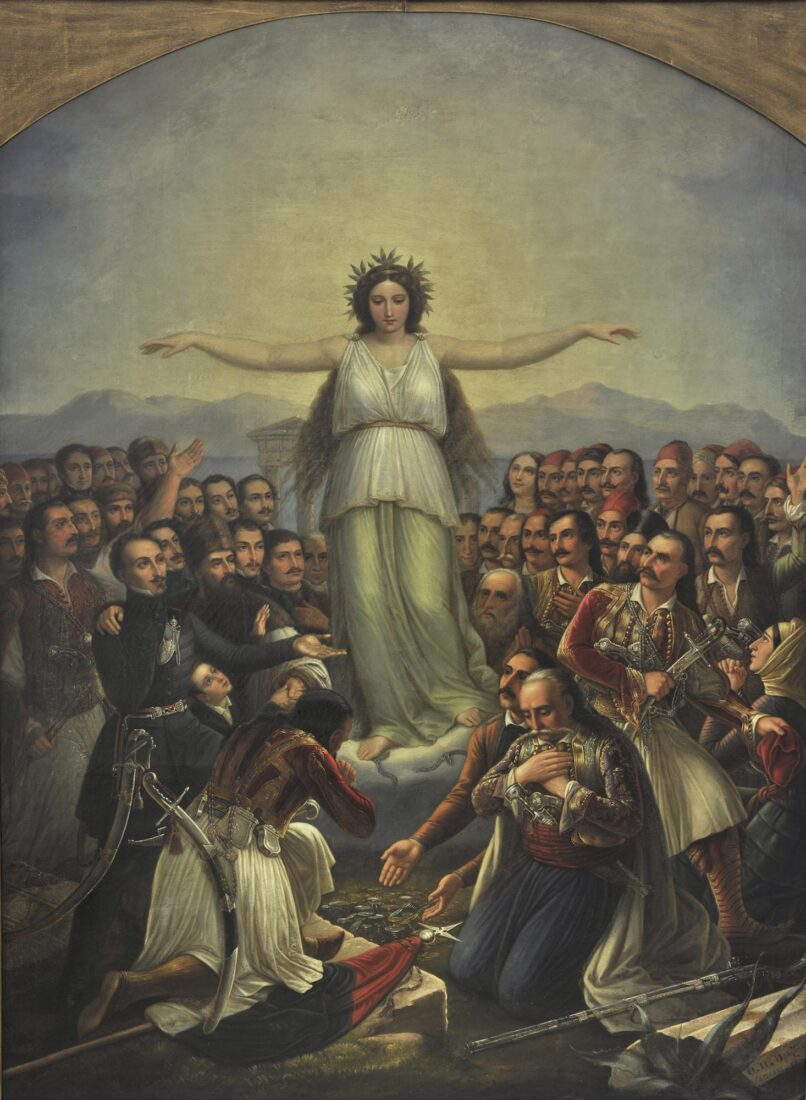
Grateful Hellas (1858)

The Reception of Lord Byron at Missolonghi (1861)

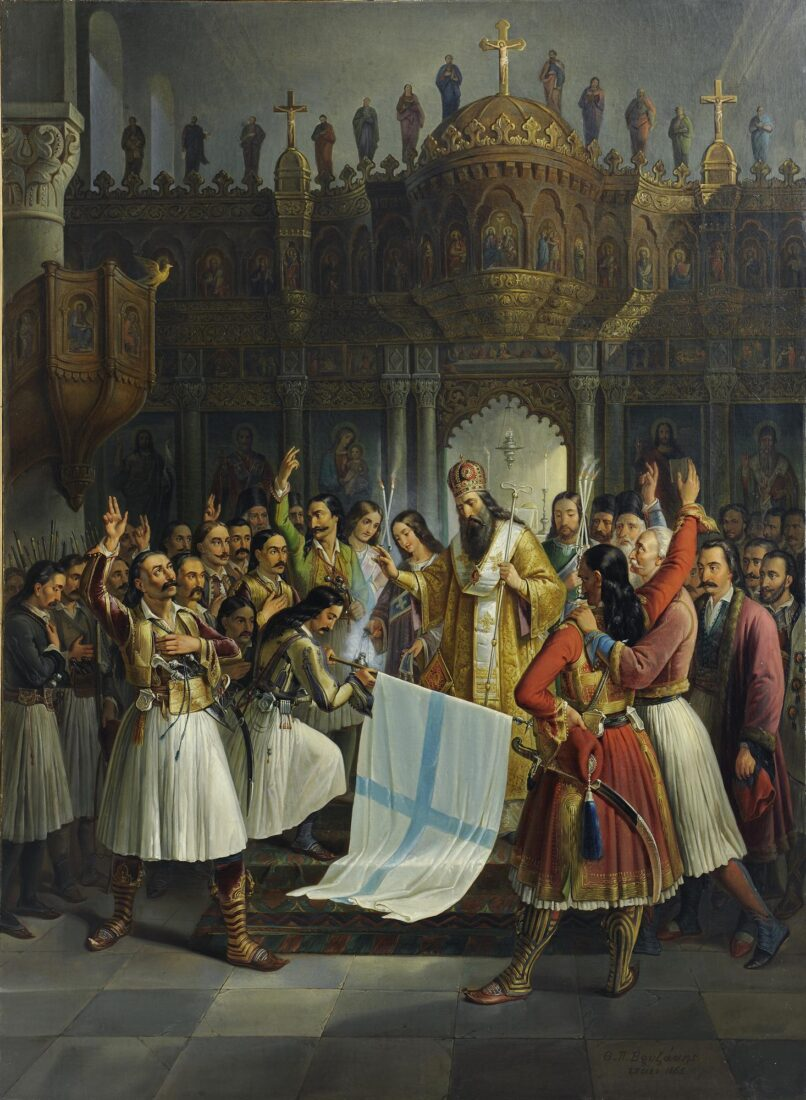
The Bishop of Old Patras Germanos Blesses the Flag of Revolution (1865)
