= Ektor Doukas =

Greek painter

- Έκτωρ Δούκας
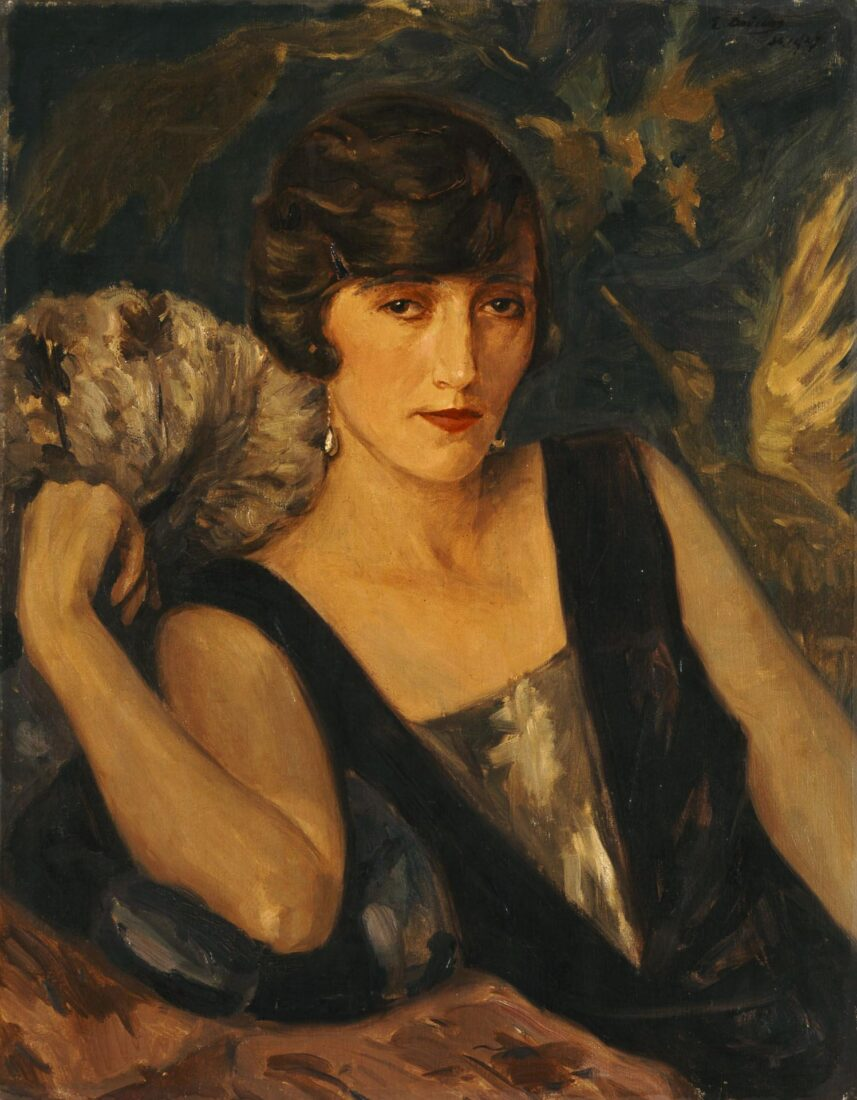
- Portrait of Amalia Lili Arlioti 1927
- Born: 1885; Smyrna, Asia Minor
- Died: 1969 (aged 83–84); Athens, Greece
- Occupation: Painter

Ektor Doukas (or Hector Doukas, Greek: Έκτωρ Δούκας, 1885–1969) was a Greek painter, a member of the Munich School, whose style combined academic elements with impressionism and expressionism.

== Life ==
Ektor Doukas was born in Smyrna in 1885. He went to Munich in 1907 and studied painting at the Munich Academy under Ludwig von Löfftz. In 1913 he was awarded an honorary distinction. He then moved to Paris, where he studied at the Académie Julian. He also studied in Venice. At the age of 32 he moved to Munich. He eventually returned to Greece, and died in Athens in 1969.

== Work ==
He began to exhibit in Greece while still a student in Munich. As well as solo exhibitions he exhibited at the Venice Biennale in 1934 and the Panhellenic Exhibitions in 1948, 1952, 1963 and 1967. His Portrait of Amalia (Lily) Arlioti (1927) is held by the National Gallery of Greece. His well-known painting of women carrying ammunition in Pindos during the War of 1940 is held by the National Historical Museum, Athens.

Doukas's style was distinctive, combining academic elements with impressionism and expressionism. His works depicted Greek pastoral realism and genre scenes. His work included portraits, still lifes, landscapes and seascapes. He said that he avoided anything that resembled a cut-and-paste from nature, but wanted his work to be understandable without any explanation, or even any title. He won particular attention for his portraits of the Duchess of Mecklenburg and Princess Amélie Louise of Arenberg.

== Sources ==
- "Δούκας Εκτωρ", National Gallery (in Greek), archived from the original on 2014-05-19
- "Doukas Ektor", Nikias, archived from the original on 2016-03-04
- "Έλληνες Ζωγράφοι: Έκτωρ Δούκας", Artemnotes (in Greek)
- Maris Lefakis, "Doukas Hector", Lefakis Galleries, archived from the original on 2016-03-05
- ""Τοπίο" του Έκτορα Δούκα", Arteshop.gr (in Greek), archived from the original on 2016-03-04
