= Ioannis Koutsis =

Greek painter

- Born: 1860; Spetses, Greece
- Died: 1953; Piraeus, Greece
- Occupation: Painter

Ioannis Koutsis (Greek: Ιωάννης Κούτσης; 1860−1953) was a Greek painter who was a member of the Munich School Greek art movement of the 19th century.

== Biography ==
He descended from an aristocratic maritime family known from the Greek Revolutionary War. At fifteen, he started together with his brothers of the management of the shipowning company. When he was a young artist he was taught by Konstantinos Volanakis, as well by the famous painter Ioannis Altamura, who also lived in their home place Spetses Island, Greece for 2 years (in the 70s)

He made no personal exhibitions but participated in many group exhibitions. He established a reputation as an artist in Piraeus. Being rather wealthy, he refrained from selling his paintings, with a possible exception during the German occupation of Greece (1941–44). As a result, his works are shared by relatives, descendants and close friends. His most important work is considered the sea battle of Armata that took part in 1822 at a location near the Island of Spetses. The work is exhibited at the small family church overlooking the Old harbour in Spetses.

His work consists of seascape paintings influenced by his teacher. It is said that in some works of Konstantinos Volanakis, Koutsis participated in completing the waves, and the sea generally, which was one of his strong points. He died in Piraeus.
