= Remarks on Nominalization =

1970 linguistics paper by Noam Chomsky

"Remarks on Nominalization" is a seminal linguistic paper on English nominalization by Noam Chomsky published in 1970. X-bar theory was first proposed in this paper. In 2020, a retrospective volume edited by Artemis Alexiadou and Hagit Borer was published by Oxford University Press, with papers focusing on the effects of Remarks on theoretical morphology, argument structure, the typology of derived nominals, and morphological complexity. The volume includes a paper by Chomsky on the background and motivation of Remarks.
