= Theodora Bynon =

British linguist (born 1936)

- Born: 1936 (age 88–89)
- Spouse: James Bynon
- Scientific career
- Doctoral students: Andrew Carstairs-McCarthy

Theodora Bynon (born 1936) is a British linguist and Emeritus Professor of Historical Linguistics at SOAS University of London. She was a student of the German linguist Hans Krahe and studied the ergative case in languages such as Kurdish. She is known for her works on historical linguistics and wrote what is considered a seminal text in 1977.

== Books ==
- Historical Linguistics, Cambridge University Press, 1977
- James and Theodora Bynon (eds.), Hamito-Semitica, London 1975
- Masayoshi Shibatani & Theodora Bynon, Approaches to language typology, Clarendon Press, 1995.
