= Elena Anagnostopoulou =

Greek theoretical linguist and syntactician

- Born: 27 January 1967 (age 59); Athens, Greece

Academic background
- Education: University of Salzburg (PhD)

Academic work
- Discipline: Linguist
- Institutions: University of Crete

Elena Anagnostopoulou (born 27 January 1967 in Athens, Greece) is a Greek theoretical linguist and syntactician. She is currently Professor of Theoretical Linguistics at the University of Crete.

== Education and career ==
Anagnostopoulou received her PhD in 1994 from the University of Salzburg. Following this, she held a postdoctoral position at the MIT from 1997 to 1998, before taking up a position as assistant professor at the University of Crete in 1998, where she remains to this day. She was promoted to Associate Professor in 2005 and to full professor in 2009. In 2007 she returned to MIT as a visiting associate professor.

Anagnostopoulou works within the framework of generative grammar, and is known for her work in syntax, morphology, and historical linguistics. Within these fields she has focused on the phenomena of case, agreement, person, argument structure, and clitics.

== Honours and awards ==
Anagnostopoulou was awarded a Friedrich Wilhelm Bessel Research Award by the Alexander von Humboldt Foundation in 2013. In 2019 she was elected a member of the Academia Europaea.

== Selected works ==
- Alexiadou, Artemis & Elena Anagnostopoulou: 'Parameterizing AGR: Word order, V-movement and EPP-checking.' Natural Language & Linguistic Theory 16 (1998), 491–539.
- Iatridou, Sabine, Elena Anagnostopoulou & Roumyana Izvorski: 'Observations about the form and meaning of the perfect.' In Michael Kenstowicz (ed.), Ken Hale: A Life in Language, 189–238. Cambridge, MA, 2001: MIT Press.
- Alexiadou, Artemis, Elena Anagnostopoulou, Sjef Barbiers & Hans-Martin Gärtner (eds.): Dimensions of Movement: from Features to Remnants. Amsterdam, 2002: John Benjamins. ISBN 978-1-58811-185-2
- Anagnostopoulou, Elena: The syntax of ditransitives: Evidence from clitics. Berlin, 2003: Mouton de Gruyter. ISBN 3-11-017028-0
- Alexiadou, Artemis, Elena Anagnostopoulou & Martin Everaert (eds.): The Unaccusativity Puzzle. Oxford, 2004: Oxford University Press. ISBN 978-0-19-925765-2
- Anagnostopoulou, Elena: 'Strong and weak person restrictions: A feature checking analysis.' In Lorie Heggie & Francisco Ordóñez (eds.), Clitic and affix combinations: Theoretical perspectives, 199–235. Amsterdam, 2005: John Benjamins.
- Alexiadou, Artemis, Elena Anagnostopoulou & Florian Schäfer: External Arguments in Transitivity Alternations. Oxford, 2015: Oxford University Press. ISBN 9780199571949
