= Geoffrey Horrocks (philologist) =

British philologist (born 1951)

- Born: 1951 (age 74–75)
- Education: University of Cambridge (PhD)
- Scientific career
- Institutions: University of Cambridge
- Thesis: A Study of some Prepositional uses in Homer (1977)
- Doctoral students: Andrew Carstairs-McCarthy

Geoffrey Horrocks (born 1951) is a British philologist and Emeritus Professor of Comparative Philology at the University of Cambridge.

== Education and early life ==
Horrocks has said that "From an early age I was always interested in languages... The key moment was at the age of 13, when I had to choose between German and Greek at school, ... and like tossing a coin[,] I chose Greek mainly because the alphabet looked intriguing. Then I found I really liked it."

Horrocks received his PhD from the University of Cambridge.

== Career ==
Horrocks is Professor of Comparative Philology and Fellow of St John's College, Cambridge. Before that he worked at the University of London.

The focus of his research is the history, change and structure of the Greek language from the earliest evidence and also the history and structure of Latin up to the early Middle Ages (also in its Italian context of the Sabellian languages and Etruscan). In linguistic terms, he is interested in linguistic theory, historical linguistics and language change as well as syntax, semantics and morphology.

His book "Review of “Greek: A History of the Language and its Speakers” was praised by academics.

Together with David Holton and with the participation of Panagiotis Toufexis, Horrocks directed the research project "Grammar of Medieval Greek" at the University of Cambridge from 2004 to 2009.

== Works ==
- David Holton, Geoffrey Horrocks, Marjolijne Janssen, Tina Lendari, Io Manolessou, Notis Toufexis, The Cambridge Grammar of Medieval and Early Modern Greek, Cambridge University Press, 2019 CUP Website
- Greek: A History of the Language and its Speakers, revised and expanded edition, Wiley-Blackwell, 2010 (1st edition 1997), online extracts — Reviews: Chiara Faraggiana di Sarzana, in: Bryn Mawr Classical Review 2011.05.20; Philippa M. Steele, in: Scholia Reviews ns 20 (2011) 5; Brian D. Joseph, in: Diachronica 18.1 (2001) 166–171, online (PDF; 99 kB).
- Geoffrey C. Horrocks, James Clackson: The Blackwell History of the Latin Language. Blackwell, Malden, Oxford, Carlton 2007, online. — Reviews: Brent Vine, in: Bryn Mawr Classical Review 2009.03.21; Hilla Halla-aho, in: Arctos 43 (2009) 243–246, online (PDF; 714 kB).
- Artemis Alexiadou, Geoffrey C. Horrocks, Melita Stavrou (ed.): Studies in Greek syntax. Springer, Heidelberg 1998 (Studies in Natural Language and Linguistic Theory, Bd. 43),
- Brian D. Joseph, Geoffrey C. Horrocks, Irene Philippaki-Warburton (ed.): Themes in Greek linguistics II. John Benjamins Publishing Company, Amsterdam 1998 (Amsterdam studies in the theory and history of linguistic science, Series IV: Current issues in linguistic theory, Band 159), online.
- Generative Grammar. Longman/Pearson, London, 1987.
- Space and time in Homer. Prepositional and adverbial particles in the Greek epic. Arno Press New York, 1983, online.
