= Volos =

City in Thessaly, Greece

Volos Βόλος
- Municipality
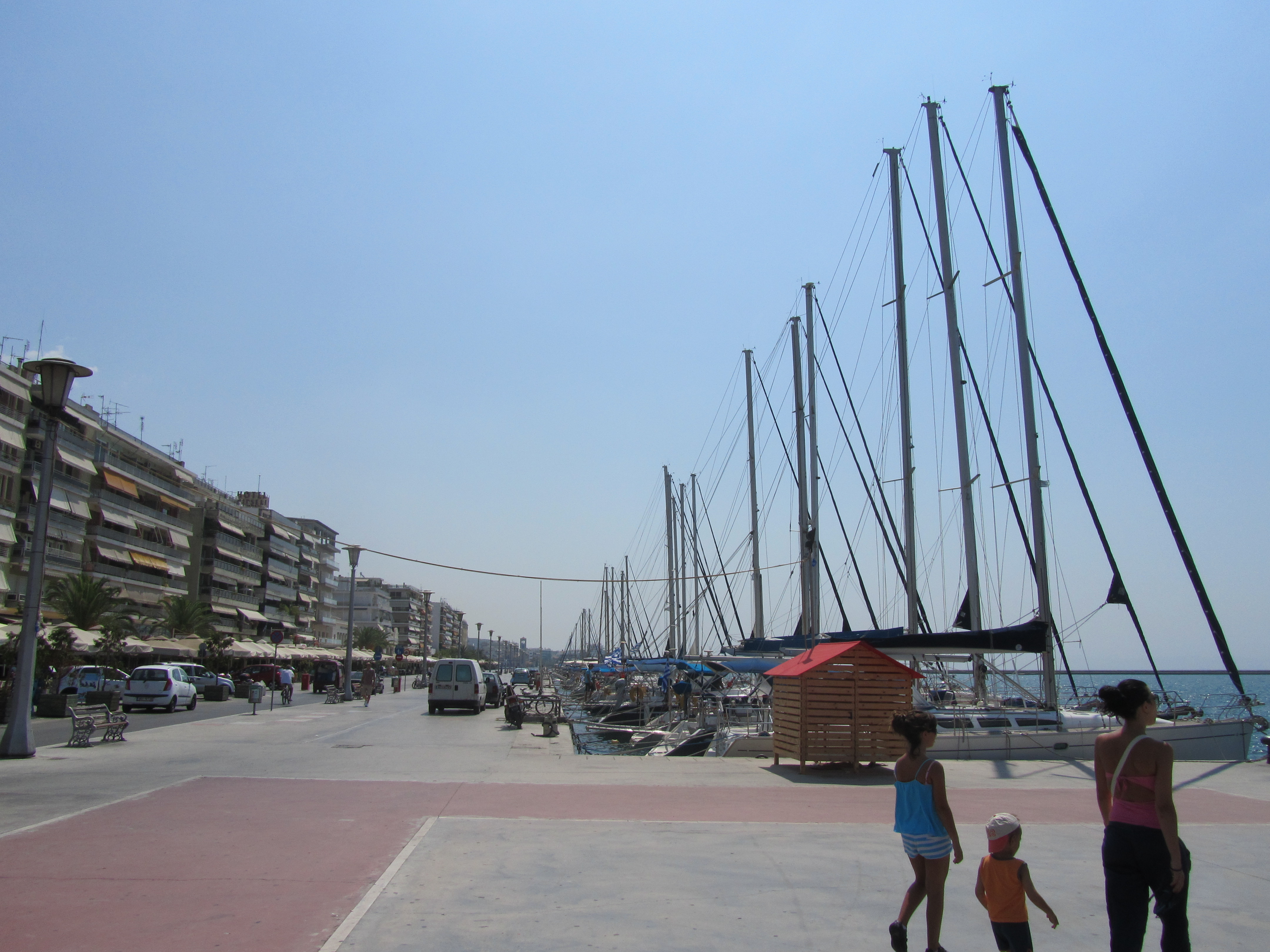
- View to Volos's promenade and port

- Seal

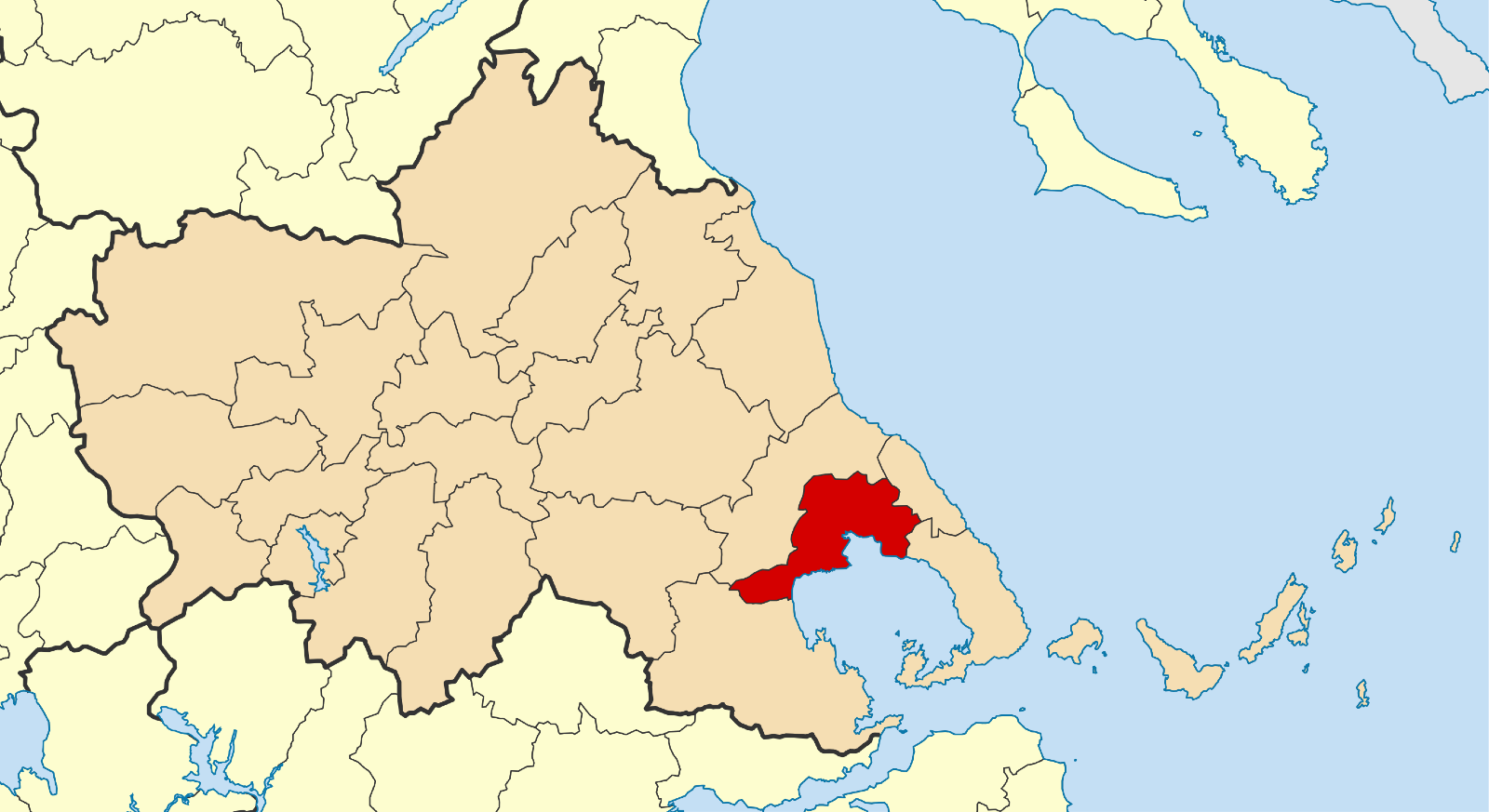

- Location within Greece
- Coordinates: 39°22′N 22°56′E
- Country: Greece
- Administrative region: Thessaly
- Regional unit: Magnesia
- Districts: 18

Government
  - Mayor: Achilleas Beos (since 2014)

Area
  - Municipality: 385.6 km^{2} (148.9 sq mi)
  - Municipal unit: 108.6 km^{2} (41.9 sq mi)
- Elevation: 15 m (49 ft)

Population (2021)
  - Municipality: 139,670
  - Density: 362.2/km^{2} (938.1/sq mi)
  - Municipal unit: 85,803
  - Municipal unit density: 790.1/km^{2} (2,046/sq mi)
- Time zone: UTC+2 (EET)
  - Summer (DST): UTC+3 (EEST)
- Postal code: 38x xx
- Area code: 2421x
- Vehicle registration: ΒΟx (ended), ΒΒx (current use)
- Website: www.volos-city.gr

Volos (/ˈvɒlɒs/; Greek: Βόλος [ˈvolos]) is a coastal port city in Thessaly situated midway on the Greek mainland, about 170 kilometres (106 miles) north of Athens and 140 kilometres (87 miles) south of Thessaloniki. It is the capital of the Magnesia regional unit of the Thessaly Region. Volos is also the only outlet to the sea from Thessaly, the country's largest agricultural region. With a population of 85,803 (2021), the city is an important industrial centre, and its port provides a "bridge" between Europe and Asia.

Volos is the newest of the Greek port cities, with a large proportion of modern buildings erected following catastrophic earthquakes in 1955. It includes the municipal units of Volos, and Iolkos, as well as smaller suburban communities. The economy of the city is based on manufacturing, trade, services and tourism. Home to the University of Thessaly, the city also offers facilities for conferences, exhibitions and major sporting, cultural and scientific events. Volos participated in the 2004 Olympic Games, and the city has since played host to other athletic events, such as the European Athletic Championships. Volos hosted the 7th International Olympiad on Astronomy and Astrophysics from 27 July to 5 August 2013.

== Location ==
Built at the innermost point of the Pagasetic Gulf and at the foot of Mount Pilio (Pelion, the land of the Centaurs). The city spreads in the plain on the foothills of Mount Pelion, bordering the town of Agria to the east and Nea Anchialos to the southwest. Volos's municipality includes both towns, along with many nearby villages, including Makrinitsa and Portaria.

Volos is a major commercial port of mainland Greece in the Aegean sea (after Piraeus and Thessaloniki), with connection by ferry and hydrofoil to the nearby Sporades Islands, which include Skiathos, Skopelos and Alonissos. There are also connections to Lemnos, Lesbos, Chios and Skyros.

== History ==
=== Antiquity ===
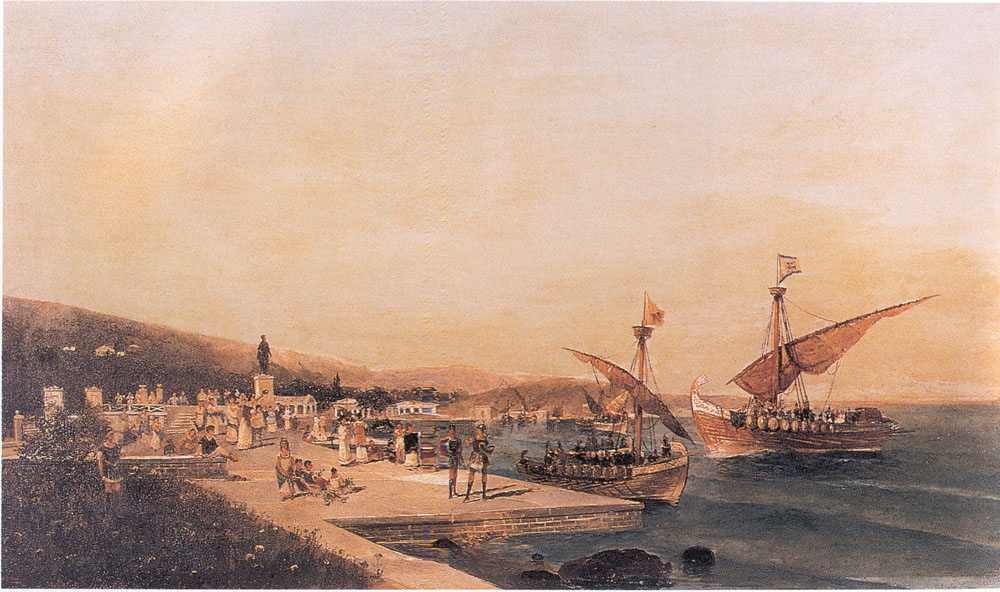
The return of the Argonauts by Constantine Volanakis (1837–1907).

Modern Volos is built on the area of the ancient cities of Demetrias, Pagasae and Iolcos. Demetrias was established in 293 BC by Demetrius Poliorcetes, King of Macedon. Iolcus, or Iolkos, was known in mythology as the homeland of the hero Jason, who boarded the ship Argo accompanied by the Argonauts and sailed in quest of the Golden Fleece to Colchis. To the west of Volos lie the Neolithic settlements of Dimini, with a ruined acropolis, walls, and two beehive tombs dating to between 4000 and 1200 BC, and Sesklo, with the remains of the oldest acropolis in Greece (6000 BC). The mound of Kastro/Palaia in western Volos is the site of a Bronze Age settlement, including a Mycenaean palace complex where a couple of preserved Linear B tablets have been found.

=== Byzantine era ===
Iolcus is still attested in the early Byzantine period but was eclipsed for most of the Middle Ages by Demetrias. The Slavic tribe of the Belegezites settled in the area during the 7th century.

Volos first appears again in 1333, as one of the cities captured by the Byzantine general John Monomachos in Thessaly, under the name "Golos" (Γόλος). The name is of Slavic origin, from golo, golъ, "barren". Another theory derives the name from Slavic golosh, "seat of administration". Two alternative theories allude to a Greek origin through the words βολή (throw), as fishermen threw their nets into the sea from that area, and βώλος (piece of land) but the Greek scholar G. Hatzidakis considers them to be paretymologies at best. The modern form of the name is first attested in 1540.

The walls of medieval Golos follow the traces of the fortifications of ancient Iolcus, and many remnants of the ancient city have been found in the medieval citadel.

Along with the rest of Thessaly, Volos fell under Serbian rule in 1348, governed by Gregory Preljub. After Preljub's death Thessaly passed under the brief rule of Nikephoros II Orsini, followed by the Serbian rulers Simeon Uroš and John Uroš. After the latter's death in 1373, Thessaly returned under Byzantine rule for twenty years, until its conquest by the Ottoman Empire under Sultan Bayezid I.

=== Ottoman era ===
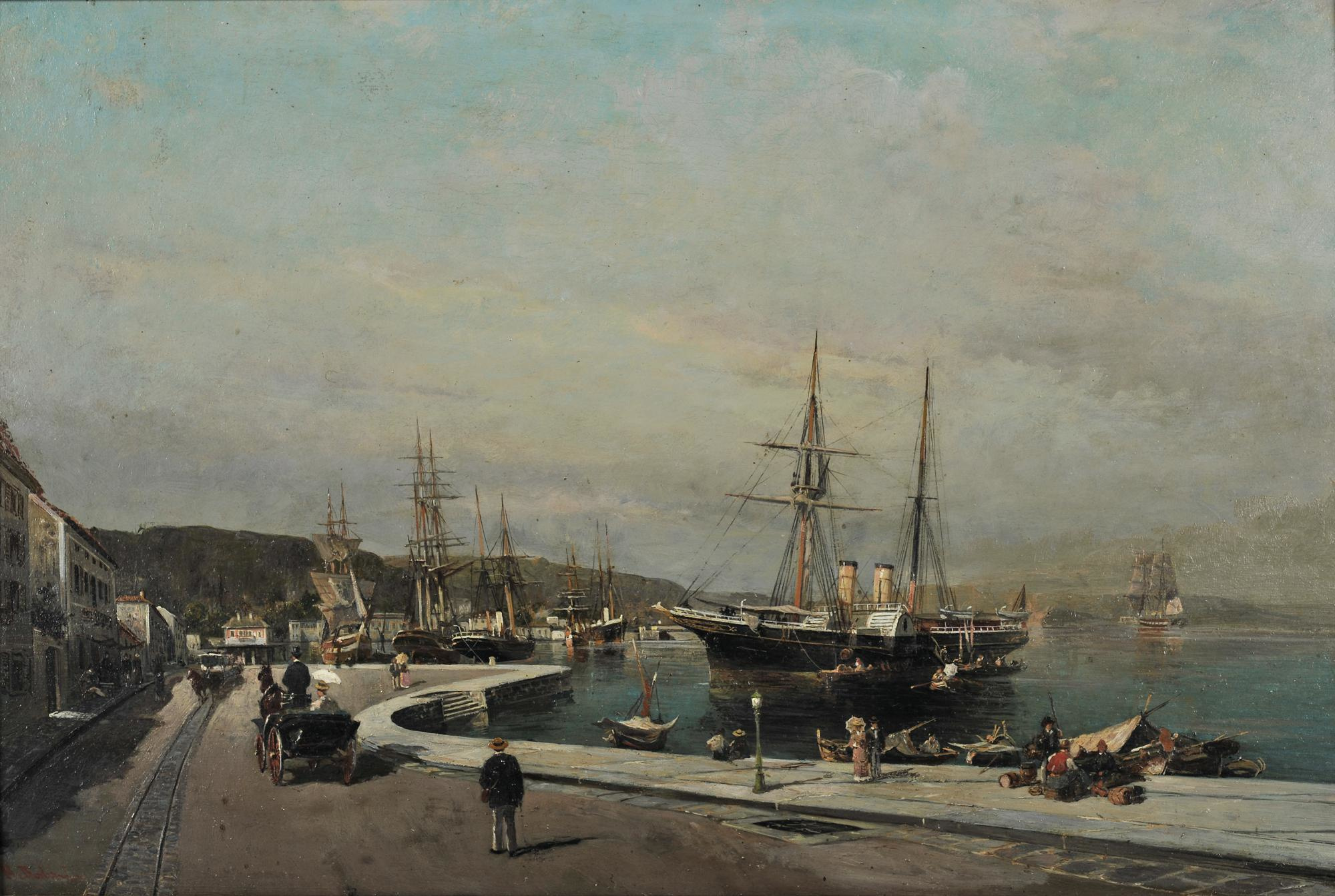
The port of Volos by Constantine Volanakis (c.1875).

Ottoman rule was not yet firm. The first period of Ottoman control lasted from 1393 to 1397, followed by another c. 1403, but it was not until 1423 that Volos was definitively incorporated into the Ottoman Empire. The Ottoman name of the city was Ottoman Turkish: قلز, romanized: Quluz. The Ottomans strengthened the town's fortifications against a possible Venetian attack, and installed not only a garrison, but also Muslim settlers from Anatolia. The local Christian population in turn moved to the slopes of Pelion. From this time on, Volos became the chief settlement on the Pagasetic Gulf.

The city began to spread outside its walls in the late 16th/early 17th centuries, coinciding with a growth in commerce, helped by the city's famed twice-weekly local fair and the first works at the waterfront harbour. The fortress was captured by the Venetians under Francesco Morosini in 1665, during the Cretan War, but recovered and refortified by the Ottomans.

In May 1821, at the beginning of the Greek Revolution, the Greek rebels of Mount Pelion tried to capture the fortress but failed. On 8 April 1827, the Greek fleet, under the command of the British philhellene Frank Abney Hastings, captured five Ottoman ships in the city's harbour and forced the local garrison to evacuate the fortress. The provisional government of Greece claimed Volos as part of Greek national territory, but the Treaty of Constantinople (1832), which established a Greek independent state, set its northern boundary along a line running south from Arta to Volos. Volos was incorporated into the Greek Kingdom in November 1881 with the rest of Thessaly.

=== Modern Volos ===
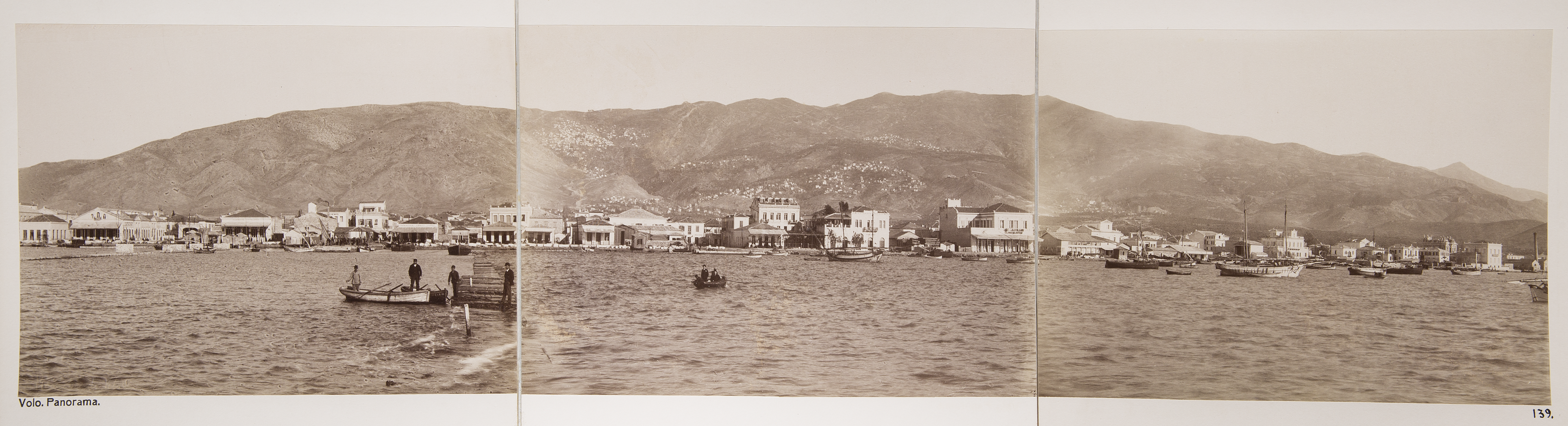
Photo of 1896

After its incorporation into the Greek Kingdom, the town had a population of only 4,900, but grew rapidly in the next four decades as merchants, businessmen, craftsmen and sailors gravitated toward it from the surrounding area. In the 1920s a large influx of refugees to the settlement took place, especially from Ionia, but also from Pontus, Cappadocia and Eastern Thrace. In 1882, Andreas Syngros established the Privileged Bank of Epirothessaly, which the National Bank of Greece acquired in 1899 after its founder's death. Volos was occupied by Ottomans on 8 May 1897, during the Greco Turkish War.

The city had a vibrant Jewish community in the early 20th century: from ≈500 in 1896, it rose to ≈2,000 in 1930, before falling drastically to 882 members in 1940, because of emigration to the great cities of Thessaloniki and Athens or abroad. During the Axis occupation of Greece, the prompt actions of the local rabbi, Moshe Pesach, and the Greek authorities saved about 700 of the local Jewish community from deportation to the Nazi death camps.

After an aerial attack by Italian troops in November 1940 and another by the Germans in 1941, many of the city's inhabitants took refuge in the villages of Pelion. Abandoning Volos after Italy's capitulation in September 1943, the Italians left storerooms full of food, arms and ammunition. Large quantities of this material was transported with the Pelion railway to the mountain village Milies and under the supervision of ELAS loaded onto mules and taken to secure hideaways. When the Germans set off a column to Milies an officer and a soldier were killed by resistance fighters. In reprisal nearly the whole village was burnt down by German occupation troops on 4 October 1943. According to the official report of the municipality the Germans executed 25 men, and three inhabitants died in their houses from the flames.

Volos is also well known for its assortment of mezedes and a clear alcoholic beverage known as tsipouro.

A street in a sister city, Rostov-on-Don, bears the name Улица Греческого Города Волос (Street of the Greek City of Volos), weaving through a mix of early 20th-century buildings with characteristic inner yards, tiered balconies and open iron stairs that lend the old Rostov its characteristic Mediterranean look.

In September 2023 the city of Volos was flooded by massive rain.

== Administration ==
The municipality Volos was formed at the 2011 local government reform by the merger of the following nine former municipalities, that became municipal units:

- Agria
- Aisonia
- Artemida
- Iolcos
- Makrinitsa
- Nea Anchialos
- Nea Ionia
- Portaria
- Volos

The municipality has an area of 385.614 km^{2}, the municipal unit 108.6 km^{2}.

=== Province ===
The province of Volos (Greek: Επαρχία Βόλου) was one of the provinces of the Magnesia Prefecture. Its territory corresponded with that of the current municipalities Volos, Rigas Feraios, South Pelion and Zagora-Mouresi. It was abolished in 2006.

== Geography ==
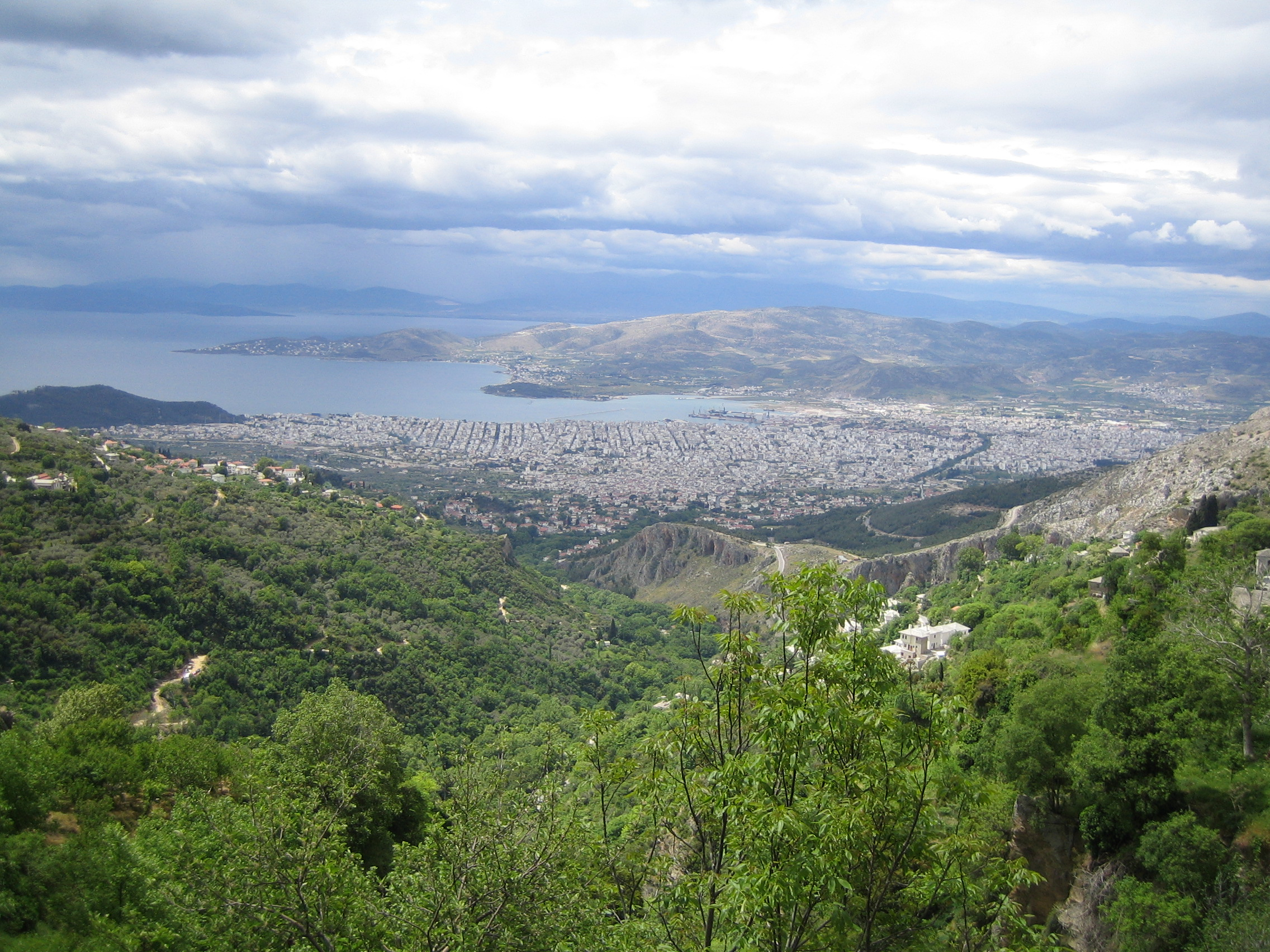
Volos panorama from Pelion mountain.

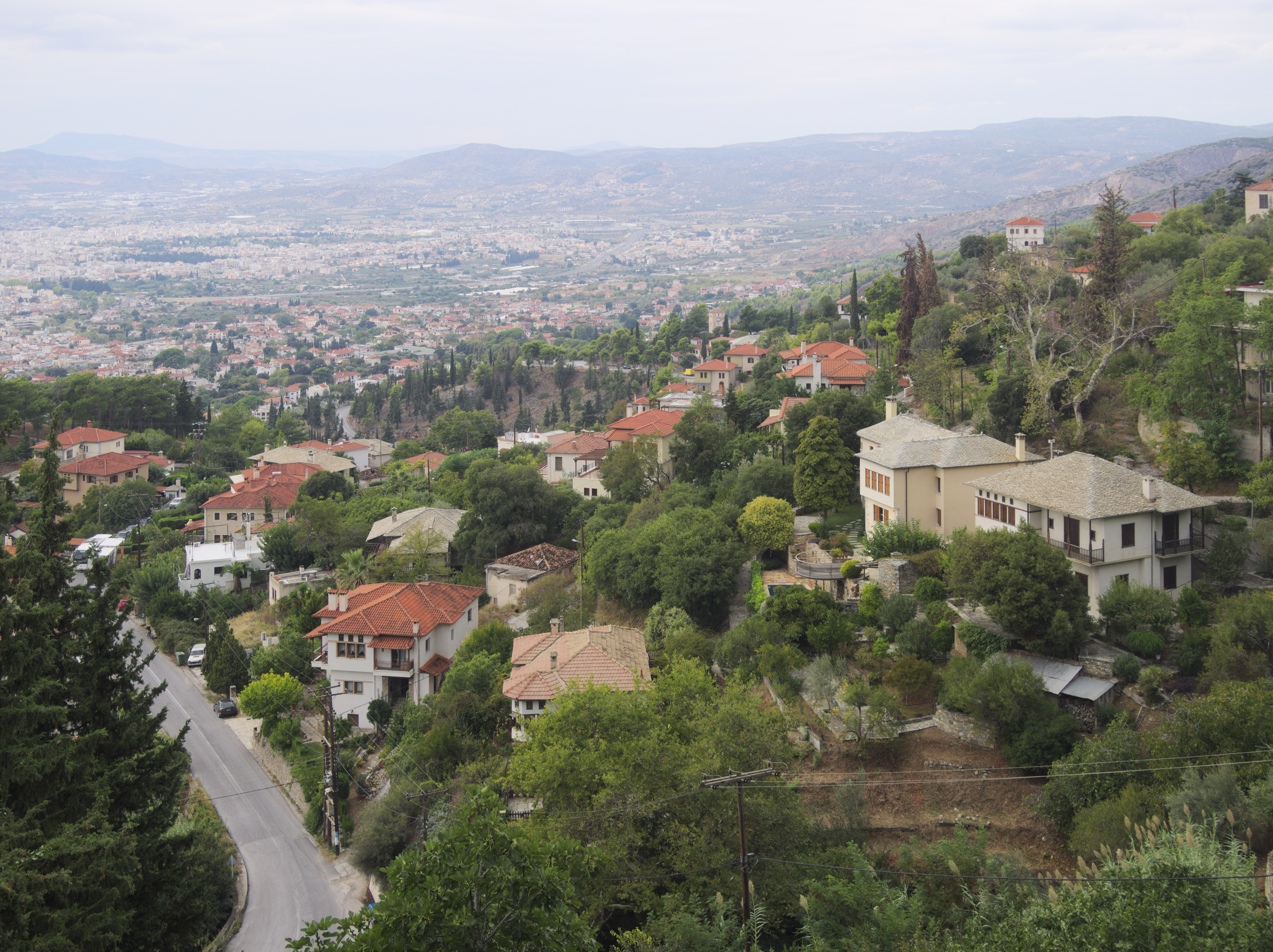
Upper part of the town (Ano Volos)

Climate graph of Volos.

Volos is the administrative centre of the Magnesia regional unit. Many of the city domains are separated through natural barricades, such as rivers.

Three main rivers/mountain torrents all rise from mount Pelion (with its peak at 1,610 metres (5,280 feet)), crossing the city to create a unique urban geography, before ending in the Pagasetic Gulf flowing west. The Anavros river, famous for Jason's pass, divides the Nea Demetriada district from the rest of the urban area. Krafsidonas is the major river passing through the city and constitutes the natural lung of the urbanized area of Volos, as well as the boundary between the major municipalities of the metropolitan city, the municipalities of Volos and Nea Ionia. Xirias (Ξηριάς), is the largest torrent in the metropolitan urban area of Volos and passes through the Nea Ionia municipal area.

=== Climate ===
Volos experiences a cold semi-arid climate (Köppen climate classification BSk), with neither particularly high nor extremely low temperatures throughout the year. Its climate is one of fairly low humidity, favorable for all kinds of activities. Measurable rainfall occurs on average around 89 days per year. Thunderstorms occur sparsely throughout the year, more often during the warmer months. Snow occurs more or less every year on a few occasions, though it usually doesn't cause disruption to daily life. The Pelion mountain, with its own microclimate, affects the city's weather, acting as a rain shadow to the north-easterly winds thus limiting the amount of precipitation the city receives in comparison to the eastern side of the mountain. Average temperature values, like in most regions, have slightly increased in more recent periods.

Climate data for Volos (1958–1983)
Month	Jan	Feb	Mar	Apr	May	Jun	Jul	Aug	Sep	Oct	Nov	Dec	Year
Record high °C (°F)	23.0 (73.4)	24.7 (76.5)	28.7 (83.7)	34.0 (93.2)	35.2 (95.4)	37.8 (100.0)	44.2 (111.6)	39.6 (103.3)	36.8 (98.2)	30.4 (86.7)	27.2 (81.0)	24.4 (75.9)	44.2 (111.6)
Mean daily maximum °C (°F)	11.3 (52.3)	12.9 (55.2)	15.0 (59.0)	19.4 (66.9)	24.0 (75.2)	28.5 (83.3)	31.0 (87.8)	30.6 (87.1)	27.0 (80.6)	21.7 (71.1)	17.3 (63.1)	13.2 (55.8)	21.0 (69.8)
Daily mean °C (°F)	7.8 (46.0)	9.0 (48.2)	11.3 (52.3)	15.4 (59.7)	20.1 (68.2)	24.6 (76.3)	27.0 (80.6)	26.6 (79.9)	22.9 (73.2)	17.7 (63.9)	13.3 (55.9)	9.5 (49.1)	17.4 (63.3)
Mean daily minimum °C (°F)	4.5 (40.1)	5.4 (41.7)	7.3 (45.1)	10.5 (50.9)	14.9 (58.8)	19.0 (66.2)	21.3 (70.3)	21.2 (70.2)	17.9 (64.2)	13.6 (56.5)	9.8 (49.6)	6.3 (43.3)	12.6 (54.7)
Record low °C (°F)	−8.2 (17.2)	−7.8 (18.0)	−3.2 (26.2)	1.8 (35.2)	6.2 (43.2)	11.6 (52.9)	14.0 (57.2)	14.8 (58.6)	9.2 (48.6)	1.4 (34.5)	0.6 (33.1)	−6.0 (21.2)	−8.2 (17.2)
Average precipitation mm (inches)	58.4 (2.30)	35.4 (1.39)	40.5 (1.59)	27.3 (1.07)	32.5 (1.28)	22.5 (0.89)	15.1 (0.59)	10.9 (0.43)	45.0 (1.77)	51.8 (2.04)	52.2 (2.06)	47.2 (1.86)	428.8 (16.88)
Average precipitation days (≥ 1.0 mm)	10.5	9.7	9.9	8.2	6.6	5.2	2.8	2.7	5.3	8.1	10.1	10.1	89.2
Average relative humidity (%)	72.7	70.0	69.5	65.7	65.0	61.2	58.1	60.1	65.5	70.4	74.0	73.7	67.2
Mean monthly sunshine hours	102.7	109.8	150.5	200.8	260.3	290.2	337.1	320.1	240.6	167.8	122.0	100.0	2,401.9
Source: Meteovolos

== Architecture ==
Two of the most known churches of Volos, St Nicholas and St Constantine and Helen on the promenade, were designed by architect Aristotelis Zachos. Volos was once also characterised by a number of old mansions, the majority of which were destroyed after the earthquakes in 1955. Nowadays, only some of them have been saved, restored and have a new, mainly public, use.

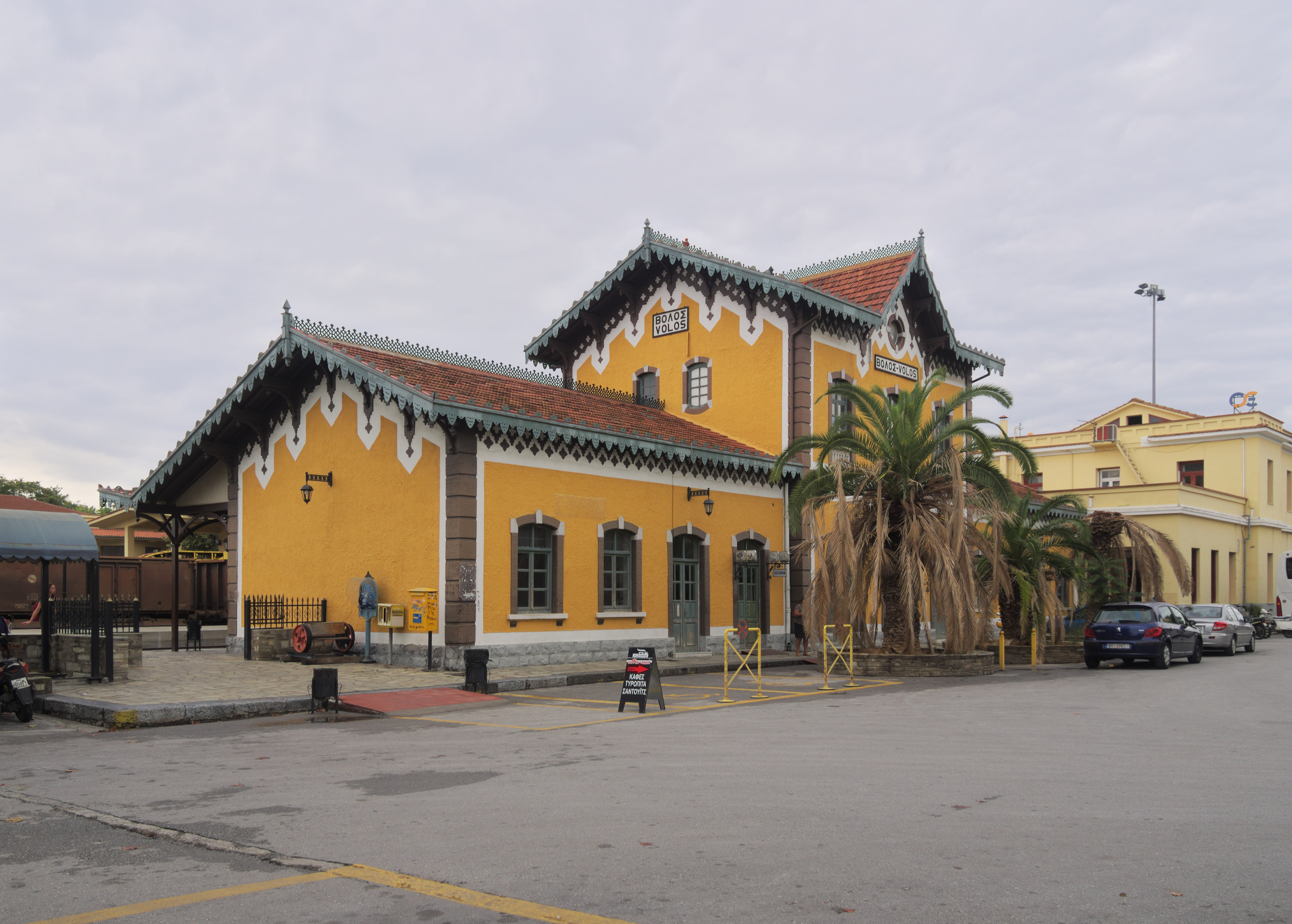
The railway station, designed by Evaristo De Chirico.

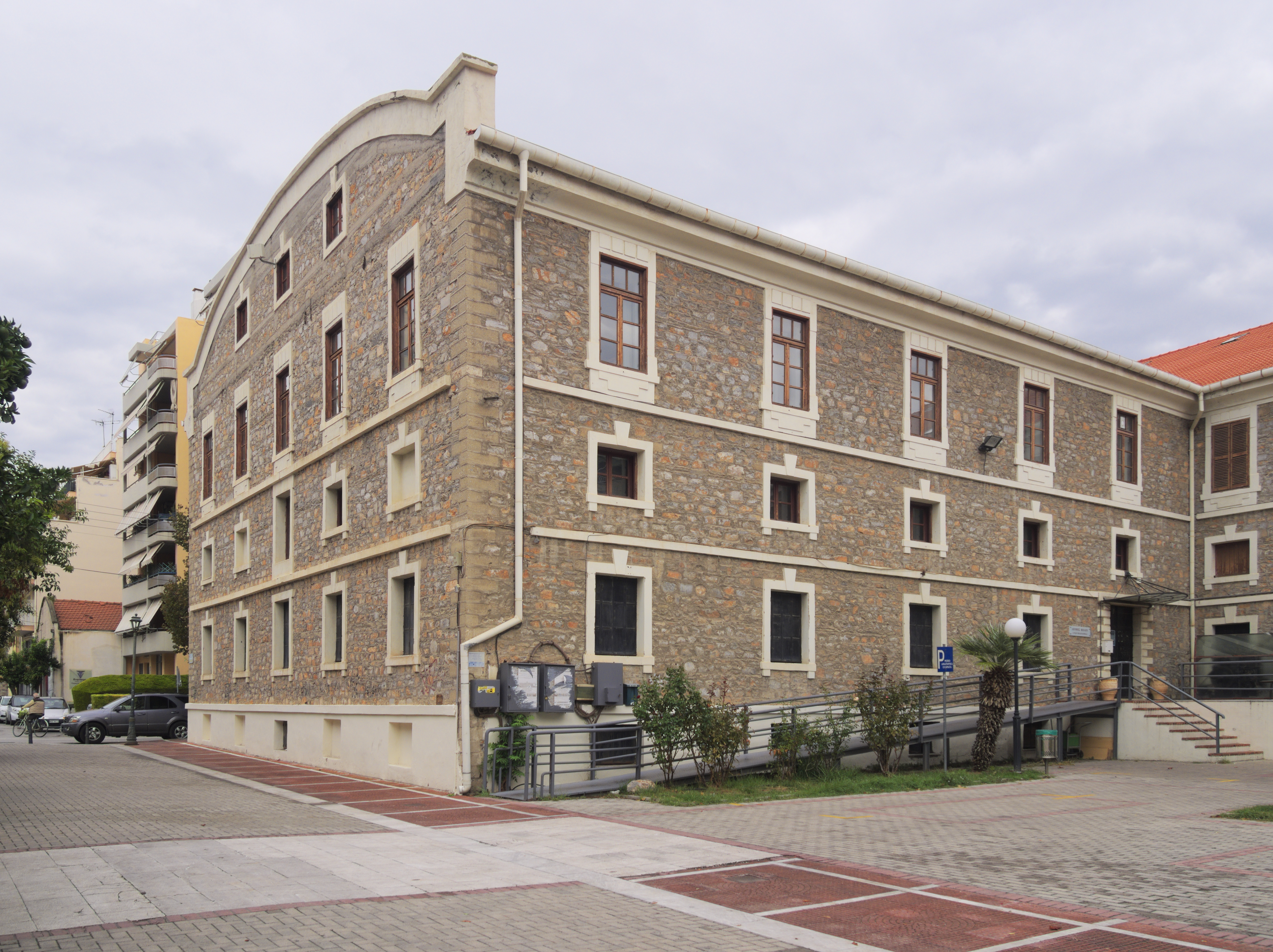
The old Spierer tobacco warehouse

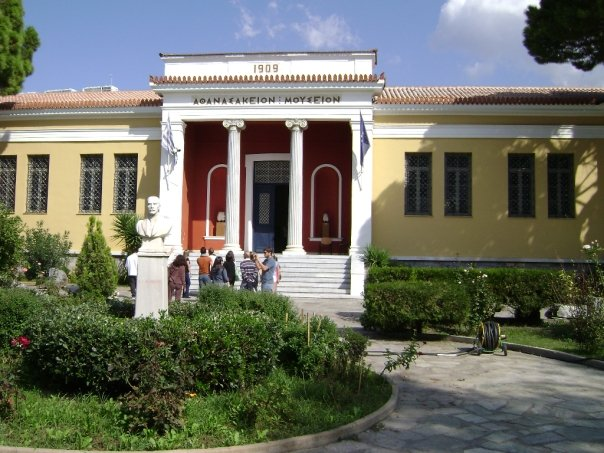
Archaeological Museum of Volos

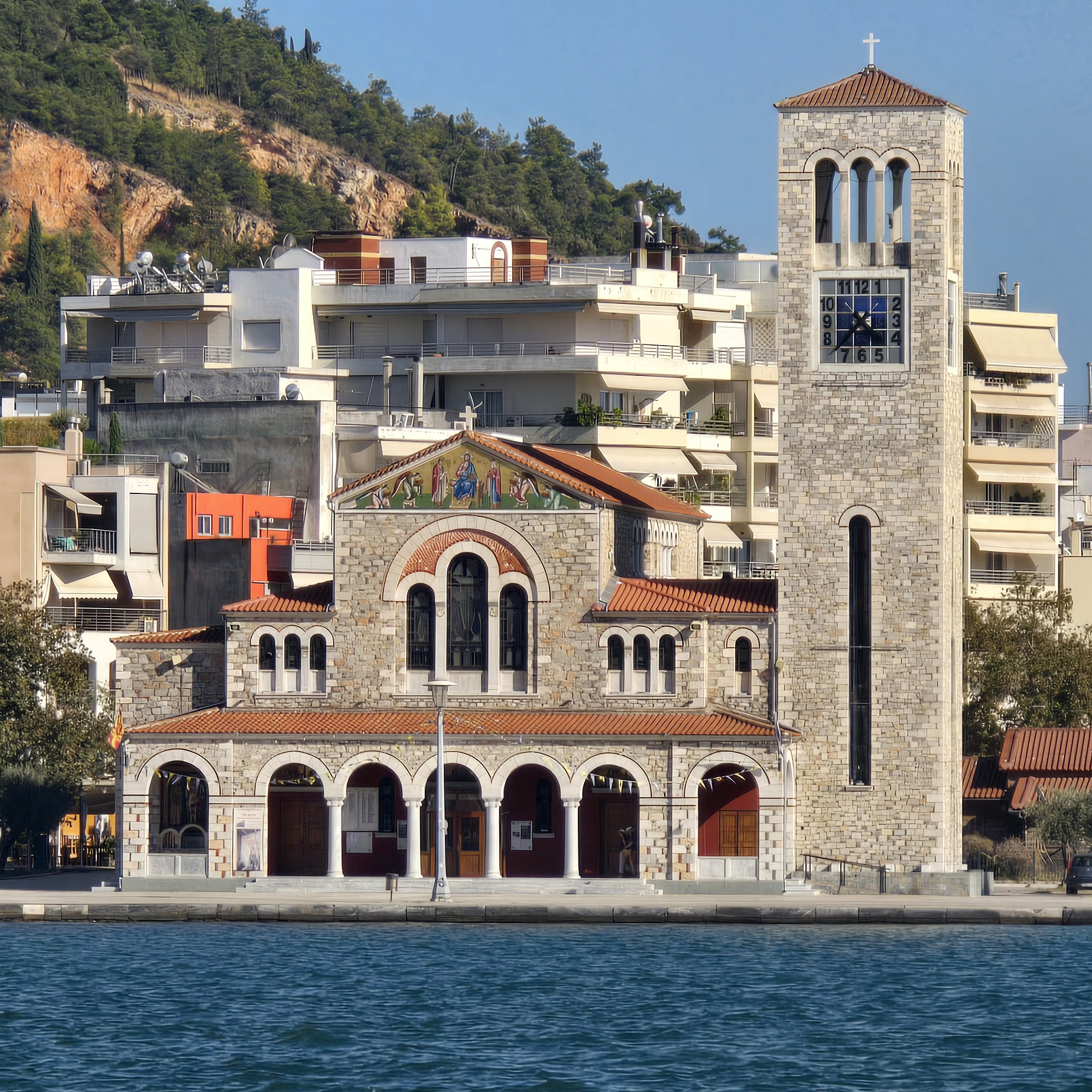
Church of Saints Constantine and Helen

The development of the new city coincided with the flourishing of neoclassicism. Public buildings conformed to this style and private buildings belonging to prosperous merchants were particularly sophisticated. Typical examples include:

- The 3-story Hotel de France, with its impressive decorative murals (1894, Iasonos and K. Kartali Street)
- Old Tobacco Factory of Matsaggos (1890)
- Yellow Tobacco Warehouse (1926)
- The National Bank, formerly the Privileged Bank of Epirothessaly (1895)
- The Bank of Athens (1903, today the library of University of Thessaly)
- The Achillopouleion Hospital (1901)
- The Archaeological Museum of Volos, Athanasakeio (1909)
- The Agricultural Bank (1909, formerly the Kosmadopoulos Bank)
- The Cine-theater Achilleion (1925)
- The Aegli Hotel, (1927), designed by Kassiopoulos
- The Building of the Air-force High officials Club near Agios Konstantinos Park, believed to have been designed by Le Corbusier
- The Bank of Greece building (1935)
- Municipal conservatory of Volos
- The old factory of Tsalapatas
- Tsikrikis Mansion
- Kitsos Makris's house (today Kitsos Makris Folklore Centre)
- Volos City Hall
- The Railway Station of Volos, designed by Evaristo De Chirico
- The Averofeian Courthouse
- The family houses of Kartalis, Glavanis, Kastemis, Saratsis
- The Sarafopoulos Mansion (1927), today the Volos Club
- The well-preserved Regas house and its singular decorative murals, today the Lyceum of Greek women

== Districts ==
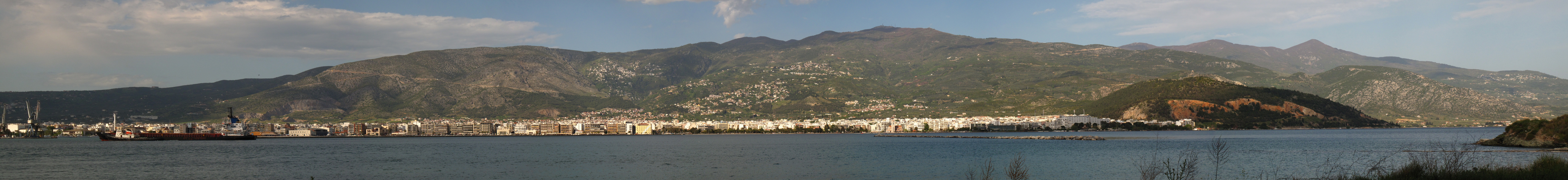
General view

City Centre (50,249)

- Agios Nikolaos
- Kallithea
- Hiliadou
- Oxygono
- Epta Platania
- Ilissia
- Agios Konstantinos
- Anavros
- Agios Gerasimos
- Agios Vasileios
- Palia
- Analipsi
- Metamorfosi
- Karagats

North (9,247)

- Agia Paraskevi
- Agios Georgios
- Aerokampos

East (11,514)

- Nea Dimitriada

North-West (33,815)

- Nea Ionia
- Melissatika
- Fytoko

South-West (20,403)

- Agii Anargyri
- Neapoli
- Aivaliotika
- Pefkakia
- Alykes

== Education ==
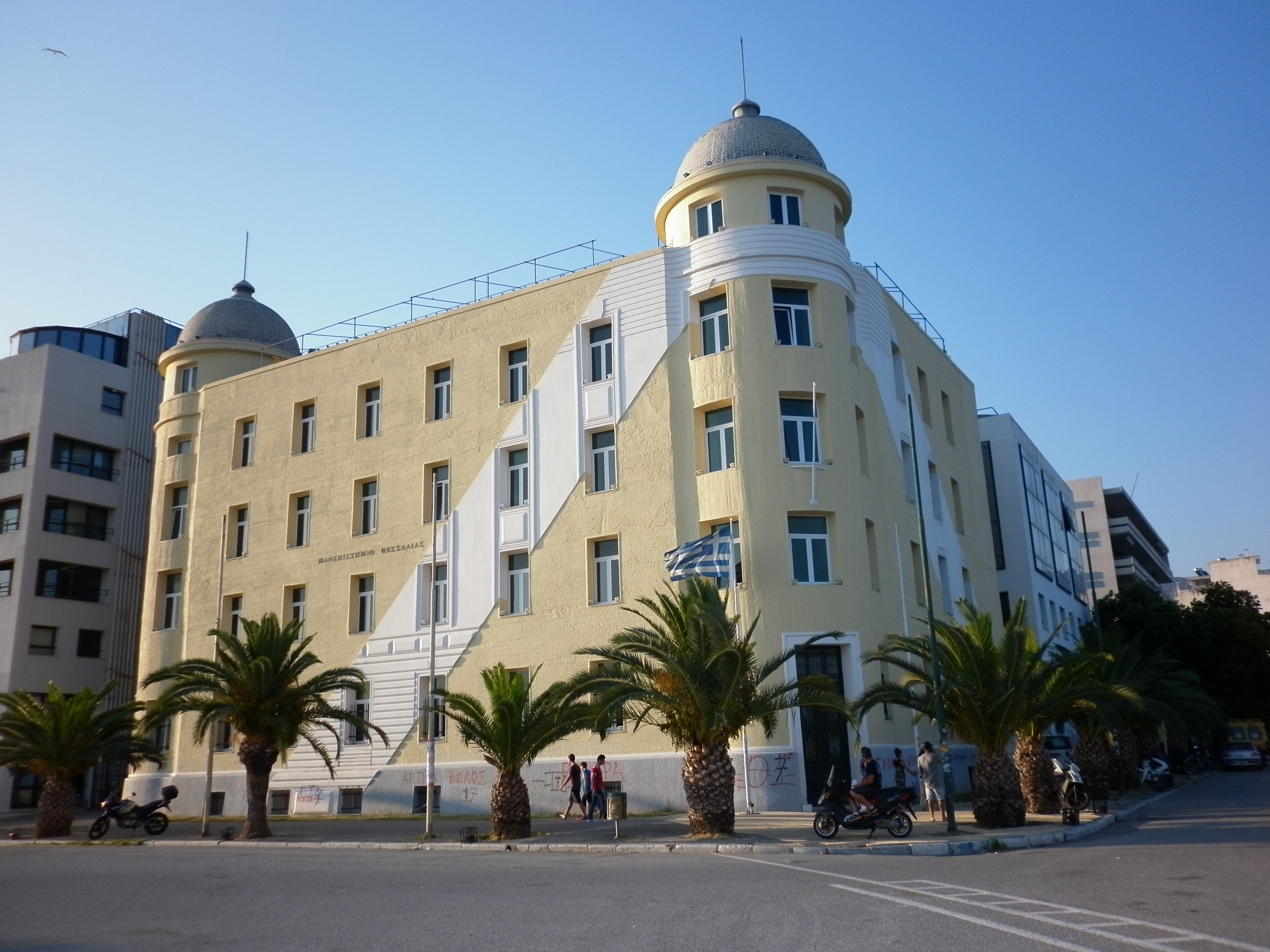
The administrative building of the University of Thessaly at the promenade

The city of Volos consists of the administrative and academic centre of University of Thessaly, which was founded in 1984, and is the most important centre of education in central Greece. The faculties of Engineering, Humanities and Social Sciences and Agricultural Sciences, with their twelve departments, are based in Volos, emphasising the academic, economic and cultural development of the city. The faculties are located in different areas of the city; “Pedion Areos” Campus is used by the Departments of the School of Engineering, while the School of Humanities and Social Sciences is located in the centre of Volos. The School of Agricultural Sciences is based in a renovated building in Fytoko. In addition to Greek students, the city and the university attract many foreign students via Erasmus and other programmes.

In addition, in the city, there are 56 kindergartens, 51 primary schools, 18 junior high schools and 13 senior high schools.

== Economy ==
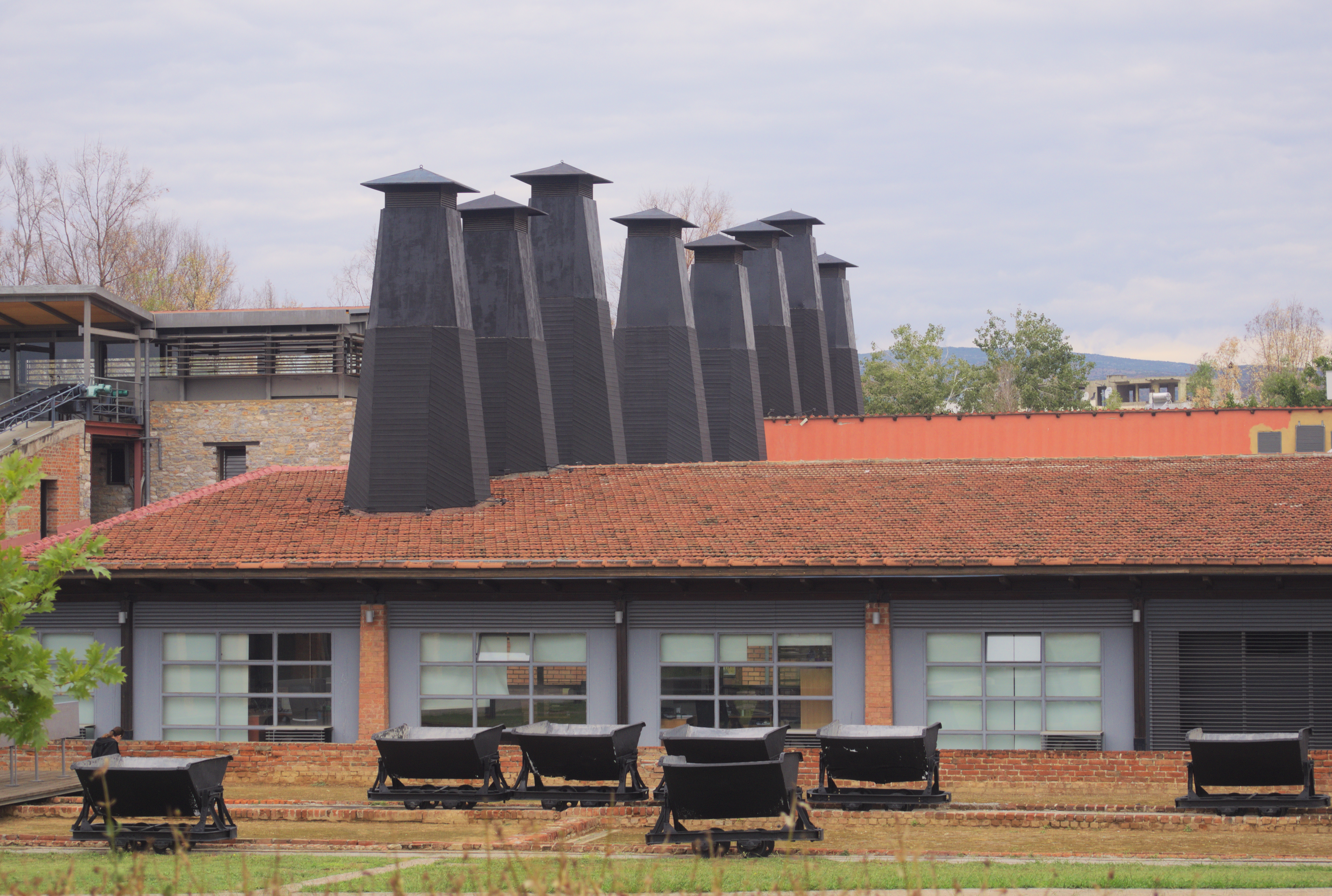
The rooftile and brickworks museum of the old Tsalapatas factory

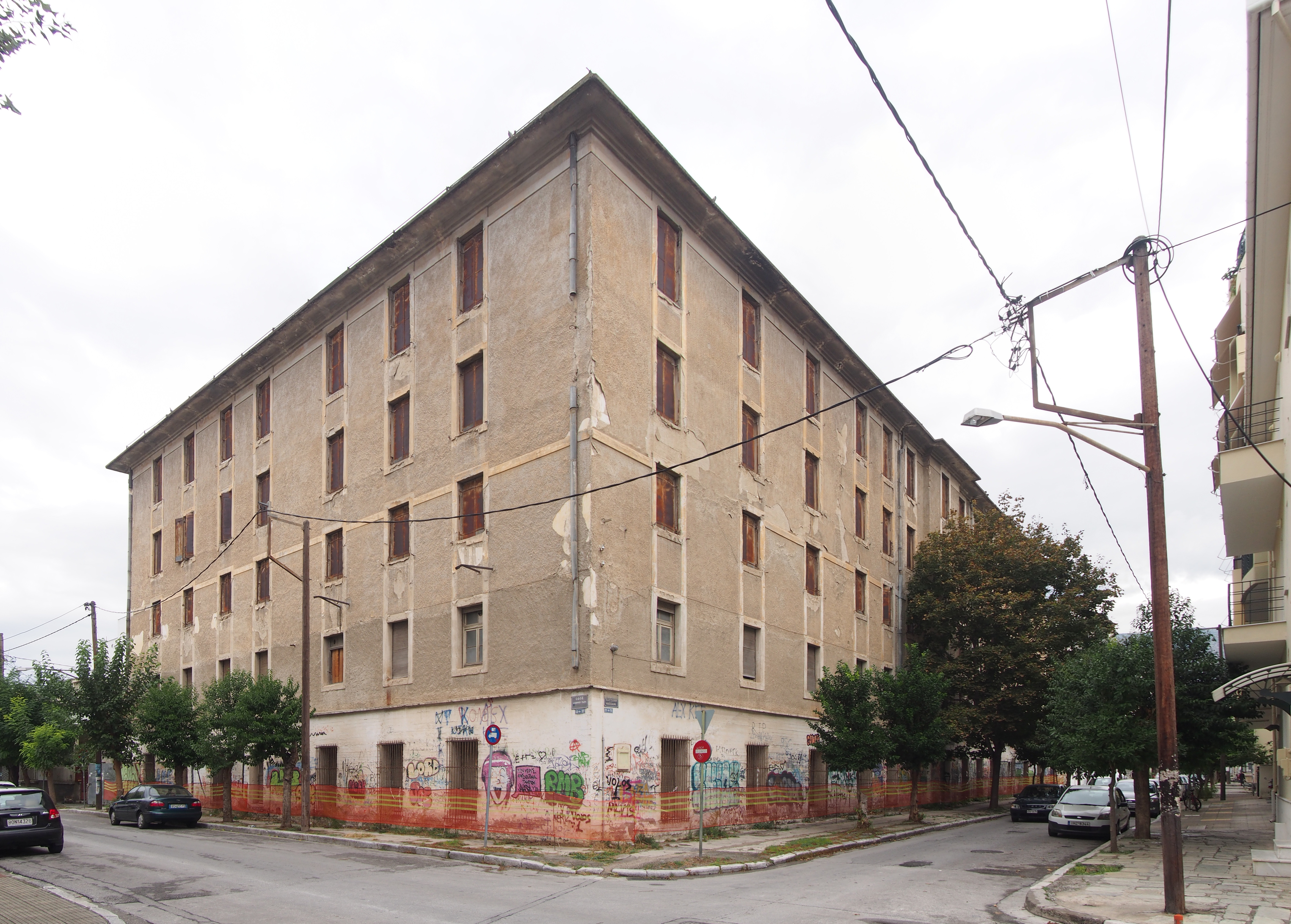
Tobacco warehouse (1926)

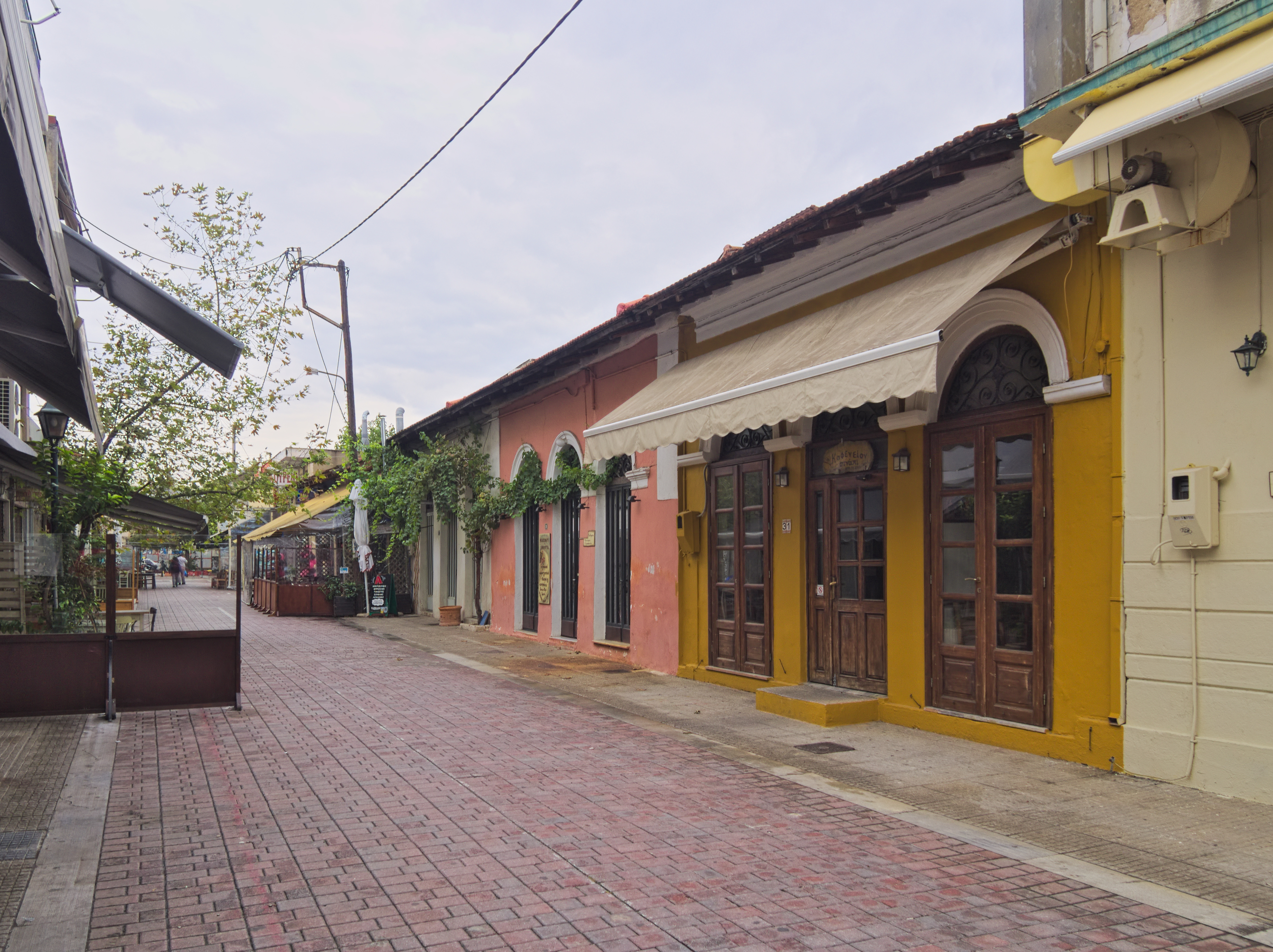
Old stores of Volos, Paliá quarter

Volos is one of the most industrialized provincial cities of Greece, because of its strategic location between the largest population centers of the country (Athens – Thessaloníki) and its port. Industry is intensely specialized in steel production and manufacturing. Three major steel producers (METKA, SIDENOR and Hellenic Steel Industry (Ελληνική Χαλυβουργία)) have production facilities in the industrial areas of Volos and nearby Almyros. AGET Heracles, a member of the Lafarge group, operates one of the largest cement facilities in the world (with capacity exceeding 7,000,000 tn) with its own private port, next to the city. Volos is also active in the research sector, hosting the Institute of Bio-Economy and Agri-Technology (iBO), one of the five Institutes of the Center for Research and Technology – Hellas (CERTH).

== Port ==
The port lies upon the ancient Thessalian settlement of Iolkos. According to Greek mythology, this was where the hero Jason built his trireme, Argo, and along with his oarsmen set course for Colchis, bringing back and marrying priestess Medea.

The new port was founded in 1893 and was the most significant element in the industrial development of the area. Today, Volos has the third-largest cargo port in Greece (after Piraeus and Thessaloniki), carrying agricultural and industrial products. In the past, it was home to a maritime link with Tartus, Syria.

Ferries and flying dolphins operate daily, connecting Volos to the Magnesia islands of the Sporades, (Skiathos, Skopelos, Alonissos). In addition, many cruise ships use the port of Volos as a destination. During the summers of 2015 and 2016, more than 100 cruises arrived in Volos, carrying more than 100,000 visitors.

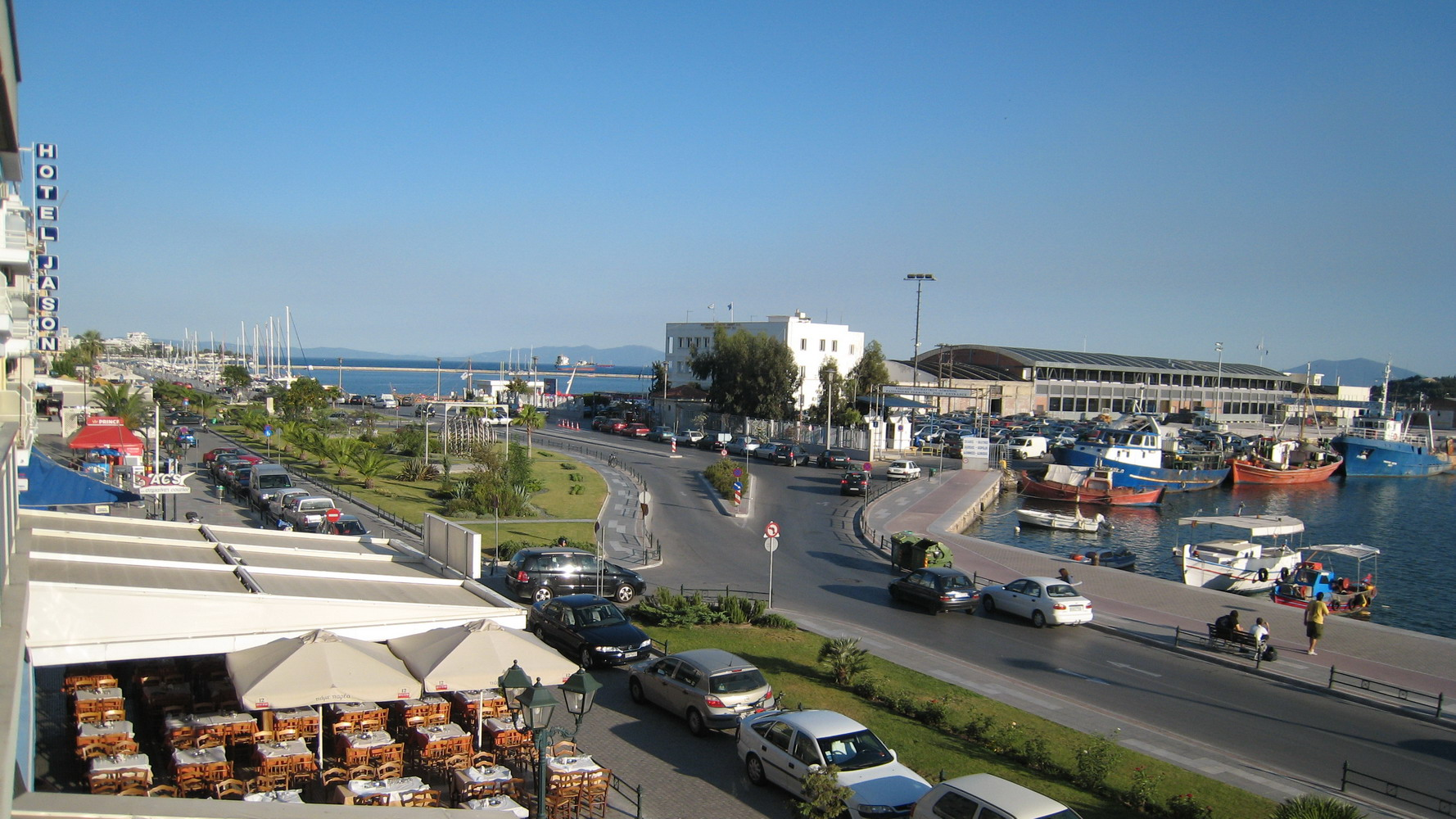
View of the port.

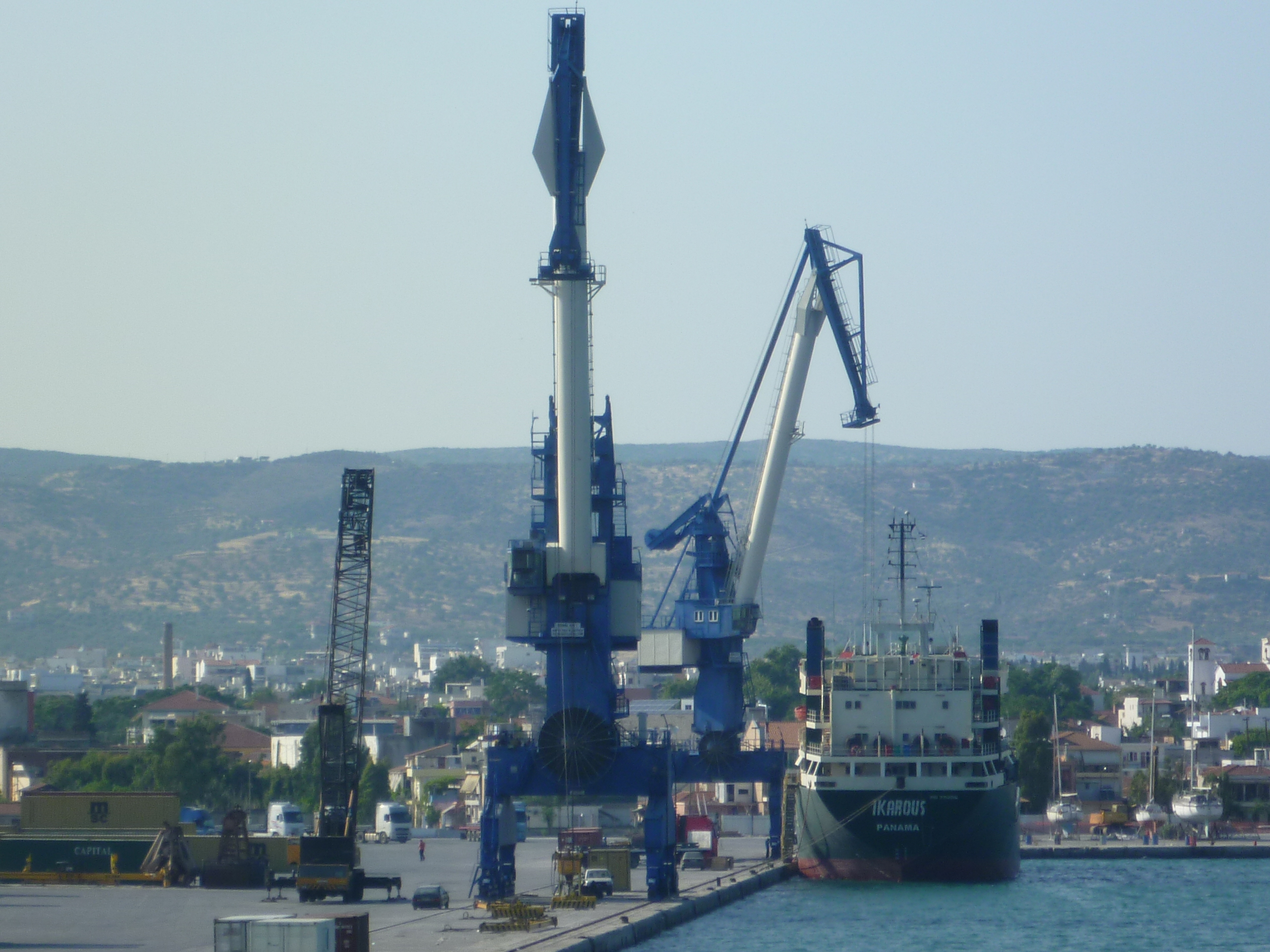
Cargo ship at the harbour.

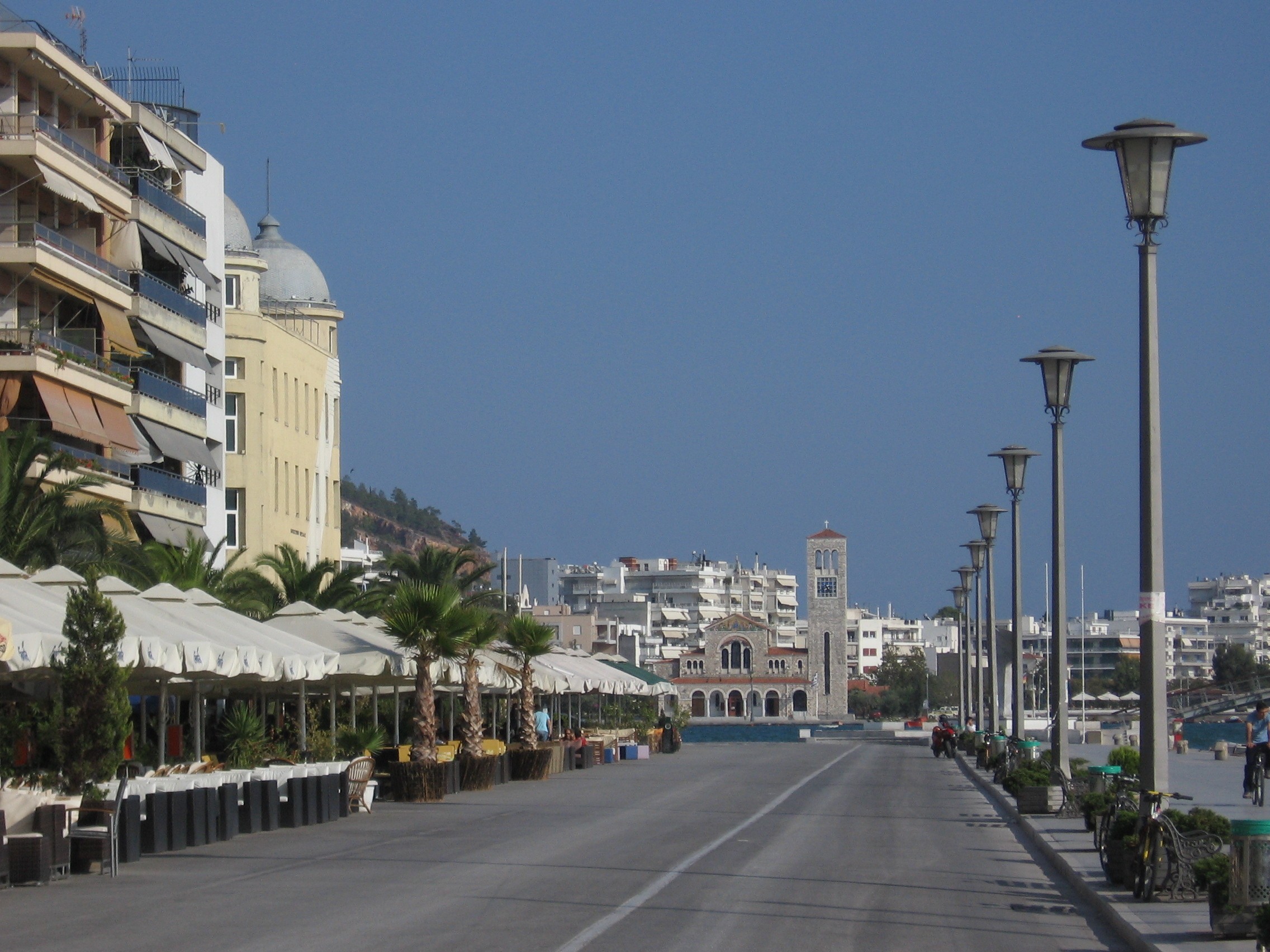
The promenade

== International relations ==
The city of Volos has always had a major role in the financial, economic, commercial and administrative matters of the region of Thessaly and Central Greece, due to the strategic position of the city's port, unique between Athens and Thessaloniki.

=== International consulates ===
Several European countries have established consulates in Volos including:

- Belgium
- Denmark
- France
- Germany
- Italy
- Netherlands

=== Twin towns – sister cities ===
Volos is twinned with:

- Antofagasta, Chile
- (Georgia (country)) Batumi, Georgia
- Le Mans, France
- Pleven, Bulgaria
- Rostov-on-Don, Russia
- Smederevo, Serbia
- Sochi, Russia
- Dunavarsány, Hungary

== Culture ==
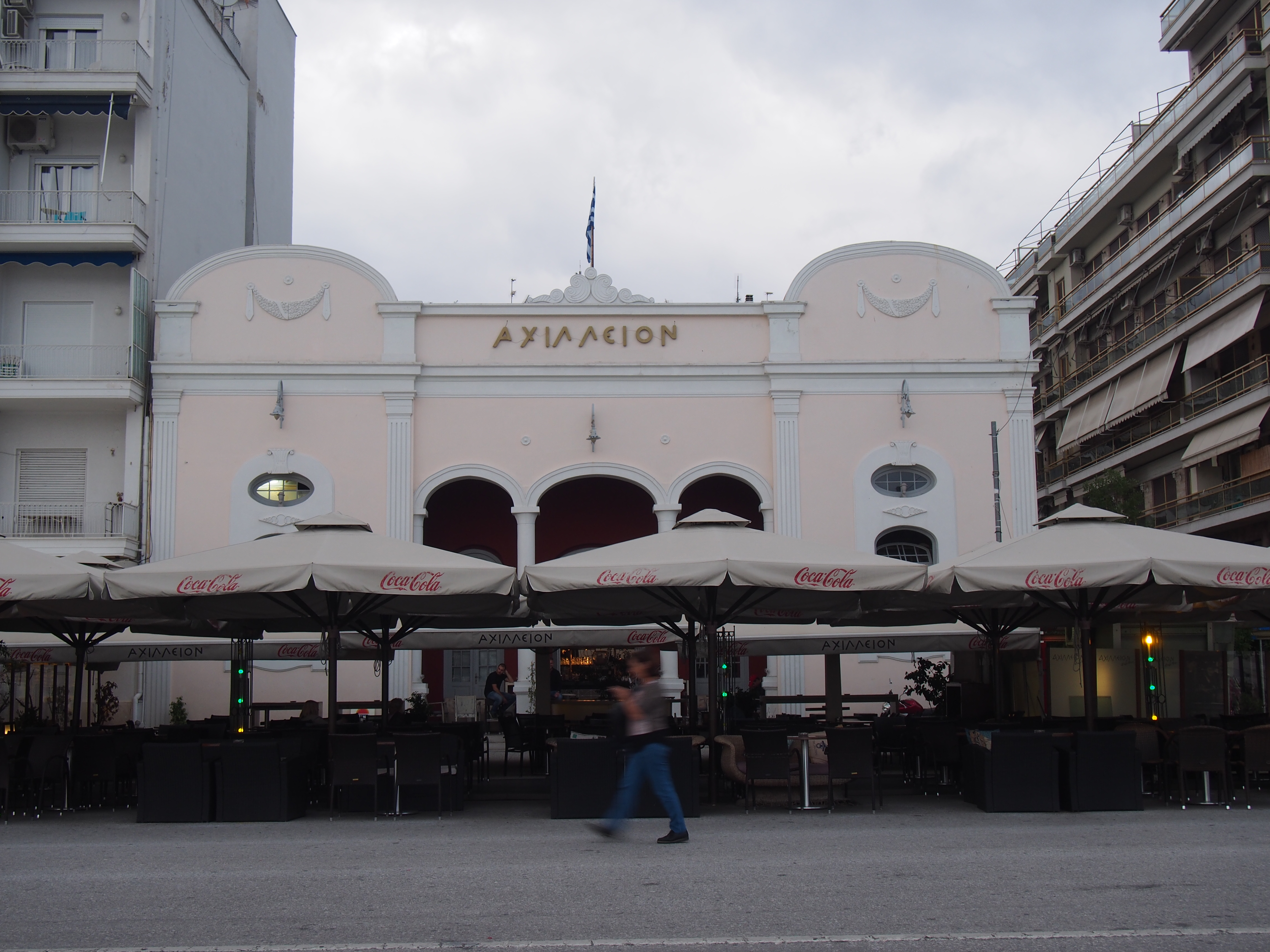
Cine Achilleion on the promenade

The wider region of Volos is a place rich with history, finding the first signals of culture in the Neolithic period. In the villages of Sesklo and Dimini, the first traces of Neolithic culture in Europe have been discovered.

Moreover, close by Volos, there are the ancient Dimitrias, a town built by Dimitrios Poliorkitis in 294-2 AC. Today, the ancient theatre of Dimitrias remains preserved. Also present are the archaeological areas of Goritsa hill, archaeological findings dating from the early Christian period in Nea Anchialos, and the wall of Volos's old castle, which is open to visitors.

Volos consists of a city with diverse Greek trades, as its industrial development encouraged many people to move to the city. The city's industrial and financial evolution also gradually resulted in cultural and social evolution, too; in 1894, Volos acquired its Municipal Theater and later its Gymnastics Club. In 1908, Volos became home to the first Labour Union in Greece.

After 1922, following the Asia Minor Catastrophe, Volos received a large number of people from the destroyed regions. This coexistence with the locals deeply influenced the culture of the city, leaving a mark still visible in the food, music, sports, entertainment and social life of the city today.

In modern times, there are museums and galleries to be visited throughout the city, but also in the wider region. Above all, Volos forms one of the most attractive and tourist-friendly cities in Greece because of its physical setting, combining the Pagasetic Gulf with Mount Pelion.

Volos was a candidate city for the European Capital of Culture, 2021.

=== Museums and galleries ===
- Archaeological Museum of Volos
- Volos Natural History Museum
- Modern History Museum of Volos City
- Giorgio de Chirico Art Centre
- Thessaly Railway Museum, Railway Station of Volos
- The Rooftile and Brickworks Museum N. & S. Tsalapatas, National Museum of Industrial History
- Entomological Museum of Volos
- Theofilos Museum, Anakasia (works of the artist Theofilos Hatzimikhail)

=== Cuisine ===
One of the main characteristics and most widely known specialities of Volos is its traditional drink, tsipouro, and the seafood that is served accompanying the drink.

Local specialities include:

- Boubari
- Spetzofai
- Melachrini (dessert)
- Spoon sweets
- Tsipouro (drink)

=== Sports ===
Volos, taking advantage of its physical setting by the sea, has a significant presence in Greek sporting history in the areas of rowing and sailing. The city also has two covered and one open sporting swimming pools, with a long history in swimming and water polo. Additionally, Volos has clubs and facilities in several sports, including football, basketball, volleyball, tennis and horseriding. The most popular clubs, with significant contributions to the sporting and cultural history of the city and significant successes in football, are Olympiacos Volos and Niki Volos. The main clubs of Volos are shown below :

Sport clubs based in Volos
Club	Founded	Sports	Achievements
Niki Volos	1924	Football, Basketball and other sports	Presence in A Ethniki football
N.C. Volos-Argonauts	1932	Water Polo	Presence in A1 Ethniki women
Olympiacos Volos	1937	Football, Basketball and other sports	Europa League participant, earlier presence in A Ethniki football, panhellenic title in women basketball
Hippotis equestrian club	2002	Horse riding	Presence in National competitions
Volos 2004	2004	Football	Presence in A Ethniki women
Volos F.C.	2017	Football	Presence in A Ethniki football

With its sporting traditions, Volos was one of the five cities that played host to the 2004 Summer Olympics.

Since 2004, Volos's facilities have hosted significant sports events, such as the 27th European Championship of Artistic Gymnastics in 2006, the FIBA European Youth Championship (2015), when Greece won the gold medal, and the Finals of Greek Football Cup, in 2007 and 2017.

== Transport ==
All land transport reaches Volos, while the International Airport of Central Greece in Nea Anchialos links the city to international destinations, and the Port of Volos provides links to the islands, mostly the Sporades, as well as to some destinations in Pilio.

=== Motorways ===
Volos is linked through Greece's E75 Highway Axis (most often known as PATHE) with Northern and Southern Greece. Beyond this, the Axis E65 will be the gateway to Western Greece and the port of Igoumenitsa, through the plains of inner Thessaly, when this part of the E65 link is completed.

=== Airport ===
The city of Volos, along with the rest of Central Greece, is linked to the rest of Greece and Europe by the Nea Anchialos National Airport. The airport has the second longest commercial runway in Greece after Eleftherios Venizelos.

Volos is the first city in Europe to feature Seaplane Services through Argo Airways, which is based in Volos. The seaplanes connect Volos with Skiathos, Skopelos, Allonisos, Athens and Thessaloniki.

=== Railway ===
Today, the city is served by direct lines to the rest of Greece, and the railway complex houses facilities for train maintenance. Volos is directly linked with Athens once per day, with Thessaloniki twice per day, and with Larissa 15 times a day. In the past, Volos was served by railway lines of three different gauges, the metre gauge line of Thessaly Railways to Kalampaka, the standard gauge line to Larissa and the 600 mm (1 ft 11 5/8 in) gauge line to Pelion. Remnants of triple gauge lines still exist near the station. Currently, the Pelion railway line operates for tourist reasons every Saturday, Sunday and public holiday from mid-April to the end of October. The train runs every day during July and August.

== Notable people ==
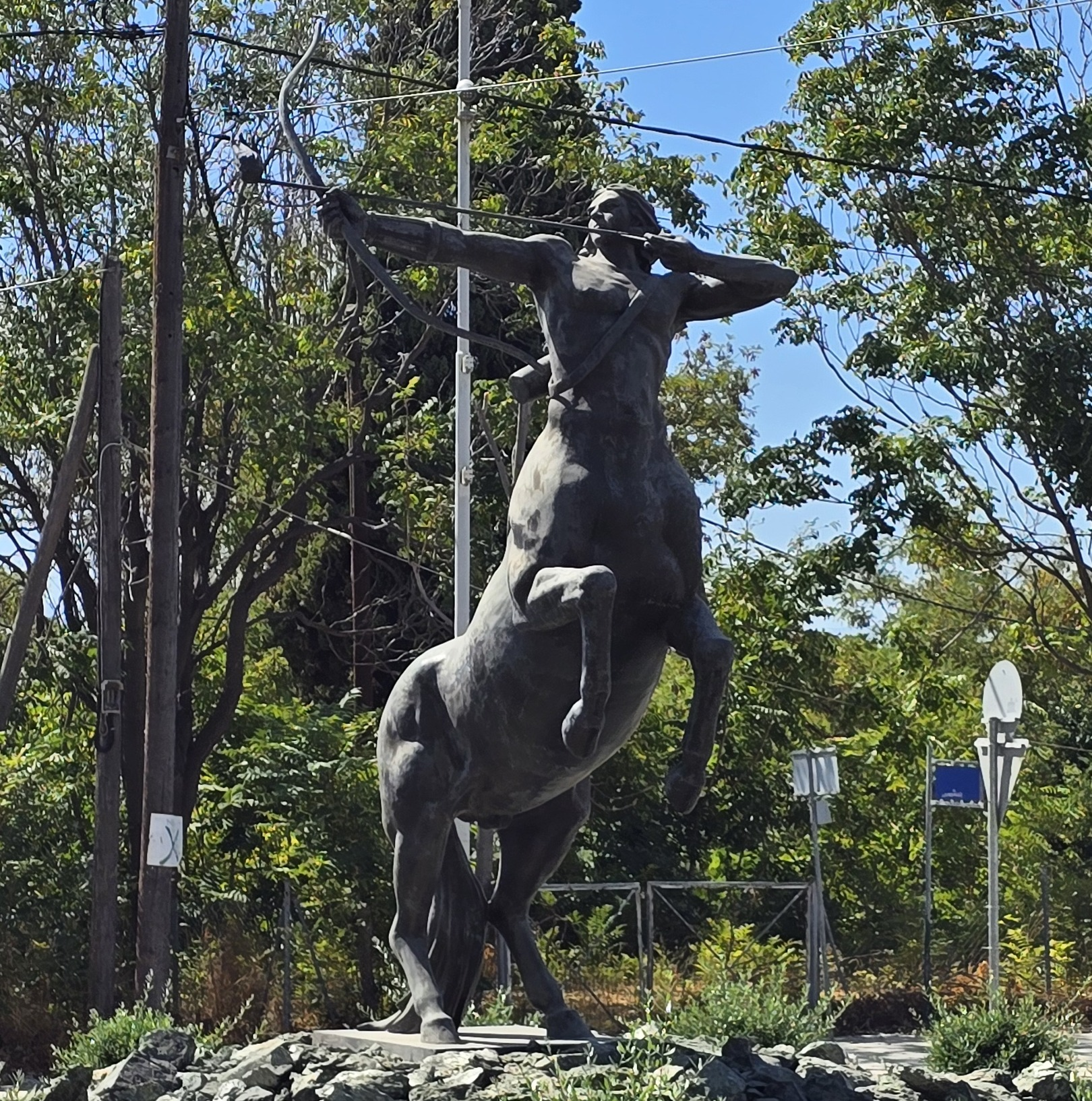
Statue of Chiron in Volos.

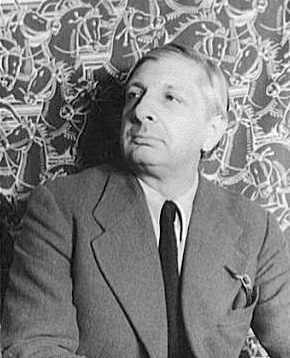
Giorgio de Chirico (1888–1978) was born in Volos.

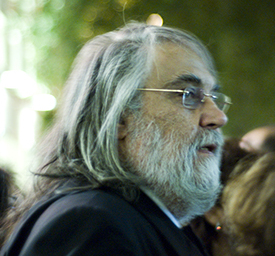
Vangelis Papathanasiou (Vangelis).

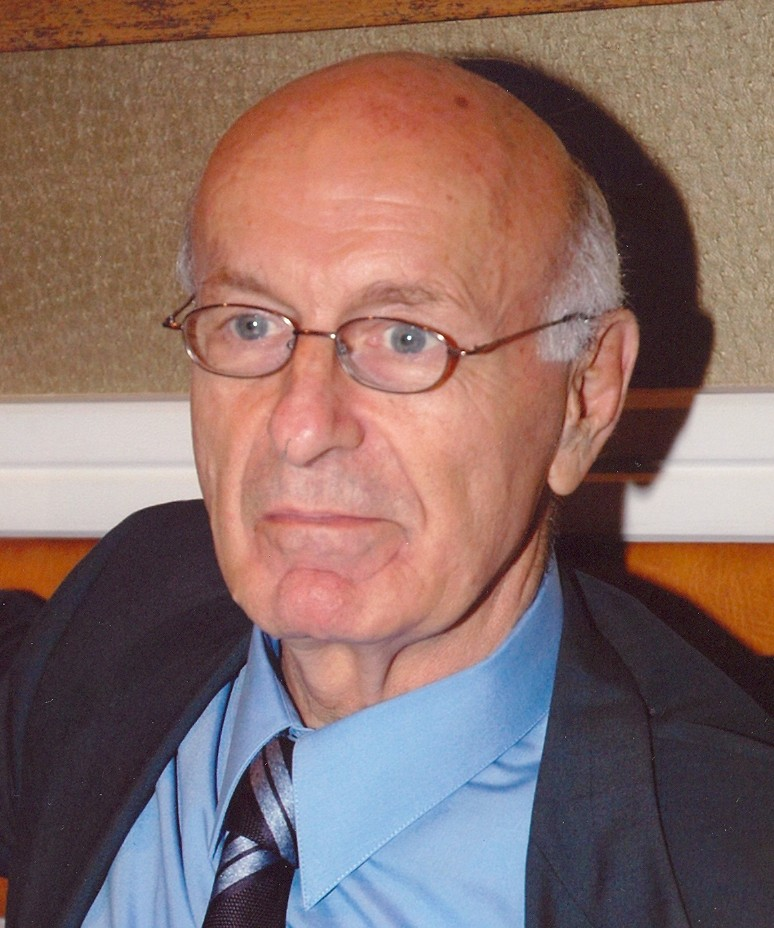
Dimitrios Trichopoulos

=== Mythology ===
- Iason, mythological hero
- Peleus, mythological hero
- Chiron, centaur

=== Modern ===
- Giorgio de Chirico, painter (1888–1978)
- Vangelis, composer (1943–2022)
- John Argyris, pioneer in engineering, Professor of Imperial College London and University of Stuttgart (1913–2004)
- Fotis Kouvelis, politician, leader of the Democratic Left
- Dimitrios Trichopoulos, medical doctor, Professor of Harvard School of Public Health
- Georgios Kartalis, politician (1908–1957)
- Yorgos Foudoulis, musician and composer (1964)
- Moshe Pesach, rabbi of Volos and Chief Rabbi of Greece
- Lavrentis Machairitsas, musician and songwriter (1956-2019)
- Artemis Alexiadou, linguist (1969)
- Apostolia Zoi, singer (1980)

=== Athletes ===
- Vasileios Polymeros, rower, olympic medalist (1976)
- Nikolaos Skiathitis, rower, olympic medalist (1981)
- Olga Vasdeki, triple jumper (1973)
- Spyridon Vasdekis, long jumper (1970)
- Paraskevi Tsiamita, triple, long jumper (1972)
- Nikos Boudouris, basketball player (1971)
- Panagiotis Liadelis, basketball player (1974)
- Athanasios Kostoulas, football player (1976)
- Efthalia Koutroumanidou, beach volleyball player (1982)
- Evanthia Makrygianni, synchronized swimmer (1986)
- Christos Volikakis, track cyclist (1988)
- Adam Tzanetopoulos, football player (1995)

== See also ==
- Thessaly
- Magnesia
- Pelion
- Sporades
- University of Thessaly
