= James Bynon =

British linguist

- Born: 30 August 1925
- Died: 23 July 2017 (aged 91)
- Education: Sorbonne University (PhD)
- Spouse: Theodora Bynon
- Scientific career
- Thesis: Recherches sur le Vocabulaire du Tissage en Afrique du Nord (1963)
- Doctoral advisor: Lionel Galand

James Francis Gordon Bynon (Baynham) (1925 - 2017) was a British linguist and Lecturer in Arabic and Berber at SOAS, London. He is known for his works on Berber languages and cultures.

== Books ==
- Recherches sur le Vocabulaire du Tissage en Afrique du Nord, 2005
- James and Theodora Bynon (eds.), Hamito-Semitica, London 1975
