= Sabine Iatridou =

American linguist

- Born: Thessaloniki, Greece

Academic background
- Education: University of Hawaii at Manoa (MA); Massachusetts Institute of Technology (PhD)
- Thesis: Topics in conditionals (1991)
- Doctoral advisor: Noam Chomsky

Academic work
- Discipline: Linguist
- Sub-discipline: Syntax, semantics

Sabine Iatridou is a linguist whose research investigates the syntax‐semantics interface. Her research has helped to delineate theories of tense and modality.

== Academic career ==
Iatridou was born in Thessaloniki. She spent her childhood in the Netherlands, and then returned to Greece to finish high school and attend college. She earned a DDS in 1982, an MA in Anthropology in 1986 from the University of Hawaii at Manoa, and a PhD in Linguistics from the Massachusetts Institute of Technology (MIT) in 1991. Under the supervision of Noam Chomsky, she explored the topic of conditionals in her dissertation.

Upon receiving her PhD, Iatridou worked as an assistant professor of linguistics at the University of Pennsylvania before returning to MIT to take up a position as Professor. She served as director of the MIT Linguistics PhD program for many years. In 2021, she was named the David W. Skinner Professor of Linguistics at MIT.

Iatridou has chaired a number of dissertations on topics in theoretical linguistics. She has explored the semantic and syntactic structures in a range of indigenous languages, including National Science Foundation-sponsored work on Mebengokre, an under-described language from the Je language family that is spoken in the eastern Amazon region of Brazil. Additionally, she has examined the syntax-semantics interface of relative clauses in the Uto-Aztecan languages of Hiaki (Yaqui) and O'odham (Papago).

== Awards ==
In 1994 and 1997 Iatridou received the National Science Foundation's Young Investigator Award.

In 2016, Iatridou was inducted as a Fellow of the Linguistic Society of America.

In 2016, The University of Crete's Department of Philology awarded an honorary doctorate to Iatridou.

In 2020, she was awarded a Guggenheim Fellowship for the field of study of linguistics.

== Key publications ==
- Sabine Iatridou. 1990. "About agr (p)," Linguistic Inquiry.
- Sabine Iatridou. 2000. "The grammatical ingredients of counterfactuality," Linguistic Inquiry.
- Sabine Iatridou, Elena Anagnostopoulou, and Roumyana Izvorski. 2003. "Observations about the form and meaning of the Perfect."Perfect Explorations.
- Kai von Fintel and Sabine Iatridou. 2008. "How to Say Ought in Foreign: The Composition of Weak Necessity Modals," Time and modality.
- "Our 'even'- Presentation at Universität Göttingen", September 17, 2014.
