= Andrew Carstairs-McCarthy =

Linguist

- Born: 27 August 1945 (age 81)
- Education: University of Oxford (BA Hons); School of Oriental and African Studies (PhD)
- Known for: works on English morphology
- Scientific career
- Fields: Morphology, Word formation
- Workplaces: University of Canterbury
- Thesis: Constraints on allomorphy in inflexion (1981)
- Doctoral advisor: Theodora Bynon, Geoffrey C. Horrocks
- Other academic advisors: Paul Kiparsky, Dick Hudson

Andrew Carstairs-McCarthy (born 27 August 1945) is a linguist and Emeritus Professor of Linguistics at the University of Canterbury (Christchurch, New Zealand). He is known for his expertise on morphology and word formation.

== Books ==
- Allomorphy in Inflexion. London: Croom Helm. 271pp. 1987. ISBN 0709934831 (With Andrew Carstairs as the named author.) Abingdon, Oxon: Routledge, 2013. ISBN 9780415825047, ISBN 9780203694473. (With Andrew Carstairs-McCarthy as the named author.)
- Current Morphology. London: Routledge. 289pp. 1992. ISBN 0415071186, ISBN 0415009987. 2002. ISBN 9781138868410.
- The Origins of Complex Language: An inquiry into the evolutionary beginnings of sentences, syllables and truth. Oxford: Oxford University Press. 260pp. 1999. ISBN 0198238215.
- An Introduction to English Morphology. Edinburgh: Edinburgh University Press. 151pp. 2002.
  - 2nd edition, 2018.
- The Evolution of Morphology. Oxford: Oxford University Press. 272pp. 2010. ISBN 9780199299782.
- Zeus, Jupiter, Jesus and the Catholic Church: What Good Is a God? Newcastle upon Tyne: Cambridge Scholars Publishing. 150pp. 2021. ISBN 9781527575516.
