= Archaeological Museum of Volos =

Museum in Volos, Greece

Coordinates: 39°21′07.45″N 22°57′40.38″E

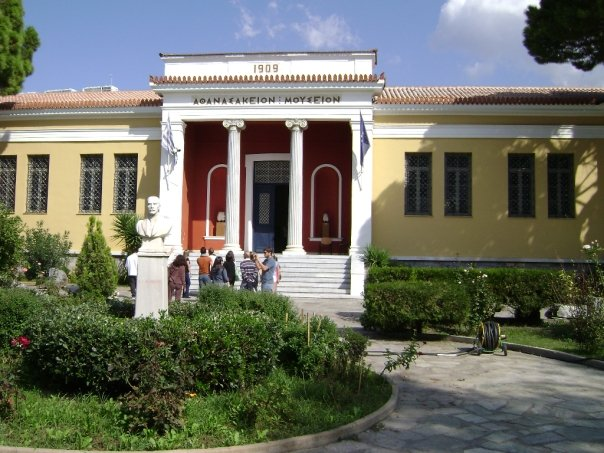
Archaeological Museum of Volos

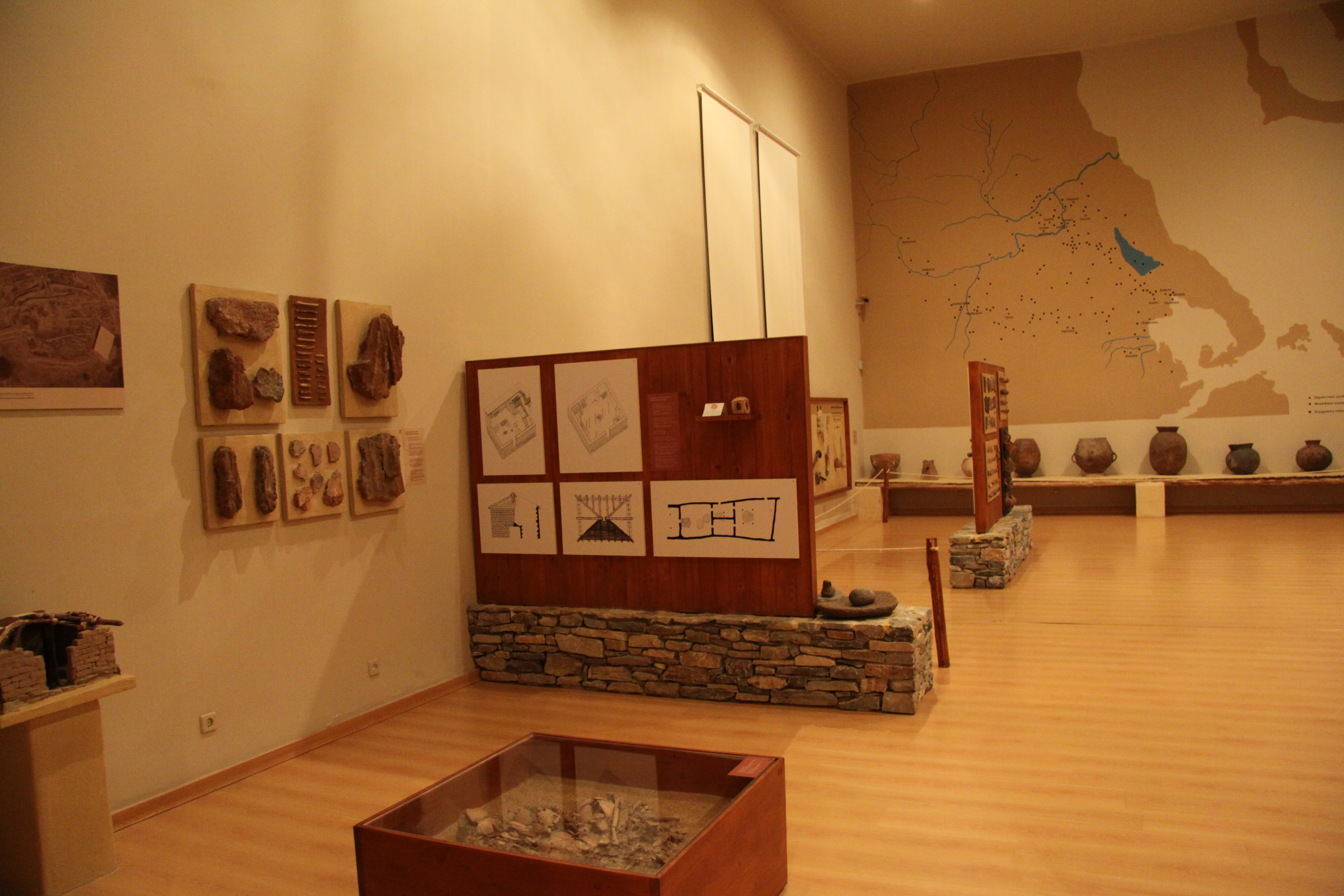
Exhibition of Neolithic items

The Archaeological Museum of Volos, also known as Athanasakeion Archaeological Museum of Volos, is an archaeology museum in Volos, Greece, that houses many exquisite finds from early 20th-century and modern archaeological excavations in Thessaly. One of the oldest museums of Greece, it was constructed in 1909 and is housed in a neoclassical building. Alexios Athanassakis, a merchant from Portaria, financed its construction and granted it to the Greek State after it was completed.

Exhibits on display include jewelry, household utensils and agricultural tools, originating from the Neolithic settlements of Dimini and Sesklo, as well as clay statuettes and a wide variety of items from the Geometric period, a time of great heroic events, such as the Argonaut Expedition and the Trojan War. There are also statues and uncommon jointed statuettes from the classical period, rare steles with relief work from the Hellenistic period whose colors are well-preserved, as well as reliefs from the early Christian and Byzantine periods. Other fascinating exhibits include tombs transported in their entirety from the archaeological sites where they were discovered, along with the human skeleton and the offerings placed around it.

Outside the museum there are reconstructions of the Neolithic houses at Dimini and Sesklo.

== See also ==
- List of museums in Greece
