= Artemis Alexiadou =

Greek professor and linguist (born 1969)

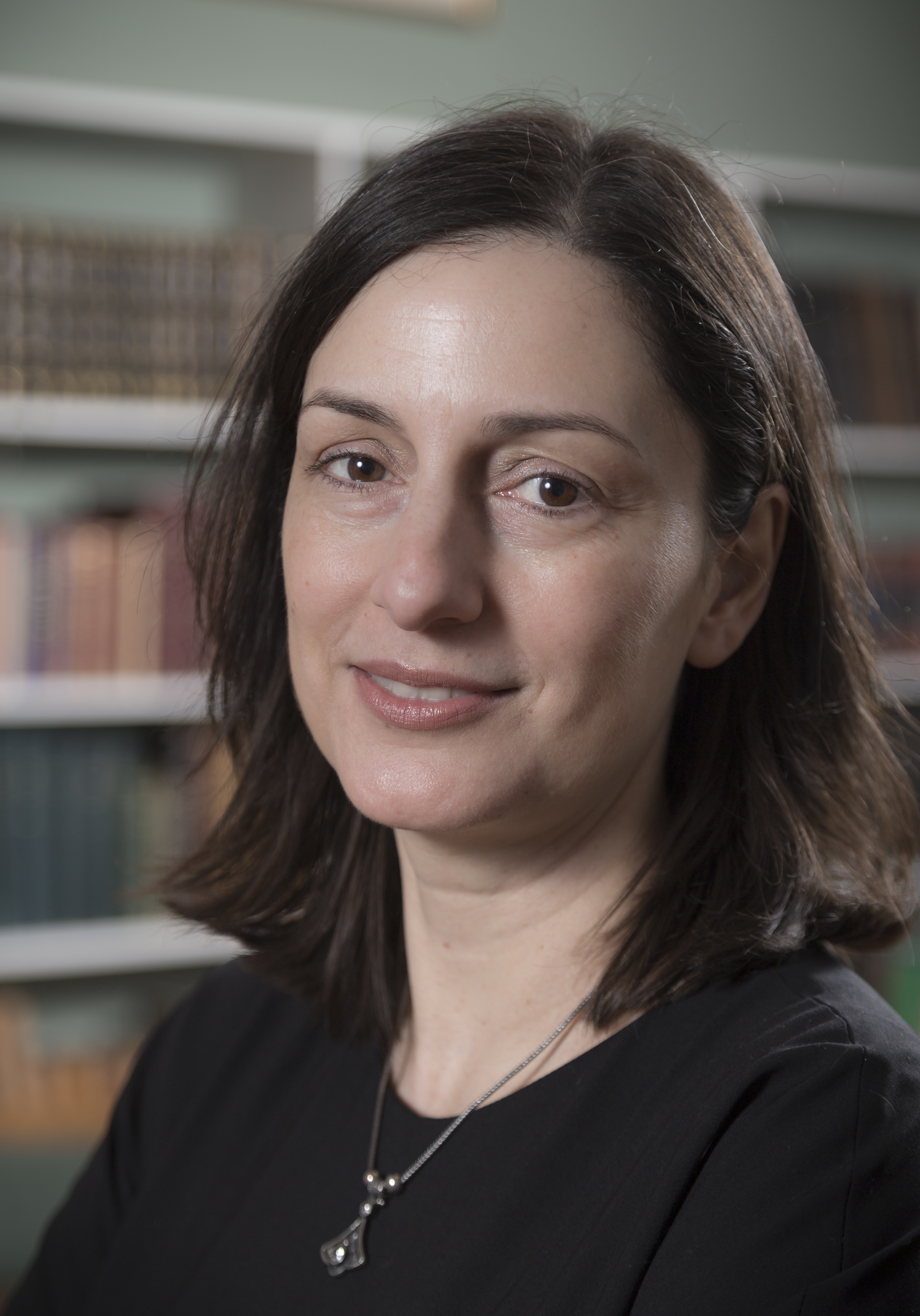
- Born: 13 February 1969 (age 57); Volos, Greece
- Occupation: linguist

Academic background
- Education: University of Potsdam

Academic work
- Institutions: Humboldt University of Berlin
- Main interests: Syntax, generative grammar, heritage language

Artemis Alexiadou (Άρτεμις Αλεξιάδου, born 13 February 1969 in Volos) is a Greek linguist active in syntax research working in Germany. She is professor of English linguistics at the Humboldt University of Berlin.

== Education ==
Alexiadou began her studies in Linguistics at the age of 17 at the National and Kapodistrian University of Athens. After graduating in 1990, Alexiadou undertook a master's degree at the University of Reading and then continued on to the Zentrum für Allgemeine Sprachwissenschaft in Berlin. In 1994 Alexiadou gained a PhD from the University of Potsdam and also passed her Habilitation there in 1999.

== Career ==
After gaining a habilitation, Alexiadou researched at MIT, Princeton University and the University of Pennsylvania on a Heisenberg fellowship and was guest professor in Tübingen and Potsdam. From 2002 until 2015 Alexiadou was Professor for theoretical and English linguistics and head of the Institute of Linguistics at the University of Stuttgart and also the project "Sonderforschungsbereich 732". Since 2015 Alexiadou has been professor for English linguistics at the Humboldt University of Berlin; in 2022 she became director of the Leibniz-Zentrum für Allgemeine Sprachwissenschaft.

Alexiadou is an important representative of generative grammar in Europe and was president of the association "Generative Linguistics in the Old World" (GLOW) from 2005 until 2009. Most notably, she has written multiple seminal works on several topics in syntax. Alexiadou is especially known for her work and expertise on the syntactic structure of the noun phrase, adverbs, voice and roots.

== Awards and honours ==
In 2014, she was awarded the Gottfried Wilhelm Leibniz Prize, and in the same year, she was elected a member of the German National Academy of Sciences Leopoldina. In 2016, the Norwegian University of Science and Technology awarded Alexiadou an honorary doctorate. She is a member of the Norwegian Academy of Science and Letters.

== Selected works ==
- Alexiadou, Artemis: Adverb placement: a case study in antisymmetric syntax. Amsterdam, 1997: John Benjamins. ISBN 978-1-55619-902-8
- Alexiadou, Artemis & T. Alan Hall (eds.): Studies in Universal Grammar and Typological Variation. Amsterdam, 1997: John Benjamins. ISBN 978-1-55619-232-6
- Alexiadou, Artemis & Chris Wilder (eds.): Possessors, Predicates and Movement in the DP. Amsterdam, 1998: John Benjamins. ISBN 978-90-272-2743-0
- Alexiadou, Artemis, Geoffrey C. Horrocks & Melita Stavrou (eds.): Studies in Greek Syntax. Natural Language and Linguistic Theory Series. Dordrecht, 1999: Kluwer Academic Publishers.
- Alexiadou, Artemis, Paul Law, André Meinunger & Chris Wilder (eds.): The Syntax of Relative Clauses. Amsterdam, 2000: John Benjamins. ISBN 978-1-55619-916-5
- Alexiadou, Artemis: Functional Structure in Nominals: Nominalization, and Ergativity. Amsterdam, 2001: John Benjamins. ISBN 978-1-58811-055-8
- Alexiadou, Artemis, Elena Anagnostopoulou, Sjef Barbiers & Hans-Martin Gärtner (eds.): Dimensions of Movement: from Features to Remnants. Amsterdam, 2002: John Benjamins. ISBN 978-1-58811-185-2
- Alexiadou, Artemis (Hrsg.): Theoretical Approaches to Universals. Amsterdam, 2002: John Benjamins. ISBN 978-1-58811-191-3
- Alexiadou, Artemis, Monika Rathert & Arnim von Stechow (eds.): Perfect Explorations. Berlin, 2003: Mouton de Gruyter. ISBN 978-3-11-017229-4
- Alexiadou, Artemis, Elena Anagnostopoulou & Martin Everaert (eds.): The Unaccusativity Puzzle. Oxford, 2004: Oxford University Press. ISBN 978-0-19-925765-2
- Alexiadou, Artemis (ed.): Studies in the Morpho-syntax of Greek. Cambridge, 2007: Cambridge Scholars Publishing. ISBN 978-1-84718-384-2
- Alexiadou, Artemis, Liliane Haegeman & Melita Stavrou: Noun Phrase in the Generative Perspective. Berlin, 2007: Mouton de Gruyter. ISBN 978-3-11-017685-8
- Alexiadou, Artemis, Jorge Hankamer, Justin Nugger, Thomas McFadden & Florian Schäfer: Advances in Comparative Germanic Syntax. Amsterdam 2009: John Benjamins. ISBN 978-90-272-5524-2
- Alexiadou, Artemis & Monika Rathert (eds.): The Syntax of Nominalizations across Languages and Frameworks. Berlin, 2010: Mouton de Gruyter. ISBN 978-3-11-022653-9
- Rathert, Monika & Artemis Alexiadou (eds.): The Semantics of Nominalizations across Languages and Frameworks. Berlin, 2010: Mouton de Gruyter. ISBN 978-3-11-173977-9
- Alexiadou, Artemis, Tibor Kiss & Gereon Müller (eds.): Local Modelling of Non-Local Dependencies in Syntax. Berlin, 2012: Mouton de Gruyter. ISBN 978-3-11-029471-2
- Alexiadou, Artemis & Florian Schäfer (eds.): Non-Canonical Passives. Amsterdam, 2013: John Benjamins. ISBN 978-90-272-5588-4
- Alexiadou, Artemis, Hagit Borer & Florian Schäfer (eds.): The Syntax of Roots and the Roots of Syntax. Oxford, 2014: Oxford University Press. ISBN 978-0-19-966526-6
- Alexiadou, Artemis: Multiple Determiners and the Structure of DPs. Amsterdam, 2014: John Benjamins. ISBN 978-90-272-5594-5
- Alexiadou, Artemis & Tibor Kiss (eds.): Syntax – Theory and Analysis. 3 volumes. Berlin, 2015: Mouton de Gruyter. Band 1 ISBN 978-3-11-037741-5, Band 2 ISBN 978-3-11-035866-7, Band 3 ISBN 978-3-11-036369-2
- Alexiadou, Artemis, Elena Anagnostopoulou, & Florian Schäfer: External Arguments in Transitivity Alternations. Oxford, 2015: Oxford University Press. ISBN 978-0-19-957194-9
