= Dorward =

Dorward is a surname. Notable people by that name include:

- Arthur Dorward (British Army officer) (1848–1934)
- Arthur Dorward (1925–2015), Scottish international rugby union player
- David Dorward (born 1952), Canadian politician
- James Dorward (born 1841), Scottish mariner
- Nigel Dorward (born 1966), Zimbabwean cricketer
- Tom Dorward (1916–1941), Scottish sportsman
