= Willy Tiedjen =

German painter (1881–1950)

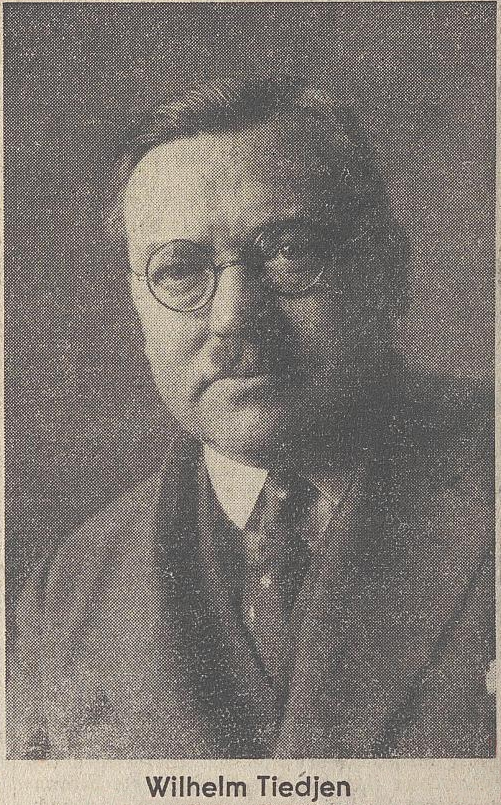
- Born: January 22, 1881; Hamburg, German Empire
- Died: January 16, 1950 (aged 68); Munich, West Germany
- Education: Academy of Fine Arts, Munich
- Known for: Painting, drawing
- Notable work: Entenküken (1907), Tonbilder (1915)
- Movement: Munich School, Impressionism
- Spouse: Franziska Emilie "Fanny" Bieber (m. 1909)
- Patrons: Galerie Heinemann, Munich Kunstverein

Signature
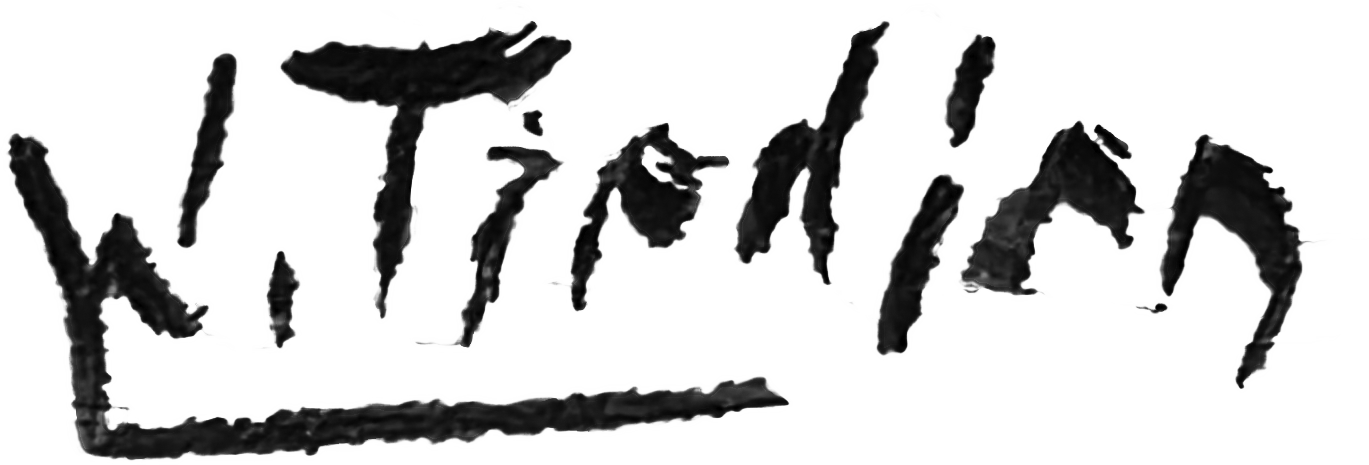

Wilhelm Emil Martin Tiedjen (22 January 1881 – 16 January 1950), known as Willy Tiedjen, was a German painter associated with the late Munich School and Impressionism. A pupil of Heinrich von Zügel at the Academy of Fine Arts, Munich, he worked across animal subjects, rural genre, and maritime and harbor scenes, as well as portraits and still lifes. Early notices credit Alfred Lichtwark with encouraging his talent and arranging a scholarship that enabled his Munich studies. Active in Munich’s exhibition life, he showed at the Glaspalast and in association venues in Munich, Berlin, Aachen and elsewhere. He maintained a private teaching studio and, from 1906, ran a school for landscape and animal painting that admitted women as well as men. In the late 1930s he exhibited at the state Große Deutsche Kunstausstellung in Munich, where two paintings were purchased for Adolf Hitler’s collection. His work circulated internationally by the 1920s.

== Early life and education ==
Born in Hamburg in 1881 to Heinrich and Berta (née Wilkens), Tiedjen's full name was Wilhelm Emil Martin Tiedjen; variant spellings Tiedgen and Tietjen appear in auction catalogues and art references. He grew up in a "modest artisan household... constantly sketching animals, harbor scenes, and rural life from a young age."

Tiedjen initially trained and worked as a penniless apprentice painter. In his spare time he sketched animals at the zoo, where his talent was noticed by Alfred Lichtwark. Lichtwark encouraged him and arranged a scholarship that enabled Tiedjen to study with Heinrich von Zügel, launching his professional career.

Academy enrollment records for 8 April 1902 list him as Emil M. Wilhelm Tiedjen, age 21, born in Hamburg, of evangelical-Lutheran faith. The entry notes his father's occupation as painter and his mother as innkeeper. He entered the Academy in the animal painting class (Malschule Zügel) under Zügel.

== Career ==
=== Exhibitions and patronage ===
Tiedjen exhibited regularly in Munich and Berlin from the first decade of the twentieth century, including appearances in the Glaspalast and association shows in Munich, Aachen, Leipzig and Berlin.

In the late 1930s he participated in the state-sponsored Große Deutsche Kunstausstellung (GDK) in Munich, where two of his paintings — Eisgang im Hamburger Hafen (1938) and Abend auf der Heide (1938/1940) — were purchased by Adolf Hitler.

During the First World War, Tiedjen’s maritime and harbor paintings were displayed in officers’ facilities at the German Army's Great General Headquarters, where they were shown alongside works by leading marine painters such as Hans Bohrdt, Carl Becker, and Hugo Schnars-Alquist.

=== Style and subjects ===
Reviewers consistently linked Tiedjen to the Zügel circle of animal painters while noting his turn toward broader landscape and marine motifs. In 1910 Der Cicerone called him a “capable painter-anatomist” with a “keen eye,” and observed that after a trip to the Netherlands he moved “with much success” beyond pure animal painting into landscape. Period notices describe “rich, luscious colors,” characteristic motifs of “ducks and harbors,” and a pervasive “sea-damp atmosphere.” Critics singled out his lion and tiger studies for their vitality and his harbor scenes for atmospheric handling of light and weather.

=== Teaching and studio ===
In addition to his exhibition activity, Tiedjen was also active as a teacher. In 1906 he established his own school for landscape and animal painting in Wildenroth near Grafrath, Bavaria. The school explicitly welcomed both women and men as pupils, at a time when many German art academies still limited or denied women admission; contemporary notices characterize it as a private studio school outside the state academies.

He and his wife, the painter Fanny Tiedjen-Bieber, are listed together at Kurfürstenstraße 8 in the 1926 Handbuch des Kunstmarkts, where she is recorded as a member of the Royal Association of Munich Women Artists.

=== Military service and wartime displays ===
In 1914, at the outbreak of World War I, Willy Tiedjen contributed to relief efforts by donating an oil painting entitled Deutsches Kriegsschiff ("German Warship") to the Deutsches Red Cross. The work was exhibited at the Kunstsalon Littauer in Munich, with the proceeds benefiting the organization.

In May 1916, Tiedjen was among several artists, including Carl Becker, Hans Bohrdt, and Hugo Schnars-Alquist, whose maritime works were exhibited in the officers’ dining hall at the German Army's Great General Headquarters. The event was noted as an “interesting artistic occasion,” underscoring Tiedjen’s recognition among prominent marine painters during the war.

In February 1918, a new collection of marine paintings was exhibited in the officers’ mess at the German Army's Great General Headquarters. The display included works by leading maritime artists such as Hans Bohrdt, Carl Becker, Hugo Schnars-Alquist, and Tiedjen.

During the First World War, Tiedjen was conscripted into the German Army. Bavarian World War I personnel rosters record his military service in the 2nd Bavarian Infantry Regiment (Munich), 1st Replacement Battalion.

== Personal life ==
On 19 June 1909, Willy Tiedjen married Franziska Emilie “Fanny” Bieber in Munich. The couple appeared together in contemporary exhibition contexts in 1909, when both exhibited in association shows.

== Later career ==
Later in World War I, several of Tiedjen's animal and genre scenes were circulated as Feldpost postcards. These included humorous works such as Gefangenentransport ("Prisoner transport"), depicting a German soldier carrying two geese, which reflected both his reputation as an "Entenmaler" and the lighter side of wartime imagery.

By the 1920s, Tiedjen had achieved international recognition. In 1927, several of his paintings were purchased directly from the artist by the California hotelier and collector William A. Matern; after Matern's death, many were donated to the Orthopedic Hospital in Los Angeles.

In the late 1930s, Willy Tiedjen was among the Munich artists associated with Rosenheim art circles, mentioned alongside painters such as Walter Geffcken, Hans von Hayek, Erich Kubierschky, and Edmund Steppes.

On 22 January 1936, Salzburger Volksblatt reported that Tiedjen celebrated his 50th birthday in Munich. A solo exhibition was planned by the Munich Artists’ Association in his honor.

A 1941 Hamburger Tageblatt article noted Tiedjen's 60th birthday. Tiedjen was lauded by regime-aligned press as an “old follower of the Führer,” asserting he had lived in Munich for nearly forty years. The article claimed he had served with the Freikorps von Epp in the “liberation” of Munich and, during Adolf Hitler’s early Kampfzeit, had gifted a painting Munich Duck Wedding Festival (Münchener Entenhochzeitsfest) to Hitler, and in return receiving a generously appointed artist’s studio. The same article lamented that he was disparagingly called an “Entenmaler” (“duck painter”), arguing that such a label failed to capture his work in German landscapes.

During the Second World War, Tiedjen lost his Schwabing studio in Munich, forcing him to relocate part of his practice to Garmisch-Partenkirchen.

== Death and burial ==
Tiedjen died in Munich in 1950 at the age of 68. He was buried in the Waldfriedhof (Forest Cemetery) in Munich, in the section reserved for artists' graves.

== Additional works recorded at the Munich Central Collecting Point ==
Following the end of the Second World War, the Monuments, Fine Arts and Archives Service of the Allied forces established the Munich Central Collecting Point (MCCP) to process artworks that had been looted, confiscated, or otherwise displaced between 1933 and 1945. Property cards created at the MCCP record several works by Willy Tiedjen that entered the facility between 1945 and 1946. These files document provenance details such as earlier exhibitions at the Haus der Deutschen Kunst, acquisitions by the Reich Chancellery, and later transfers to the Bavarian Minister-President or restitution to private owners.

=== German Lost Art Foundation ===
The German Lost Art Foundation registered a drawing by Tiedjen titled Oktoberfest. The entry forms part of a search request concerning the collection of the Munich art dealer Ludwig Heymann and his wife Therese (née Abeles), whose stock was subject to confiscation in the Nazi period.

== Critical reception ==
Tiedjen's work drew the attention of contemporary critics, who praised both his precision of observation and his developing range as a painter. His reputation as a pupil of Heinrich von Zügel placed him within the strong tradition of German animal painting, but reviewers also noted his ability to expand beyond it.

In 1910, the art journal Der Cicerone remarked that "the Zügel pupil W. Tiedjen is a capable painter-anatomist, who knows how to see with a keen eye." The review continued that, following a trip to the Netherlands, Tiedjen had "with much success moved away from pure animal painting to also undertake forays into landscape."

In May 1910, the Leipziger Tageblatt und Handelszeitung reviewed the Leipzig Secession exhibition and noted that Tiedjen stood out among the younger artists, exhibiting a North German village landscape and a canal scene from Holland that showed "a secure sense of atmosphere and tone" and marked him as "a painter still developing, yet already bearing the mark of artistic seriousness."

That same year, the General-Anzeiger der Stadt Mannheim praised Tiedjen as a "master student of Zügel" and noted his "secure hand" and "bold coloring" in paintings of pheasants, geese, and Tyrolean and Bavarian landscapes. The review also highlighted his developing portrait work, mentioning a likeness of the local district administrator.

In 1911, at the Munich Glass Palace (Glaspalast) exhibition, Tiedjen showed thirty-four animal paintings, the majority depicting subjects from the Hamburg Zoological Garden. A contemporary review praised him as "one of the very best animal painters," observing that he had advanced beyond the Zügel School to develop "a strong personal individuality." His works were described as "refreshing in the truest sense of the word," combining flawless painterly technique with an unspoiled feeling for nature. The critic singled out his lion studies as being of such high quality that they "belong to the very best that has been created in modern animal painting," while also commending his portrayals of tigers for their "dangerous elegance," monkeys for their "liveliness and truth to nature," and birds of prey for their lifelike poses.

In 1928, the positive reviews continued in the Allgemeine Zeitung (Acht-Uhr-Abendblatt) described his paintings as executed "in rich, luscious colors," highlighting his characteristic motifs of "ducks and harbors" and noting the "sea-damp atmosphere" that enveloped his work.

In 1931, on the occasion of his 50th birthday, Tiedjen held a solo exhibition at Galerie Jordan in Munich. A contemporary review highlighted his depictions of southern German landscapes, as well as harbor scenes such as Hamburg and Trieste, and praised his use of color, light, and atmosphere, describing his work as well suited to interior settings.

== Known addresses ==
Exhibition catalogues record the following addresses for Willy Tiedjen. These may indicate his residence or working studio at the time of the exhibition.

- 1906 — Fettstraße 3, Hamburg

Listed in Münchener Jahres-Ausstellung 1906 im Königlichen Glaspalast, official catalogue.

- 1908 — Schellingstraße 70, Munich

Listed in Münchener Jahres-Ausstellung 1908 im Königlichen Glaspalast, official catalogue.

- 1911 — Kurfürstenstraße 40, Munich

Listed in Jubiläumsausstellung der Münchener Künstlergenossenschaft 1911 (Glaspalast), official catalogue.

- 1913 — Kurfürstenstraße 40, Munich

Listed in Illustrierter Katalog der XI. Internationalen Kunstausstellung im Königlichen Glaspalast zu München, official catalogue.

== Legacy ==
Tiedjen’s work is documented in postwar provenance records and continues to circulate in private collections and the art market. Contemporary press coverage, including a 1936 feature in the Hamburger Nachrichten, provides period documentation of his subjects and reception.

== See also ==
- Heinrich von Zügel
- Glaspalast (Munich)
- Große Deutsche Kunstausstellung
- Impressionism
