= Pithie =

Pithie is a surname. Notable people with the surname include:

- Dean Pithie (born 1974), English boxer
- Laurence Pithie (born 2002) New Zealand cyclist
- Les Pithie (1908–1980), New Zealand rower
- William Pithie (1859–unknown), Scottish mariner
