= Glenavon =

Glenavon may refer to:

- Glenavon F.C., a semi-professional football club in Northern Ireland
- Glenavon (1881), a merchant ship wrecked in 1898
- Glenavon, Saskatchewan, a Canadian village
- Glenavon Road, a tower block housing complex in Maryhill, Glasgow, Scotland
