= List of works by Willy Tiedjen =

Known works by German painter Willy Tiedjen (1881–1950) are documented in exhibition catalogues, sales catalogues, or contemporary publications. The following list includes paintings, etchings, and other works for which reliable sources provide a title, description, or record of exhibition or sale. Dates generally indicate the year in which a work was first recorded, which may differ from the year of its creation. The list is not exhaustive, but reflects all known works that have been verified through published references.

Image Title (German)	English translation	First recorded	Medium / dimensions	Activity (exhibition / sale / catalogue)
Enten am Teich	Ducks at a Pond	-	Oil on wood, 42 × 62 cm (signed lower right)	23–25 Sep 2004 – Auctioned at Auktionshaus Kaupp, Schloss Sulzburg, Herbst-Auction, Lot 277. “Pond with five ducks, garden fence in the background.” Sold for €1000.
Ostseestrand mit Ruderboot	Baltic Sea Beach with Rowing Boat	-	Oil on canvas, 39 × 60 cm (signed)	9 Oct 2021 – Offered at Kunst & Auktionshaus Ruef, Herbstauktion 567, Lot 97, limit €250; unsold.
Schäfer mit seiner Herde	Shepherd with his flock	-	Oil on canvas, 70 × 90 cm	Photographed in 1988/1989 and recorded in Bildindex der Kunst & Architektur. Neumeister Art Auctions, Inventory No. Lot 538, 14 June 1989
Jungvieh am Gatter in einem Birkenweg	Young cattle at a gate on a birch-lined path	-	Oil on canvas, 66 × 88 cm	Photographed in 1946 and recorded in Bildindex der Kunst & Architektur.
Hochseeschiffe im Hamburger Hafen	High-sea ships in the Port of Hamburg	-	Oil on pasteboard, 62 × 82 cm	Photographed in 1990 and recorded in Bildindex der Kunst & Architektur.
Die Stiefmutter (Henne mit Enten-Küken)	The Stepmother (Hen with Ducklings)	-	Oil on cardboard, 38.5 × 66 cm (signed lower left)	12 Dec 1990 – Auctioned at Neumeister Kunstauktionen, Munich, Auktion Nr. 259, Lot 734. Recorded in Bildindex der Kunst & Architektur.
Vier Enten im Sonnenlicht	Four Ducks in Sunlight	-	Oil on cardboard, 23.5 × 16.5 cm (signed lower right as “W. Tietjen”)	4 Nov 1994 – Auctioned at Auktionshaus Schopmann, Kunst- und Antiquitäten-Auktion, Lot 177. “Four white ducks on sunlit pond.” Listed for 1400 DM.
Im Hamburger Hafen	In the Port of Hamburg	-	Oil on canvas, dimensions unknown	7 Oct 2000 – Auctioned at Auktionshaus Hans Stahl, Hamburg, Lot 227. Industrial harbor scene with ships and tugboats. Listed for 1,100 DM.
Cattle Grazing in Landscape, Autumn	Cattle Grazing in Landscape, Autumn	-	Oil on canvas, 60 × 80 cm	25 Mar 1991 – Sold at Neumeister, Munich, Lot 1512, for DM 2,500 (approx. £1,329 / $2,272).
Sheep Outside Stable	Sheep Outside Stable	-	Oil on canvas, 55 × 75 cm	26 Mar 1987 – Sold at Neumeister, Munich, Lot 272, for DM 3,800 (approx. £1,822 / $2,977).
Schweres Fuhrwerk	Heavy Team (Wagon)	1905	Oil on canvas, dimensions unknown	1905 – Exhibited at the Württembergischer Kunstverein (Württemberg Art Association)
Enten am See	Ducks at a Lake	1905	Oil on wood, 38 × 56 cm (signed lower right, dated 05)	11–12 Oct 2002 – Auctioned at Kastern, Hannover, Auktion A101, Lot 1237. “Seven ducks are shown near and on the still water of a lakeshore.”
Schimmel im Wald	Horse in the Forest	1905	Oil on canvas, dimensions unknown	1905 – Listed in Berliner Kunst-Herold, Issue 18 (Stuttgart Württemberg Kunstverein sale notices).
Schottischer Schäferhund	Scottish Sheepdog	1906	Oil on canvas, dimensions unknown	1906 – Listed in Münchener Jahres-Ausstellung 1906 im Königlichen Glaspalast (Munich Annual Exhibition 1906, Glaspalast).
Hase	Hare	1906	Oil on canvas, dimensions unknown	1906 – Listed in ‘’Berliner Kunst-Herold’’, Issue 29 (1906).
Mutter und Sohn	Mother and Son	1906	Oil on canvas, dimensions unknown	1906 – Listed in ‘’Berliner Kunst-Herold’’, Issue 14 (1906).
Die Mühle	The Mill	1907	Pastel on cardboard, H. 60 cm × W. 80 cm (signed and dated 1907)	1912 – Listed in Kunstsalon v. Elsner & Spieckermann auction catalogue, Cologne, 1912, lot 167. Catalog description: Depicts a windmill standing on a gently rising shore, with low houses behind and a boat by the riverbank.; 1912 – Listed in Galerie Del Vecchio auction catalogue, Leipzig, 22 October 1912, lot 211. Catalog description: Depicts a windmill standing on a gently sloping shore, with low houses behind it and a small boat by the riverbank.
In Erwartung	In Expectation	1907	Oil on canvas, dimensions unknown	1907 – Listed in Berliner Kunst-Herold, Issue 31 (1907).
Vor dem Wirtshaus	In Front of the Inn	1907	Oil on canvas, dimensions unknown	1907 – Listed in Berliner Kunst-Herold, Issue 31 (1907).
Hühnerhof	Poultry/Chicken Yard	1907	Oil on canvas, dimensions unknown	1907 – Listed in ‘’Berliner Kunst-Herold’’, Issue 28 (1907), under new acquisitions at the Kunstverein München.
Entenküken	Ducklings	1907	Oil on canvas, dimensions unknown	1907 – Exhibited in Munich (Kunstchronik)
Im Garten	In the Garden	1907	Oil on canvas, dimensions unknown	1907 – Galerie Heinemann Catalogue
Heimkehr	Homecoming	1907	Oil on canvas, dimensions unknown	1907 – Galerie Heinemann Catalogue, Sold 250 DM
Im Hochsommer	In High Summer	1907	Oil on canvas, dimensions unknown	1907 – Galerie Heinemann Catalogue
Pfingstrosen	Peonies	1907	Oil on canvas, dimensions unknown	1907 – Galerie Heinemann Catalogue
Toter Fuchs	Dead Fox	1907	Oil on canvas, dimensions unknown	1907 – Galerie Heinemann Catalogue
Herbst an der Amper	Autumn on the Amper	1907	Oil on canvas, dimensions unknown	1907 – Galerie Heinemann Catalogue
Im Schatten	In the Shade	1907	Oil on canvas, dimensions unknown	1907 – Galerie Heinemann Catalogue
Heidschnuckenbock	Heidschnuck ram	1907	Oil on canvas, dimensions unknown	1907 – Galerie Heinemann Catalogue, Sold 700 DM
Blick ins Luhetal	View into the Luhe Valley	1907	Oil on canvas, dimensions unknown	1907 – Galerie Heinemann Catalogue
Bussard	Buzzard	1907	Oil on canvas, dimensions unknown	1907 – Galerie Heinemann Catalogue, Sold 300 DM; 1912 – Possibly also listed as Bussard
Kapelle im Wald	Chapel in the Forest	1907	Oil on canvas, dimensions unknown	1907 – Galerie Heinemann Catalogue, Sold 350 DM
Wildenroth	Wildenroth (Grafrath)	1907	Oil on canvas, dimensions unknown	1907 – Galerie Heinemann Catalogue, Sold 400 DM
Blick auf die Amperschlucht - Schongeising	View of Amper Gorge - Schöngeising	1907	Oil on canvas, dimensions unknown	1907 – Galerie Heinemann Catalogue, Sold 450 DM
Abend	Evening	1907	Oil on canvas, dimensions unknown	1907 – Galerie Heinemann Catalogue, Sold 280 DM
Hund im Wasser	Dog in Water	1907	Oil on canvas, dimensions unknown	1907 – Galerie Heinemann Catalogue; 1907 – Listed in ‘’Berliner Kunst-Herold’’, Issue 1/2 (1907). Sold 400 DM; 1907 – Exhibited at the Württembergischer Kunstverein, listed in Neues Tagblatt und General-Anzeiger für Stuttgart und Württemberg, 5 January 1907, p. 2.
Hahnenkampf	Cockfight	1907	Oil on canvas, dimensions unknown	1907 – Galerie Heinemann Catalogue; Mentioned in the 1912 Dresdner Nachrichten newspaper for display of The Exhibitors' Association of Munich Artists (Emil Richter's Art Salon).; Listed in Brakl's Moderne Kunsthandlung (Munich), 1925, cat. no. 548, priced 500 RM.; Unknown if all sources cite same work (or just like subjects with same title).
Enten	Ducks	1907	Oil on canvas, dimensions unknown	1907 – Listed in ‘’Berliner Kunst-Herold’’, Issue 1/2 (1907).; 1907 – Galerie Heinemann Catalogue, Sold 400 DM
Wolkenschatten	Cloud Shadows	1907	Oil on canvas, dimensions unknown	1907 – Galerie Heinemann Catalogue, Sold 350 DM
Hühner	Chickens	1907	Oil on canvas, dimensions unknown	1907 – Galerie Heinemann Catalogue
Blick auf Grafrath	View of Grafrath	1907	Oil on canvas, dimensions unknown	1907 – Galerie Heinemann Catalogue, Sold 250 DM
Wachholderlandschaft in der Heide	Juniper Landscape in the Heath	1907	Oil on canvas, dimensions unknown	1907 – Galerie Heinemann Catalogue, Sold 250 DM
Wildenroth an der Amper	Wildenroth (Grafrath) on the Amper River	1907	Oil on canvas, dimensions unknown	1907 – Galerie Heinemann Catalogue, Sold 450 DM
Grafrath	Grafrath	1907	Oil on canvas, dimensions unknown	1907 – Galerie Heinemann Catalogue, Sold 450 DM
Bauernjunge	Farm Boy	1907	Oil on canvas, dimensions unknown	1907 – Galerie Heinemann Catalogue, Sold 150 DM
Enten im Wasser	Ducks in the Water	1907	Oil on canvas, dimensions unknown	1907 – Galerie Heinemann Catalogue, Sold 350 DM
Kornernte	Grain Harvest	1907	Oil on canvas, dimensions unknown	1907 – Galerie Heinemann Catalogue, Sold 700
Oktoberfest	Oktoberfest	1908	Ink drawing, colored, 37 × 35 cm	1937 – Offered at Adolf Weinmüller auction, Munich (28–29 May 1937), lot 648; unsold.; 2024 – Registered in the Lost Art Database of the German Lost Art Foundation as missing. The entry forms part of a search request concerning the collection of Munich art dealer Ludwig Heymann and his wife Therese (née Abeles).
Mittagsonne (Enten)	Midday Sun (Ducks)	1908	Oil on canvas, dimensions unknown	1908 – Listed in Münchener Künstlergenossenschaft: Ausstellung im Kgl. Glaspalast zu München, 1. Juni – Ende Oktober 1908, Offizieller Katalog.
Eisbär im Zwinger	Polar Bear in the Enclosure	1908	Colored drawing, dimensions unknown	1908 – Listed in Münchener Künstlergenossenschaft: Ausstellung im Kgl. Glaspalast zu München, 1. Juni – Ende Oktober 1908, Offizieller Katalog.
Haidschnucken	Health Sheep or Moorland Sheep	1908	Oil on canvas, dimensions unknown	1908 – Listed in Berliner Kunst-Herold, Issue 17 (1908).
Hühner	Chickens	1909	Pastel, 34.5 × 52 cm	1919 – Listed in Rudolf Bangel auction catalogue, Frankfurt am Main (1 April 1919), lot 175. Signed “Willy Tiedjen 09.”
Kühe im Wasser	Cows in Water	1909	Oil on canvas, 50 × 70 cm	1937 – Offered at Adolf Weinmüller auction, Munich (11–12 November 1937), lot 246. Signed and dated “W. Tiedjen 09.”
Holländischer Kanal mit Lastkähnen	Dutch Canal with Barges	1909	Oil on canvas, 42.5 × 64.5 cm	1937 – Offered at Adolf Weinmüller auction, Munich (11–12 November 1937), lot 247. Signed and dated “W. Tiedjen 09.”
In der Heide bei Fallingbostel	In the Heath near Bad Fallingbostel	1909	Oil on canvas, dimensions unknown	1909 – Exhibited at the Württembergischer Kunstvereinm, alongside F. Tiedjen-Bieber (exhibiting Heidelandschaft).
Im Hühnerhof	In the Chicken Yard	1909	Oil on canvas, dimensions unknown	1909 – Exhibited at Kunstverein München, reported in Münchener Tagesneuigkeiten, General-Anzeiger der Münchener Neuesten Nachrichten (1909).
In der Heide bei Fallingbostel	In the Heath near Fallingbostel	1909	Oil on canvas, dimensions unknown	1909 – Exhibited at the Württembergischer Kunstverein (Stuttgart), listed in Berliner Kunst-Herold, Issue 16 (1909).
Hühner	Chickens	1909	Pastel, H. 34.5 cm × W. 52 cm (signed and dated 1909)	1919 – Listed in Rudolf Bangel auction catalogue, Frankfurt am Main (1 April 1919), lot 175.
Truthahn	Turkey	1909	Oil on canvas, dimensions unknown	1909 – Listed in Berliner Kunst-Herold, Issue 14.
Enten im Wasser	Ducks in the Water	1909	Oil on canvas (animal painting), dimensions unknown	1909 – Exhibited at Kunstverein München, reported in Münchener Tagesneuigkeiten, General-Anzeiger der Münchener Neuesten Nachrichten.
Niedersächsischer Bauernhof	Lower Saxon Farmstead	1909	Oil on canvas, dimensions unknown	1909 – Exhibited at the Württembergischer Kunstverein.
Truthühner	Turkeys	1910	Oil on canvas	Sold during the XXVI annual exhibition at Künstlerhaus Salzburg. Listed in the first sales list published in the Czernowitzer Zeitung.
Schreiender Truthahn	Screaming Turkey	1910	Oil on canvas, dimensions unknown	1910 – Illustrated in Katalog der Ausstellung des Deutschen Künstlerbundes, Darmstadt, 12 May–16 October 1910, p. 100.
An den Dünen bei Katwijk	At the Dunes near Katwijk	1910	Oil on canvas, dimensions unknown	1910 – Listed in Dresdner Journal, 7 March 1910, p. 5.
Gracht bei Leyden	Canal near Leiden	1910	Oil on canvas, dimensions unknown	1910 – Listed in Dresdner Journal, 7 March 1910, p. 5.
Truthenne mit jungen Enten	Turkey Hen with Young Ducks	1910	Oil on canvas (animal painting), dimensions unknown	1910 – Exhibited at Kunstverein München, reported in Münchener Tagesneuigkeiten, General-Anzeiger der Münchener Neuesten Nachrichten (1910).
Morgen auf der Heide	Morning on the Heath	1910	Oil on canvas, dimensions unknown	1910 – Exhibited at Kunstverein München, reported in Münchener Tagesneuigkeiten, General-Anzeiger der Münchener Neuesten Nachrichten (29 Jan 1910).
Enten auf einem Teich	Ducks on a Pond	ca. 1910s–1920s	Postcard reproduction, dimensions unknown	Published by Theo. Stroefer's Kunstverlag, Nürnberg (T.S.N., Serie 942, 6 Dess.). Original painting unlocated.
Abwinteln	Late Winter	1910	Oil on canvas, dimensions unknown	1910 – Exhibited at Kunstverein München, reported in Münchener Tagesneuigkeiten, General-Anzeiger der Münchener Neuesten Nachrichten (29 Jan 1910).
Abend auf hoher See	Evening on the High Seas	1910	Oil on canvas, dimensions unknown	1910 – Exhibited at Kunstverein München, reported in Münchener Tagesneuigkeiten, General-Anzeiger der Münchener Neuesten Nachrichten (29 Jan 1910).
Schreiender Truthahn	Screaming Turkey	1910	Oil on canvas, dimensions unknown	1910 – Exhibited at the Deutsche Künstlerbund exhibition, Darmstadt (Städtisches Ausstellungsgebäude auf der Mathildenhöhe); illustrated in the official catalogue.
Schafe im Schatten	Sheep in the Shade	1911	Oil on canvas, dimensions unknown	Exhibited at Mannheimer Kunstverein, Mannheim.
Muschelfischer	Shell fishers	1911	Oil on canvas, dimensions unknown	Exhibited at Mannheimer Kunstverein, Mannheim.
Kahn im Schilf	Boat in the Reeds	1911	Oil on canvas, dimensions unknown	1911 – Listed as sold at the Salzburg Künstlerhaus Spring Exhibition (9–30 April 1911), reported in Allgemeine Zeitung (20 May 1911).
Rast im Hof	Rest in the Courtyard	1911	Oil on canvas, dimensions unknown	1911 – Listed as sold at the Salzburg Künstlerhaus Spring Exhibition (9–30 April 1911), reported in Allgemeine Zeitung (20 May 1911).
Im Ufergestripp	In the Thicket (Hunting Cover)	1911	Oil on canvas, dimensions unknown	1911 – Listed in Münchener Künstlergenossenschaft. Ausstellung im Kgl. Glaspalast zu München, anniversary exhibition catalogue (Munich Annual Exhibition 1911, Glaspalast).
In der Abendsonne	In the Evening Sun	1911	Oil on canvas, dimensions unknown	1911 – Listed and illustrated in Münchener Künstlergenossenschaft. Ausstellung im Kgl. Glaspalast zu München, anniversary exhibition catalogue (Munich Annual Exhibition 1911, Glaspalast).; 1914 – Listed in Daheim (September 1914).
Tiere im Hamburger Zoologischen Garten (collection of works)	Animals in the Hamburg Zoological Garden	1911	Oil on canvas, dimensions unknown	1911 – Exhibited thirty-four animal paintings at the Munich Glass Palace (Glaspalast), the majority based on subjects from the Hamburg Zoological Garden. Contemporary critics praised his lions as "majestic, powerful, but also noble and full of life," his tigers for their "glow and dangerous elegance," bears, and monkeys for their "liveliness and truth to nature," and birds of prey for their lifelike poses.
Löwin	Lioness	1911	Oil on canvas	Sold during the spring exhibition at Künstlerhaus Salzburg.
Pfau im Hof	Peacock in the Courtyard	1911	Oil on canvas	Sold during the spring exhibition at Künstlerhaus Salzburg.
Hühner in der Mittagspause	Chickens During the Lunch Break	1911	Oil on canvas	Exhibited in the Tierstücke (animal painting) section of the spring exhibition of the Gesellschaft der bildenden Künstler Wiens (Vienna Künstlerhaus). Listed among notable foreign contributors.
Schäferherde in der Heide	Shepherd with Flock in the Heath	1912	Oil on canvas, H. 58 cm × W. 78 cm (signed), gold frame	1912 – Listed in Ölgemälde moderner Meister (Kunstsalon Keller & Reiner, Berlin), no. 146, illustrated plate 17.
Windmühle und Sägewerk am Ufer eines Gewässers	Windmill and Sawmill on the Shore of a Body of Water	1912	Colored pencil on board, H. 59 cm × W. 78 cm (signed), gold frame	1912 – Listed in Ölgemälde moderner Meister (Kunstsalon Keller & Reiner / Galerie Fritz Gerstel, Berlin), no. 121.
Heuernte auf der schwäbischen Alp	Hay Harvest on the Swabian Alp	1912	Oil on canvas, 61 × 90 cm	8 Dec 2018 – Offered at Kunst & Auktionshaus Ruef, Christmas Auction (Lot 231), limit €500; provenance noted as a South German collection of Zügel pupils; unsold.
Vor Anker	At Anchor	1912	Oil on cardboard, H. 32 cm × W. 47.5 cm	1912 – Listed in Galerie Del Vecchio auction catalogue, Leipzig, 22 October 1912, lot 210. Catalog description: Depicts a barque (sailing vessel) with brown sails in the foreground, with the silhouette of a city visible in the distance.
Enten im Teich	Ducks in the Pond	1912	Oil on canvas, H. 35 cm × W. 60 cm (signed and dated 1912), black frame	1935 – Listed in Dorotheum auction catalogue, Vienna, 8 November 1935, lot 179.
Muschelfischer	Mussel Fishers (Fishermen)	1912	Oil on canvas, H. 96 cm × W. 142 cm (signed), white frame	1912 – Listed in Ölgemälde moderner Meister (Kunstsalon Keller & Reiner / Galerie Fritz Gerstel, Berlin). Catalogue description: Two fishermen in two horse-drawn carts are engaged in catching mussels. Beautiful cloudy sky, choppy sea.
Schreiender Ton-Hahn	Crowing Rooster	1912	Oil on canvas, dimensions unknown	1912 – Exhibited at Kunstverein München, reported in Münchener Tagesneuigkeiten, General-Anzeiger der Münchener Neuesten Nachrichten (16 Feb 1912).
Pflügender Bauer	Ploughing Farmer	1912	Oil on canvas, dimensions unknown	1912 – Exhibited at Kunstverein München, reported in Münchener Tagesneuigkeiten, General-Anzeiger der Münchener Neuesten Nachrichten (16 Feb 1912).
Hühnerhof	Chicken Yard	1912	Oil on canvas, H. 70 cm × W. 105 cm (signed), black frame	1912 – Listed in Ölgemälde moderner Meister (Kunstsalon Keller & Reiner / Galerie Fritz Gerstel, Berlin), no. 206.
Enten in der Sonne	Ducks in the Sun	1912	Oil on canvas, dimensions unknown	1912 – Listed in Münchener Künstlergenossenschaft: Ausstellung im Kgl. Glaspalast zu München, 1. Juni – Ende Oktober 1912, Offizieller Katalog.; 1916 – Exhibited at the Große Berliner Kunstausstellung, Berlin, Saal 14d, no. 541.
Abend in den Bergen	Evening in the Mountains	1912	Oil on canvas, dimensions unknown	1912 – Listed in Münchener Künstlergenossenschaft: Ausstellung im Kgl. Glaspalast zu München, 1. Juni – Ende Oktober 1912, Offizieller Katalog.; 1925 – Reproduced in Brakls Moderne Kunsthandlung (Munich: Brakls Kunsthaus). Title listed in catalog, original painting unlocated.
Abend in Hamburger Hafen I	Evening in Hamburg Harbor I	1912	Oil on canvas, dimensions unknown	1912 – Listed in ‘’Der Cicerone’’, Issue 20 (1912).
Abend im Hamburger Hafen II	Evening in Hamburg Harbor II	1912	Oil on canvas, dimensions unknown	1912 – Listed in ‘’Der Cicerone’’, Issue 20 (1912).
Enten	Ducks	1912	Oil on canvas, H. 60 cm × W. 80 cm (signed), black frame	1912 – Listed in Ölgemälde moderner Meister (Kunstsalon Keller & Reiner / Galerie Fritz Gerstel, Berlin). Catalogue description: Several ducks playfully swimming on a pond.
Enten	Ducks	1912	Pencil study on paper, 21 × 37 cm	1925 – Listed in Karl & Faber Art and Literature Antiquarian Bookstore Catalogue (No. 16: Drawings and Watercolors), Munich.
Entenbilder	Duck pictures (not listed specifically)	1912	—	Exhibited at Württembergischer Kunstverein (Stuttgart), reopening exhibition beginning 1 September 1912.
Reiher	Heron	1912	—	Exhibited at Württembergischer Kunstverein (Stuttgart).
Kinder im Garten	Children in the Garden	1912	—	Exhibited at Württembergischer Kunstverein (Stuttgart).
Enten	Ducks	1913	Oil on canvas, H. 60 cm × W. 100 cm (signed and dated 1913)	1913 – Listed in Kunstsalon Bernhard Teichert auction catalogue, Königsberg, 15 October 1913, lot 187.
Frühlingsweide	Spring Pasture	1913	Oil on canvas, dimensions unknown	1913 – Listed in Illustrierter Katalog der XI. Internationalen Kunstausstellung im Königlichen Glaspalast zu München (11th International Art Exhibition, Glaspalast, Munich).
Heidschnucken	Heath Sheep	1913	Etching, dimensions unknown	1913 – Listed in Illustrierter Katalog der XI. Internationalen Kunstausstellung im Königlichen Glaspalast zu München, official catalogue. Illustrated in article gallery.
Ziegen in den Dünen	Goats in the Dunes	1913	Etching, dimensions unknown	1913 – Listed in Illustrierter Katalog der XI. Internationalen Kunstausstellung im Königlichen Glaspalast zu München, official catalogue.
Truthühner	Turkeys	1913	Oil on canvas, 58 × 113 cm	1913 – Offered at auction, Kunstsalon Keller & Reiner, Berlin (30 April 1913).
Peasant and Two Horses in Field	Peasant and Two Horses in Field	1913	Oil on canvas, 55 × 75 cm	6 Nov 1991 – Sold at Neumeister, Munich, Lot 1165, for DM 1,900 (approx. £655 / $1,150).
Truthühner	Guinea Fowl (Turkeys)	1913	Oil on canvas, 64 × 93 cm	1913 – Listed in Antiquitäten aus gräflichem Besitz, Kunstsalon Keller & Reiner auction (Berlin, 30 April 1913), lot 57.
Die Heldentat der Königin Luise vor der Themse	The Heroic Deed of the Königin Luise off the Thames	1914	Watercolor (original), postcard reproduction, dimensions unknown	c. 1914–1917 – Issued as postcard; depicts ferry steamer Königin Luise converted to minelayer, sunk 5 August 1914. Original painting unlocated.
Hühnergruppe	Group of Chickens	1914	Gouache, 35 × 53 cm	1914 – Listed in Rudolf Bangel auction catalogue, Frankfurt am Main (7–8 April 1914), lot 183.; 1915 – Listed again in Rudolf Bangel auction catalogue, Frankfurt am Main (4–5 May 1915), lot 164.
Steinadler	Golden Eagle	1914	Medium and dimensions unknown	1914 – Exhibited at the Grosse Berliner Kunstausstellung, Berlin (catalog entry no. 2214).; 1914 – Listed in Münchener Künstlergenossenschaft. Ausstellung im Kgl. Glaspalast zu München, official catalogue.; 1920 – Listed in Rudolf Bangel auction, Frankfurt am Main, 15–17 June 1920 (lot 910).
Am Ufer	At the Shore	1914	Oil on canvas, 40 × 65 cm, signed lower left	1914 – Auctioned at Leipziger Kunstsalon, 29–30 April 1914.
Enten	Ducks	1914	Oil on canvas, 46 × 64 cm, signed lower left	1914 – Auctioned at Leipziger Kunstsalon, 29–30 April 1914.
Enten	Ducks	1914	Oil on canvas, 60 × 100 cm, signed lower right	1914 – Auctioned at Leipziger Kunstsalon, 29–30 April 1914.
Entenbild I	Ducks I	1914	Oil on canvas, dimensions unknown	1914 – Listed in Münchener Künstlergenossenschaft. Ausstellung im Kgl. Glaspalast zu München, official catalogue (Munich Annual Exhibition 1914, Glaspalast).
Entenbild II	Ducks II	1914	Oil on canvas, dimensions unknown	1914 – Listed in Münchener Künstlergenossenschaft. Ausstellung im Kgl. Glaspalast zu München, official catalogue.
Wolfshund	Wolfhound	1914	Oil on canvas, dimensions unknown	1914 – Listed in Münchener Künstlergenossenschaft. Ausstellung im Kgl. Glaspalast zu München, official catalogue.; 1916 – Exhibited at the Große Berliner Kunstausstellung, Berlin, Saal 14d, no. 620.
Ein schattiger Winkel	A Shady Corner	1914	Colored drawing, dimensions unknown	1914 – Listed in Münchener Künstlergenossenschaft. Ausstellung im Kgl. Glaspalast zu München, official catalogue.
Eisbär	Polar Bear	1914	Etching, dimensions unknown	1914 – Listed in Münchener Künstlergenossenschaft. Ausstellung im Kgl. Glaspalast zu München, official catalogue.
Eisbären	Polar Bears	1914	Medium and dimensions unknown	1914 – Exhibited at the Grosse Berliner Kunstausstellung, Berlin (catalog entry no. 2210).
Deutsche Torpedoboote greifen einen englischen Kreuzer an	German Torpedo Boats Attack an English Cruiser (World War I)	1914	Watercolor, H. 41 cm × W. 25.5 cm (signed), black frame	1917 – Listed in Hugo Helbing auction catalogue, Munich, 27 March 1917, lot 268.
Deutsches Linienschiff im Kampfe mit feindlichen Torpedobooten	German Battleship Fighting Enemy Torpedo Boats (World War I)	1914	Watercolor, H. 49 cm × W. 31 cm (signed), black frame	1917 – Listed in Hugo Helbing auction catalogue, Munich, 27 March 1917, lot 269.
Ein deutscher Kreuzer kapert einen englischen Handelsdampfer	A German Cruiser Captures an English Merchant Steamer (World War I)	1914	Watercolor, H. 41 cm × W. 26 cm (signed), black frame	1917 – Listed in Hugo Helbing auction catalogue, Munich, 27 March 1917, lot 270.
Schäferhund mit Herde	Shepherd Dog with Herd	ca. 1915	Oil on canvas, 120 × 170 cm	Neumeister Art Auctions, Inventory No. Lot 589, 1 July 1992, and recorded in Bildindex der Kunst & Architektur.
Schafweide	Sheep Pasture	1915	Oil on canvas, 80 × 125 cm. Signed and dated (lower left: "W. Tiedjen 15"). Framed.	1954 - Sold at Galerie F. H. Zinckgraf estate auction, Stuttgart Kunstkabinett, 8 October 1954.; Illustrated in auction catalogue (Plate VI). Painting Schafweide image available online.
Gefangenentransport	Prisoner transport	ca. 1915–1917	Postcard reproduction	ca. 1915–1917 – Issued as a postcard reproduction; original painting unlocated. (Image reproduced in this article's gallery).
Truthahn und Henne auf einer Wiese	Turkey and Hen in a Meadow	1916	On canvas, 65 × 95 cm	1916 – Sold at Rudolph Lepke's Kunst-Auctions-Haus, Berlin (4 April 1916), lot 225. Signed.
Märzsonne	March Sun	1916	Oil on canvas, H. 57 cm × W. 74 cm (signed), gold frame	1916 – Listed in the Hugo Helbing auction catalogue (Munich, 21 June 1916), lot 101. Catalog description: Melting snow with a river running through a wooded hill landscape under the bright March sun. This work was contributed to a charity auction organized by Munich artists in support of the Red Crescent, providing medical and humanitarian aid during World War I.
Vorfrühling im Gebirge	Early Spring in the Mountains	1916	Oil on canvas, dimensions unknown	1916 – Listed in Münchener Jahres-Ausstellung 1916 im Königlichen Glaspalast (Munich Annual Exhibition 1916, Glaspalast).
Sommertag, Jungvieh	Summer Day, Young Cattle	1916	Oil on canvas, dimensions unknown	1916 – Listed in Münchener Jahres-Ausstellung 1916 im Königlichen Glaspalast, official catalogue.
Toter Gockel	Dead Rooster	1916	Oil on canvas, dimensions unknown	1916 – Listed in Münchener Jahres-Ausstellung 1916 im Königlichen Glaspalast, official catalogue.
Föhnstimmung am Wetterstein	Föhn Weather at the Wetterstein	1916	Oil on canvas, dimensions unknown	1916 – Listed in Münchener Jahres-Ausstellung 1916 im Königlichen Glaspalast, official catalogue.
Enten auf dem Wasser	Ducks on the Water	1916	Oil on canvas, 47 × 71 cm (signed and dated lower right)	1916 – Documented in Bildindex der Kunst & Architektur; provenance includes Central Collecting Point Marburg (1945–1946) and Central Collecting Point Wiesbaden (1945–1948).
Zur Erntezeit	At Harvest Time	1916	Oil on canvas, dimensions unknown	1916 – Reproduced in Daheim (No. 40–44, July 1916).; Painting At Harvest Time image available online.
Die Heldentat der Königin Luise vor der Themse	The Heroic Deed of the Königin Luise off the Thames	1917	Aquarell (watercolor)	Sold at the 1915 annual exhibition of the Künstlerhaus Salzburg.; 1917 – Issued as a postcard reproduction, cited with Druck u. Verlag Münchener Graphische Gesellschaft, Pick & Co., München.
Turkey and Chickens	Turkey and Chickens	1917	Oil on board, 31 × 49 cm	26 Mar 1987 – Sold at Neumeister, Munich, Lot 272, for DM 1,329 (approx. £632 / $1,045); signed and dated 1917.
Enten	Ducks	1917	Oil on canvas, H. 70 cm × W. 108 cm (signed)	1917 – Listed in Leipzig Art Salon auction catalogue, Leipzig, 23 October 1917, lot 231.
Herbstszene	Autumn Scene	1917	Oil on canvas, 38 × 56 cm (signed lower right, dated 1917)	1 Dec 1999 – Auctioned at Neumeister, Munich, Auktion A306, Lot 836. “Six ducks at the water’s edge beneath autumn branches.”
Enten auf dem Wasser	Ducks on the Water	1917	Oil on canvas, 57 × 93 cm (signed and dated lower right)	14 Mar 1990 – Auctioned at Neumeister, Munich, Nr. 254, Lot 793.
Enten Unter Weiden	Ducks Under the Willows	1917	Oil on canvas, 64 × 92.5 cm, gold frame	1917 – Listed in Ölgemälde moderner Meister: vorwiegend süddeutscher Besitz und aus Nachlässen (Hugo Helbing, Munich, 5 July 1917), lot 275. Signed “W. Tiedjen.”
Hamburger Hafen: Schlepper im Volldampf	Hamburg Harbor: Tug in Full Steam	1917	Oil on canvas, dimensions unknown	1917 – Listed in FW Haschke, Book and Art Antiquarian Bookstore (Leipzig), Katalog Nr. 16, lot 13. Vollsigniert.
Enten am Teich	Ducks at the Pond	1917	Pencil drawing, dimensions unknown	1917 – Listed in FW Haschke, Book and Art Antiquarian Bookstore (Leipzig), Katalog Nr. 16, lot 759. Signiert.
Mittenwald in Oberbayern	Mittenwald in Upper Bavaria	1917	Oil on canvas, dimensions unknown	1917 – Reproduced in Daheim, Issue 14–17 (1917).; Painting Mittenwald in Upper Bavaria image available online - pending adding image to article.
Enten am Teichrand	Ducks at the Pond’s Edge	1918	Oil on canvas, 61 × 99 cm (signed, titled, and dated 1918 on the reverse)	4 May 1988 – Auctioned at Sotheby’s London, Nineteenth Century European Paintings, Lot 150. Listed as £2,000-3,000.
Enten	Ducks	1918	Oil on canvas, dimensions unknown	1918 – Listed in Catalogue of the painting collection of Prof. Gustav Gaupp and various private collections, Stuttgart auction (11–12 December 1918), lot 636.
Drei Enten im Graben	Three Ducks in a Ditch	1918	Oil on canvas, 46 × 65 cm	1918 – Sold at Rudolph Lepke's Kunst-Auctions-Haus, Berlin (16 April 1918), lot 6. Signed.
Enten	Ducks	1919	Oil on canvas, H. 46 cm × W. 64 cm (signed)	1919 – Listed in Leipzig Art Salon auction catalogue, Leipzig, 28–29 October 1919, lot 252.
Enten im Wasser	Ducks in the Water	1919	Oil on cardboard, 40 × 61 cm, black frame (signed bottom right and dated 1919)	1938 – Listed in Kunst-Auktionshaus B. Pfeuffer: Ölgemälde 17., 18. und 19. Jahrhundert, Perser-Teppiche, Möbel, Silber, Porzellan, Fayencen, Zinn, Holzplastik, Bronzen, geschliff. Gläser (Nürnberg, 28 June 1938), lot 190. Signed and dated 1919.
Enten	Ducks	1919	Oil on canvas, H. 40 cm × W. 65 cm (signed)	1919 – Listed in Leipzig Art Salon auction catalogue, Leipzig, 28–29 October 1919, lot 253.
Amerikanischer Büffel	American Buffalo	1919	Oil, monogrammed	1919 – Listed in Rudolph Lepke's Kunst-Auctions-Haus, Berlin (6–7 May 1919), lot 198 (Estate of Ludwig J. Lippert, Hamburg).
Eisbär	Polar Bear	1919	Oil, monogrammed	1919 – Listed in Lepke Berlin auction, lot 199.
Tiger	Tiger	1919	Gouache, signed	1919 – Listed in Lepke Berlin auction, lot 200.
Kopf eines Krokodils	Head of a Crocodile	1919	Pen drawing, signed	1919 – Listed in Lepke Berlin auction, lot 201.
Paradiesvogel	Bird of Paradise	1919	Gouache, signed	1919 – Listed in Lepke Berlin auction, lot 202.
Dromedar	Dromedary	1919	Gouache, signed	1919 – Listed in Lepke Berlin auction, lot 203.
Kopf eines Löwen	Head of a Lion	1919	Gouache and oil	1919 – Listed in Lepke Berlin auction, lot 204.
Schimpanse	Chimpanzee	1919	Gouache and oil, signed	1919 – Listed in Lepke Berlin auction, lot 205.
Kakadu	Cockatoo	1919	Watercolor, signed	1919 – Listed in Lepke Berlin auction, lot 206.
Papagei; Flamingos	Parrot; Flamingos	1919	Gouaches, signed	1919 – Listed in Lepke Berlin auction, lot 207 (two sheets).
Hühnerhof	Chicken Yard	1919	Pastel, 34.5 × 52 cm	1919 – Listed in Rudolf Bangel auction catalogue, Frankfurt am Main (3–5 June 1919), lot 205.
Vier Enten am Bache. Winter	Four Ducks at the Brook. Winter	1919	Oil on board, 33 × 49 cm	1919 – Listed in Rudolf Lepke's Kunst-Auctions-Haus, Berlin, auction of Munich private collections, 28 October 1919, lot 35. Signed “V. Tiedjen.” (Signature note needs verification.)
Waldkapelle	Forest Chapel	1919	Oil on canvas, 66 × 55 cm	1919 – Sold at Rudolf Bangel auction catalogue, Frankfurt am Main (24 June 1919), lot 90; signed “W. Tiedjen” lower right.
Weidende Ziegen	Grazing Goats	1919	Oil on canvas, dimensions unknown	1919 – Listed in Munich Art Exhibition 1919 in the Glass Palace: official catalogue.
Arbeitspause	Work Break	1919	Oil on canvas, dimensions unknown	1919 – Listed in Munich Art Exhibition 1919 in the Glass Palace: official catalogue.
Frühlingsmorgen an der Ilm	Spring Morning on the Ilm	1919	Oil on canvas, dimensions unknown	1919 – Listed in Munich Art Exhibition 1919 in the Glass Palace: official catalogue.
Pferd	Horse	1920	Oil painting in gilt frame (dimensions not specified)	1920 – Listed in Otto Battiány Art Gallery auction catalogue. Catalog description: Oil painting of a horse, presented in a gilt frame.
Steinadler	Golden Eagle	1920	Original etching (folio with margins)	1920 – Listed in Rudolf Bangel auction catalogue, Frankfurt am Main, 15–17 June 1920, lot 910. Catalog description: Original etching of a golden eagle, folio format with margins.
Drei Hasen	Three Hares	1920	Original etching (small folio with margins)	1920 – Listed in Rudolf Bangel auction catalogue, Frankfurt am Main, 15–17 June 1920, lot 911. Catalog description: Original etching showing three hares, small folio format with margins.
Stehendes Dromedar	Standing Dromedary (Arabian Camel)	1920	Watercolor and gouache on paper, dimensions 52 × 40 cm (1920 listing); 51 × 40 cm (1921 listing)	1920 – Listed in Rudolph Lepke's Kunst-Auctions-Haus Berlin: Auction, 28–29 September 1920, lot 343.; 1921 – Listed in Rudolph Lepke's Kunst-Auctions-Haus Berlin: Auction, 13–14 December 1921, lot 348.
Vor dem Stall	Before the Stable	1920	Oil on canvas, dimensions unknown	1920 – Listed in Münchener Jahres-Ausstellung 1920 im Glaspalast (Munich Art Exhibition 1920, Glaspalast).
Vorfrühling in Partenkirchen	Early Spring in Partenkirchen	1920	Oil on canvas, dimensions unknown	1920 – Listed in Münchener Jahres-Ausstellung 1920 im Glaspalast, official catalogue.
Entenfamilie	Duck Family	1920	Oil on canvas, dimensions unknown	1920 – Listed in Münchener Jahres-Ausstellung 1920 im Glaspalast, official catalogue.
Wintermorgen auf der Elbe	Winter Morning on the Elbe	1921	Medium and dimensions unknown	1921 – Exhibited at the Grosse Berliner Kunstausstellung, Berlin (catalog entry no. 753).
Geflügelhof	Poultry Yard	1921	Oil on cardboard, H. 43 cm × W. 64 cm (under glass, dark frame)	1921 – Listed in Hugo Helbing auction catalogue, Galerie Helbing, Munich, 15–16 November 1921, lot 479. Catalog description: Turkeys and chickens at the feeding trough in a snow-covered farmyard. The work is executed on cardboard, set under glass, and presented in a dark frame.
Hühnerhof	Chicken Yard	1921	Oil on canvas, dimensions unknown	1921 – Listed in Munich Art Exhibition 1921 in the Glass Palace: official catalogue.
Wintermorgen auf der Elbe	Winter Morning on the Elbe	1921	Oil on canvas, dimensions unknown	1921 – Exhibited at the Große Berliner Kunstausstellung (Great Berlin Art Exhibition), Landesausstellungsgebäude am Lehrter Bahnhof, Berlin. Catalogue no. 752.
Ziegen auf der Hochalm	Goats on the High Alpine Pasture	1921	Oil on canvas, dimensions unknown	1921 – Listed in Munich Art Exhibition 1921 in the Glass Palace: official catalogue.
Ammerseedampfer	Steamer on Lake Ammer (Ammersea)	1922	Oil on cardboard, 33.5 × 50 cm (under glass, dark frame)	1922 – Listed in Hugo Helbing auction catalogue, Munich, 14–16 March 1922, lot 678. Catalog description: Shows a steamer with a white-and-blue flag at the landing stage, with a small boat in the foreground and people enjoying a summer day.
Abend im Gebirge	Evening in the Mountains	1922	Oil on canvas, 72 x 55	1922 – Listed in ‘’Münchener Künstlergenossenschaft. Ausstellung im Kgl. Glaspalast zu München’’, official catalogue (Munich Art Exhibition 1922, Glaspalast). Dimensions not listed although the title of the works matches the 1922 display so keeping information together.; 1923 – Listed in Eugen Reiz Art Auction House (Berlin) catalogue, Paintings, Watercolors and Drawings from Private and Other Ownership, 15–17 May 1923, lot 120.
Dampfer mit Ausflüglern am Landungssteg	Steamer with Excursionists at the Landing Stage	c. 1923	Oil on cardboard, H. 40 cm × W. 59 cm (signed)	1923 – Listed in Galerie Rave (Adolf Pohl Auction House) catalogue Gemälde aus Hamburger Privatbesitz; Japan-, China- und Orient-Kunstgegenstände, Hamburg, 20–22 March 1923, lot 172.
Bauer mit Rössern	Farmer with Horses	1923	Oil on canvas, 57.5 × 74.5 cm	Photographed in 1991 and recorded in Bildindex der Kunst & Architektur. Neumeister Art Auctions, Inventory No. Lot 678, 13 March 1991.
Enten	Ducks	1923	Oil on canvas, 72 × 55 cm, gold frame	1923 – Listed in Eugen Reiz Art Auction House (Berlin) catalogue, Paintings, Watercolors and Drawings from Private and Other Ownership, 15–17 May 1923, lot 121.
Mittelwald	Middle Forest	1923	Oil on canvas, 72 × 55 cm, black frame	1923 – Listed in Eugen Reiz Art Auction House (Berlin) catalogue, Paintings, Watercolors and Drawings from Private and Other Ownership, 15–17 May 1923, lot 122.
Hühnerhof mit Truthahn	Chicken Yard with Turkey	1923	Oil on canvas, dimensions unknown	1923 – Listed in Munich Art Exhibition 1923 in the Glass Palace: official catalogue.
Enten im Schilf	Ducks in the Reeds	1923	Oil on canvas, dimensions unknown	1923 – Listed in Munich Art Exhibition 1923 in the Glass Palace: official catalogue.
Vorfrühling. Schafe auf der Weide	Early Spring: Sheep in Pasture	1923	Oil on canvas, 70 × 100 cm (inscribed “W. Tiedjen 15”), wood frame	1923 – Listed in Hugo Helbing auction catalogue, Munich, 10 July 1923, lot 800.
Zwei Geier	Two Vultures	1923	Oil on cardboard, 45 × 66 cm (inscribed “W. Tiedjen 16”), wood frame	1923 – Listed in Hugo Helbing auction catalogue, Munich, 10 July 1923 and following days, lot 800a.
Dampfer mit Ausflüglern am Landungssteg	Steamer with Excursionists at the Landing Stage	1923	Oil on cardboard, 40 × 59 cm, signed	1923 - Auctioned at Galerie Rave (Hamburg), Adolf Pohl Kunstauktionshaus, 20–22 March 1923.
Angeschirrter Stier unter einem Baum	Harnessed Bull under a Tree	1924	Oil on canvas, 53 × 64 cm	1924 – Listed in Galerie Helbing catalog, Munich, 15–16 July 1924, lot 396. Catalog description: Depicts a harnessed bull standing beneath a tree.
Enten im Schilfwasser	Ducks in Reeds	1924	Oil on canvas, 40 × 60 cm (signed lower right, dated 1924)	8 Apr 1995 – Auctioned at Böhm & Lauterbach, Göttingen, Frühjahrsauktion, Lot 161. “Ducks in calm water near shoreline reeds.”
Truthähne	Turkeys	1924	Oil on canvas, H. 50 cm × W. 70 cm (signed and dated 1924)	1926 – Listed in Carl F. Schlüter Autumn Art Auction Catalogue, Hamburg, 26–29 October 1926, lot 265.
Am Seeufer	At the Lake Shore	1924	Oil on canvas, 50 × 70 cm (signed lower right, dated 1924)	24 Oct 1998 – Auctioned at Schuler, Lot 379. “Ducks swimming near overhanging branches.” Listed for 3500, not sold.
Im Lübecker Hafen	In Lübeck Harbor	1924	Oil on canvas, dimensions unknown	1924 – Reproduced in Jugend: Münchner illustrierte Wochenschrift für Kunst und Leben, vol. 29, no. 36 (25 October 1924), p. 912.
Alte und neue Zeit im Hamburger Hafen	Old and New Times in Hamburg Harbor	1924	Oil on canvas, dimensions unknown	1924 – Reproduced in Jugend: Münchner illustrierte Wochenschrift für Kunst und Leben, vol. 29, no. 36 (25 October 1924), pp. 908–909.
Hafenbild aus Hamburg	Harbor Scene from Hamburg	1924	Oil on canvas, dimensions unknown	1924 – Reproduced in Jugend: Münchner illustrierte Wochenschrift für Kunst und Leben, vol. 29, no. 36 (25 October 1924), p. 909.
Enten auf einem Teich	Ducks on a Pond	1925	Oil on canvas, dimensions unknown	14 May 1925 – Reproduced in Völkischer Beobachter (title not recorded).
Rinder im Fluss	Cattle in a River	1925	Oil on canvas, dimensions unknown	14 May 1925 – Reproduced in Völkischer Beobachter (title not recorded).
Abend in den Bergen	Evening in the Mountains	1925	Oil painting, dimensions unknown	1925 – Reproduced in Brakls Moderne Kunsthandlung (Munich: Brakls Kunsthaus). Title listed in catalog; original painting unlocated.
Unbetitelte Schiffsszene	Untitled Ship Scene	1925	Oil on canvas, dimensions unknown	14 May 1925 – Reproduced in Völkischer Beobachter (image only); title not identified.
Im Hamburger Hafen	In the Port of Hamburg	1925	Oil on canvas, 64 × 85.5 cm (original); postcard reproduction	1925 – Published as postcard by Franz Hanfstaengl, Munich. Original painting dimensions recorded as 64 × 85.5 cm.
Viehweide	Cattle Pasture	c. 1925	Oil on wood panel, H. 40 cm × W. 60 cm (signed)	1925 – Listed in Hamburg auction catalogue Versteigerung von Gemälden und Kunstgegenständen von Meistern Erster Rangklasse, 18–20 March 1925, lot 63.
Ein schattiger Winkel	A Shady Corner	c.1925	Medium and dimensions unknown	Listed in Brakl's Moderne Kunsthandlung (Munich), cat. no. 545, priced 300 RM.
Frühlingsweide	Spring Pasture	c.1925	Medium and dimensions unknown	Listed in Brakl's Moderne Kunsthandlung (Munich), cat. no. 546, priced 750 RM.
Abend in den Bergen	Evening in the Mountains	c.1925	Medium and dimensions unknown	Listed in Brakl's Moderne Kunsthandlung (Munich), cat. no. 547, priced 650 RM.
Kiesfuhrwerk am Wasser	Gravel Cart at the Water	c.1925	Medium and dimensions unknown	Listed in Brakl's Moderne Kunsthandlung (Munich), cat. no. 549, priced 700 RM.
Fuhrwerk im Walde	Wagon in the Forest	c.1925	Medium and dimensions unknown	Listed in Brakl's Moderne Kunsthandlung (Munich), cat. no. 550, priced 700 RM.
Untitled Cattle in a river	Cattle in a river	1925	Oil on canvas, dimensions unknown	1925 – Reproduced in Völkischer Beobachter, 14 May 1925 (title not recorded). (Image reproduced in this article's gallery).
Untitled Sailing Ship Scene	Untitled sailing ship scene	1925	Oil on canvas, dimensions unknown	Private collection.
Weidende Kühe	Grazing Cows	1926	Oil on canvas, 50 × 70 cm	1926 – Listed in Felix Fleischhauer auction catalogue, Stuttgart, 1–2 December 1926, lot 522. Signed W. Tiedjen.
Tränkende Kühe	Drinking Cows	1926	Oil on canvas, 70 × 100 cm	1926 – Listed in Felix Fleischhauer auction catalogue, Stuttgart, 1–2 December 1926, lot 523. Signed W. Tiedjen.
Ziegen auf der Weide im Hochgebirge	Goats Grazing in the High Mountains	1926	Oil on canvas, 74 × 92 cm	1926 – Listed in Felix Fleischhauer auction catalogue, Stuttgart, 1–2 December 1926, lot 524. Signed W. Tiedjen.
Im Hamburger Hafen	In Hamburg Harbor	1926	Oil on canvas, 45 × 63 cm	1926 – Rudolf Bangel auction, Frankfurt (5 Oct 1926), lot 225; signed lower right “W. Tiedjen”. Catalog description: two tugs at full steam and a motorboat crossing a lightly choppy harbor surface.
Die Zugspitze von Garmisch aus gesehen	The Zugspitze as Seen from Garmisch	1926	Oil on canvas, H. 70 cm × W. 100 cm	1926 – Listed in Carl F. Schlüter Autumn Art Auction Catalogue, Hamburg, 26–29 October 1926, lot 325.
Hühnerhof	Poultry Yard	1926	Oil on canvas, 37 × 49 cm	1926 – Listed in ‘’Alte und Neue Kunst: Auction catalogue of paintings by first masters’’, Munich (15 September 1926), lot 2228. Signed “W. Tiedjen.”; 1926 – Listed in Felix Fleischhauer auction catalogue, Stuttgart, 19–20 October 1926, lot 343.
Ziegen auf der Weide im Hochgebirge	Goats in the Mountain Pasture	1926	Oil on canvas, 74 × 93 cm	1926 – Listed in Felix Fleischhauer auction catalogue, Stuttgart, 19–20 October 1926, lot 344.
Holsteinische Viehweide	Holstein Cattle Pasture	1926	Oil on canvas, dimensions unknown	1926 – Exhibited at the Münchener Kunstausstellung, Maximilianeum (Münchener Künstler-Genossenschaft).
Wolfhund im seichten Wasser watend	Wolfhound Wading in Shallow Water	1927	Oil on canvas, 65 × 94 cm	1927 – Listed in Hugo Helbing auction catalogue, Galerie Helbing, Munich, 10 February 1927, lot 279. Catalog description: Depicts a wolfhound wading in shallow water.
Pferde beim Halt in Hochgebirgslandschaft	Horses Resting in a High-Mountain Landscape	1927	Oil on canvas, 76 × 110 cm	1927 – Listed in Dr. Störi, Kunstsalon Zürich auction catalogue, I. Gemälde, Möbel und Antiquitäten – Sammlung Dr. Sch., II. Ostasiatica-Sammlung R., Zürich, 23–24 September 1927, lot 73.
Truthühner und Hahn	Turkeys and Rooster (gathered around the feeding bowl)	1927	Oil on canvas, 62 × 42 cm	1927 – Listed in Math. Lempertz Art Auction: Paintings by Modern Masters from Various Collections (Cologne, 18 May 1927), lot 171. Signed “W. Tiedjen.”
Sommertag an der Ostsee	Summer Day on the Baltic Sea	1928	Postcard reproduction (part), dimensions unknown	1928 – Published as special art insert in Daheim magazine to promote the Internationale Press Exhibition in Cologne (Internationale Presse-Ausstellung).
Sommertag an der Ostsee	Summer Day on the Baltic Sea	1928	Postcard reproduction	1928 – Published in Daheim magazine as a special insert to promote the Internationale Press Exhibition, Cologne. (Image reproduced in this article's gallery).
Kühe am Teich	Cows by the Pond	1928	Oil on canvas, 50 × 65 cm	1928 – Offered at auction, Stuttgart (Felix Fleischhauer sale catalogue).
Gebirge	Mountains	1928	Oil on canvas, 50 × 65 cm	1928 – Offered at auction, Stuttgart (Felix Fleischhauer sale catalogue).
Heidelandschaft	Heath Landscape	1929	Medium and dimensions unknown	1929 – Listed in Schwanck Collection – Japanese woodcuts 16th to 18th centuries; Paintings from Hamburg private collections, Carl F. Schlüter auction (Hamburg, 5–6 February 1929), lot 101.
Kühe im Bach vor waldiger Anhöhe	Cows in the Stream Before a Wooded Slope	1930	Oil on canvas, 42 × 61 cm	1930 – Listed in Hugo Helbing Catalog (Frankfurt am Main, 27/28 May 1930), Lot 420.
Landschaft mit Kühen	Landscape with Cows	1930	Oil on canvas, 46 × 67 cm	1930 – Listed in Hugo Helbing Catalog (Frankfurt am Main, 27/28 May 1930), Lot 421.
Toter Hahn	Dead Rooster	1930	Oil on canvas, dimensions unknown	1930 – Listed in Deutsche Kunstausstellung München 1930 im Glaspalast, official catalogue.
Enten	Ducks	1931	Medium not specified, 50 × 60 cm	1931 – Listed in Alte und Neue Kunst GmbH (Munich) catalogue, *Ölgemälde, Aquarelle, Pastelle u.a.: Münchener Künstler*, 16–18 December 1931, lot 295.
Fischerfrauen	Fisherwomen	1931	Pastel on paper, 42 × 50 cm, silver frame	1931 – Listed in Ölgemälde, Aquarelle, Pastelle u.a.: Münchner Künstler des 19. und 20. Jahrhunderts, Alte und Neue Kunst GmbH, Munich (18–19 November 1931), lot 153.
Kühe auf der Weide in einem Pferch	Cows in a Paddock	1931	Oil on canvas, 70 × 100 cm	1931 – Listed in Hugo Helbing auction catalogue, Galerie Helbing, Munich, 10 March 1931, lot 126. Catalog description: Depicts cows in a fenced paddock in bright sunlight, with mountain ranges in the background.
Hamburger Hafen	Hamburg Harbor	1931	Oil on canvas, 44 × 62 cm, signed	1930 – Listed in Sammlung F. Dörfler und Beiträge aus anderem Besitz: Bücher und ausländische Literatur, Kunst- und Kulturgeschichte, Biographien, Memoiren, ... (Berlin, Max Perl, 14 April 1930), Lot 600.; 1931 – Auctioned at Max Perl, Berlin (30 March 1931, Katalog Nr. 1621). Sold 60 RM.
Ruhende Enten	Resting Ducks	1931	Oil on canvas, dimensions unknown	1931 – Exhibited at the Münchener Kunstausstellung, Glaspalast (Münchener Künstler-Genossenschaft).
Abend am Kanal	Evening at the Canal	1931	Oil on canvas, dimensions unknown	1931 – Exhibited at the Alingspor-Ausstellung (Horst Stobbe, Munich). Reviewed in Münchener Neueste Nachrichten: Wirtschaftsblatt, alpine und Sport-Zeitung, Theater- und Kunst-Chronik, 26 Feb. 1931. The critic highlighted its harmonious twilight effect and atmospheric mood.
Kanalszene	Canal Scene	1931	Oil on canvas, dimensions unknown	1931 – Exhibited at the Alingspor-Ausstellung (Horst Stobbe, Munich). Reviewed in Münchener Neueste Nachrichten, 26 Feb. 1931. Noted as one of the most striking works in the exhibition.
Kliff-Landschaft	Cliff Landscape	1931	Oil on canvas, dimensions unknown	1931 – Exhibited at the Alingspor-Ausstellung (Horst Stobbe, Munich). Reviewed in Münchener Neueste Nachrichten, 26 Feb. 1931. Praised for atmospheric density and color strength.
Abend im Hafen	Evening in the Harbor	1931	Oil on canvas, dimensions unknown	1931 – Exhibited at the Alingspor-Ausstellung (Horst Stobbe, Munich). Reviewed in Münchener Neueste Nachrichten, 26 Feb. 1931. Mentioned for its lively brushwork and harmonious tone.
Erntezeit	Harvest Time	1933	Oil on canvas, dimensions unknown	1933 – Listed in Staatliche Kunstausstellung München 1933: Amtlicher Katalog (Official Catalogue), Münchener Künstlergenossenschaft, p. 43.
Marine: Holland	Marine: Holland	1934	Oil on canvas, 80 × 95 cm	1934 – Listed in Versteigerung / Kunsthaus Heinrich Hahn (Frankfurt am Main, 4–5 December 1934), lot 100. Described as “North Sea coast with departing fishing boats, on the shore a group of fishermen and women.” Signed “W. Tiedjen 10.”
Schäfer mit Herde	Shepherd with Flock	1935	Oil on canvas, 79 × 90 cm	1935 – Listed in Hugo Helbing auction catalogue, Munich, 27–29 May 1935, lot 226. Catalog description: Shows a shepherd driving a flock along an avenue; sunlight falls through the trees, brightly illuminating the animals.
Frühlingsweide	Spring Pasture	1935	Oil on canvas, 88 × 143 cm	1935 – Listed in Galerie Helbing auction catalogue, Munich, 10–11 July 1935, lot 114. Catalog description: Depicts cows grazing in young, lush green pasture; blue sky with scattered white clouds overhead.
Entenweiher	Duck Pond	1936	Oil on canvas, 51 × 70 cm (signed and dated lower right)	17 Mar 1988 – Auctioned at Neumeister, Munich, Varia A40, Lot 2653. Listed estimate: 800 DM. Realized: 3,300 DM.
Fischerhafen an der Elbe	Fishing Harbour on the Elbe	1937	—	13 Jan 1937 – Registered with the U.S. Copyright Office, Catalogue of Copyright Entries, Class H–K (1938), p. 2072, entry K 36106.
Barnyard Scene	Barnyard Scene	1938	Oil on panel, 16 × 26 in.	1938 – Listed in Paintings of Various Schools sale (American Art Association, Anderson Galleries, New York), Lot 16. Catalogue describes: “A turkey cock and his hen overawe the approaching rooster and his family. An attractive genre scene; signed at the right.”
Hamburger Hafen	Hamburg Harbor	1938	Oil on canvas, H. 68 cm × W. 92 cm	1938 – Listed in Kunsthaus Lempertz (Cologne) auction catalogue, Paintings by Old and Modern Masters from Private and Museum Collections, 12 November 1938, lot 312. Catalog description: Depicts Hamburg harbor with a large three-masted steamer at center, surrounded by smaller ferries and other vessels. The atmosphere is described as sunny with slightly hazy air.; 1939 – Listed again in Kunsthaus Lempertz (Cologne) auction catalogue, Neuzeitliche und alte Gemälde, antike Möbel, Orientteppiche, 19–22 May 1939, lot 179. Description repeats: larger three-masted steamer in the center, smaller ferries and other boats around, sunny hazy light.
Sieben Enten	Seven Ducks	1939	Oil on canvas, 60 × 80 cm (signed and dated lower left)	20 Sep 1989 – Auctioned at Neumeister Kunstauktionen, Munich, Auktion Nr. 252, Lot 771. Recorded in Bildindex der Kunst & Architektur.
Tierstück. Ziege mit Zicklein	Animal Piece: Goat with Kid	1939	Oil on cardboard, 38 × 73 cm (black frame)	1939 – Listed in Kunst- und Auktionshaus Franz A. Menna (Cologne) catalogue, 9–11 February 1939, lot 793. Catalog description: Depicts a goat with a young kid, in a black frame.
Hirte mit Hund	Shepherd with Dog	1939	Oil on canvas, 48.5 × 65.5 cm	1939 – Sold at Adolf Weinmüller auction, Munich (15–16 June 1939), lot 867. Signed “W. Tiedjen.” Limit 80 RM, estimate 150 RM, hammer price 180 RM.
Tierstück. Enten am Weiher	Animal Piece: Ducks at the Pond	1939	Oil on canvas, 50 × 70 cm (in black frame)	1939 – Listed in Franz A. Menna Art and Auction House (Cologne) catalogue, Paintings by old and new masters: private and partly Jewish ownership, 12–15 May 1939, lot 1234. Catalog description: Depicts ducks at a pond, in a black frame.
Hamburger Hafen	Hamburg Harbor	1939	Oil on canvas, 48.5 × 62.5 cm	1939 – Offered at Adolf Weinmüller auction, Munich (15–16 June 1939), lot 867. Signed “W. Tiedjen.”
Schäfer mit Schafherde	Shepherd with Flock of Sheep	1940	Oil on canvas, 90 × 145 cm	1940 – Listed in Kunsthaus Heinrich Hahn auction catalogue, Frankfurt am Main, 3–5 December 1940, lot 109. Catalog description: Large painting showing a shepherd with a flock of sheep in an open landscape, noted as “breathing the atmosphere of a typically German landscape.”
Mühle am Fluss	Mill on the River	1940	Oil on canvas, 60 × 80 cm	1940 – Sold at Adolf Weinmüller auction, Munich (11–12 April 1940), lot 446. Signed “W. Tiedjen.” Consignor listed as “Leo”; buyer recorded as “Stadt Galerie.” Likely Munich. Limit 150 RM, estimate 300 RM, hammer price 450 RM.
Mittenwald bei Föhnstimmung	Mittenwald in Föhn Weather	1940 (signed)	Oil on canvas, 42 × 62.5 cm	1940 – Listed in Adolf Weinmüller auction, Munich (11–12 April 1940), lot 447. Signed “W. Tiedjen.” Limit 150 RM, estimate 300 RM.
Bauernbursche zwischen zwei Kälbern	Farm Boy between Two Calves	1942	Oil on canvas, 55 × 67 cm	1942 – Listed in Adolf Weinmüller auction, Munich (2–3 July 1942), lot 579.

== Additional Works in Private Circulation ==
The following works by Willy Tiedjen have been documented through private ownership or online listings but are not yet verified through catalogues, auction houses, or institutional records.

Image Title (German)	English translation	First recorded	Medium / dimensions	Activity / notes
Frühling b. Garmisch	Spring near Garmisch	-	Oil on canvas, ca. 85 × 66 cm (signed)	Private collection.
Winter am Bergsee	Winter at the Mountain Lake	1916	Oil painting, ca. 112 x 82 cm (signed)	Observed in an online sale listing, Oct 2025.
Schäfer mit seiner Herde auf einer Lichtung	Shepherd with His Flock in a Clearing	1921	Oil on canvas, 83 × 73 cm (signed)	Observed in an online sale listing, Oct 2025.
Kühe stehen im Flussbett	Cows Standing in the Riverbed	1928	Oil painting, ca. 100 x 85 cm (signed)	Observed in an online sale listing, Oct 2025.
