= Estrella de Chile (ship) =

British cargo ship (wrecked 1888)

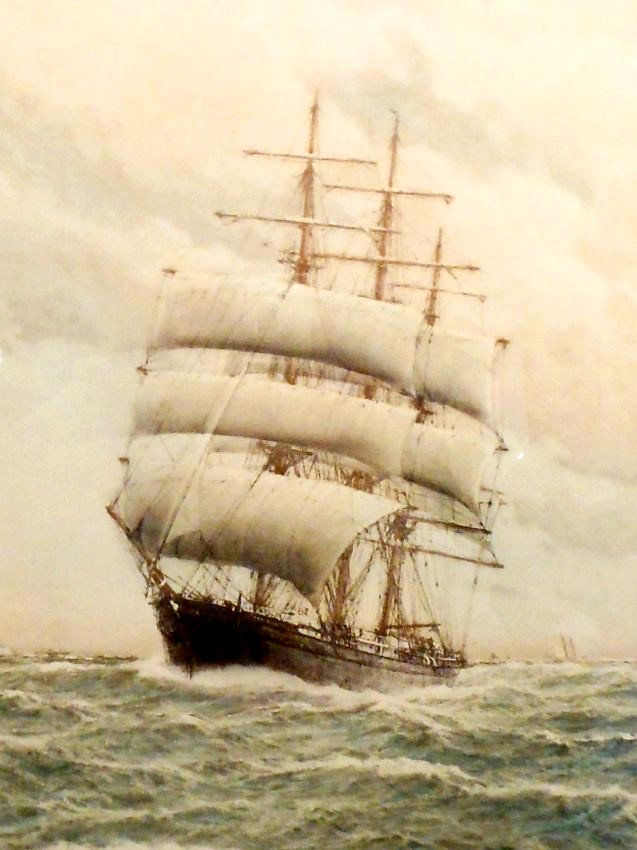
- "Estrella de Chile" of Glasgow April 1881, Hugo Schnars-Alquist, 1909. (cropped)

History

United Kingdom
- Name: Estrella de Chile
- Operator: Glen Line
- Port of registry: Glasgow
- Route: Glasgow – Chile
- Builder: Laurence Hill & Co. Port Glasgow
- Launched: 1867
- Out of service: 1888
- Home port: Glasgow
- Fate: Wrecked in the Solway Firth, 25 November 1888

General characteristics
- Type: Iron Sailing Vessel 3 Masted Barque
- Tonnage: 582 grt / 556 nrt
- Length: 171.5 ft (52.3 m)
- Beam: 28.1 ft (8.6 m)
- Draught: 17 ft (5.2 m)
- Complement: 15

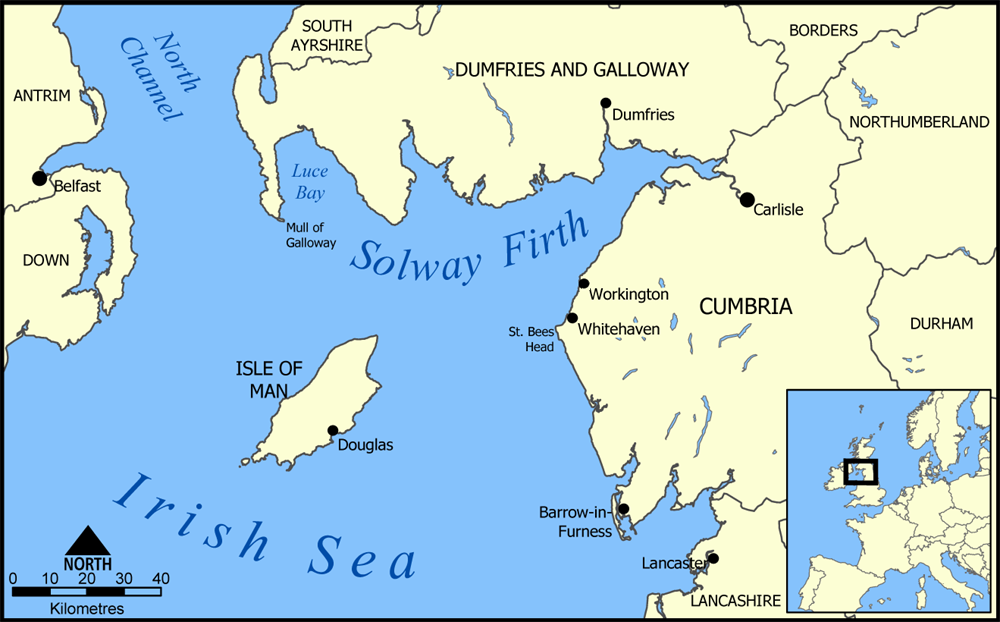
Map of Solway Firth

Estrella de Chile (Star of Chile) was an iron three-masted barque of the Glen Line built to ply the route between Glasgow, Liverpool, and Chile via Cape Horn. The ship was wrecked in the Solway Firth on 25 November 1888 after getting into difficulties when the master misjudged the ship's position. The first mate drowned, but the rest of the crew were rescued by a lifeboat.

== Construction ==
The Estrella de Chile was an iron three-masted barque built at Laurence Hill & Co, Port Glasgow. She was launched on 1 October 1867 for Alan C. Gow & Co., of Glasgow. The first owners were James McGregor, Leonard Gow and Laurence Hill, all of Glasgow. On 29 September 1868, ownership changed to McGregor & Gow.

The ship was built to ply the route between Glasgow, Liverpool, and Chile via Cape Horn, hence the name Star of Chile, but it travelled other routes including to Singapore.

== Wrecked ==
The ship was wrecked in the Solway Firth on 25 November 1888 while carrying a cargo of steel rails from Whitehaven, Cumbria, to Rosario, Argentina. The ship first became stranded on a bank to the north of the Workington Bank; but floating free it later ran aground on the Robin Rigg Sand on which it became embedded. As the position worsened, and the ship filled with water, the crew sought refuge in the rigging and the first mate drowned after being knocked from the mizzen mast. The rest of the crew were rescued by the Maryport lifeboat which landed them safely there.

On 18 and 19 December 1888, the court of enquiry into the wreck found that the master, James Dorward, had misjudged his position. However, the enquiry did not recommend the suspension of his Master mariner certificate in deference to his record, diligence in the performance of his duties in difficult waters, and his ship having been cast off in a less than ideal position by the tug that towed it from Whitehaven.
