= James Dorward =

James Dorward (born 1841) was a Scottish mariner who was the master of the barque Estrella de Chile when she was wrecked in the Solway Firth on 25 November 1888 after getting into difficulties when Dorward misjudged the ship's position.

== Early life ==
James Dorward was born in Fife, Scotland, in 1841.

== Career ==
Dorward received his certificate of competency as a master (No. 30,510) in Dundee in 1867. He is listed in the Index to the Captains Registers of Lloyd's of London (Guildhall Library Ms. 18567) from that year until 1908.

In 1888, he was the master of the barque Estrella de Chile of the Glen Line, having been in that position for about four and a half years, when she was wrecked in the Solway Firth on 25 November 1888 while carrying a cargo of steel rails from Whitehaven, Cumbria, to Rosario, Argentina. The ship first became stranded on a bank to the north of the Workington Bank but floated free and later ran aground on the Robin Rigg Sand from which it could not free itself. As the position worsened, and the ship filled with water, the crew sought refuge in the rigging and the first mate drowned after being knocked from the mizzen mast. The rest of the crew were rescued by the Maryport lifeboat who landed them safely there.

The court of enquiry into the wreck, of 18 & 19 December 1888, found that Dorward misjudged his position but did not recommend the suspension of his certificate in deference to his record, diligence in the performance of his duties in difficult waters, and his ship having been cast off in a less than ideal position by the tug that towed the ship from Whitehaven.
