= MV Glenartney (1915) =

British cargo ship

History

United Kingdom
- Name: launched as Montezuma; renamed Glenartney
- Namesake: Montezuma; Glen Artney, Perthshire
- Owner: Glen Line
- Operator: McGregor, Gow & Co Ltd
- Port of registry: Glasgow
- Builder: Harland & Wolff, Irvine
- Yard number: 467
- Launched: 1915
- Completed: 1916
- Identification: UK official number 137812; code letters JMQC
- Fate: Sunk by torpedo, 5–6 February 1918

General characteristics
- Type: Cargo ship
- Tonnage: 7,237 GRT, 4,593 NRT
- Length: 435.9 ft (132.9 m)
- Beam: 55.3 ft (16.9 m)
- Depth: 35.2 ft (10.7 m)
- Installed power: 656 NHP
- Propulsion: 2 × four-stroke single-acting diesel; 2 × screws
- Speed: 11 1/2 knots (21 km/h)

MV Glenartney was a Glen Line cargo twin-screw motor ship that was launched in Scotland in 1915 as Montezuma, renamed Glenartney when she changed owners, and sunk by a U-boat in 1918.

== Building ==
Elder, Dempster & Co ordered the ship from Harland & Wolff, who built her at Irvine, North Ayrshire. She was launched in 1915 as Montezuma. While she was being fitted out, Glen Line bought her and renamed her Glenartney. She was completed in 1916.

The ship's main engines were a pair of Burmeister & Wain four-stroke single-acting diesels, probably built under licence by Harland and Wolff. They were rated at 656 NHP, drove a pair of screws, and gave her a speed of about 11 1/2 knots (21 km/h).

== Service ==
On 26 August 1916 Glenartney suffered a serious fire in her holds in Singapore.

In February 1918 Glenartney was in the Mediterranean sailing from Singapore to London. On the night of 5–6 February she was about 30 nautical miles (56 km) northeast of Cape Bon, Tunisia when the Imperial German Navy U-boat SM UC-54 hit her with a torpedo. Glenartney sank with the loss of two members of her crew.
