= Glenavon (1881) =

British cargo ship

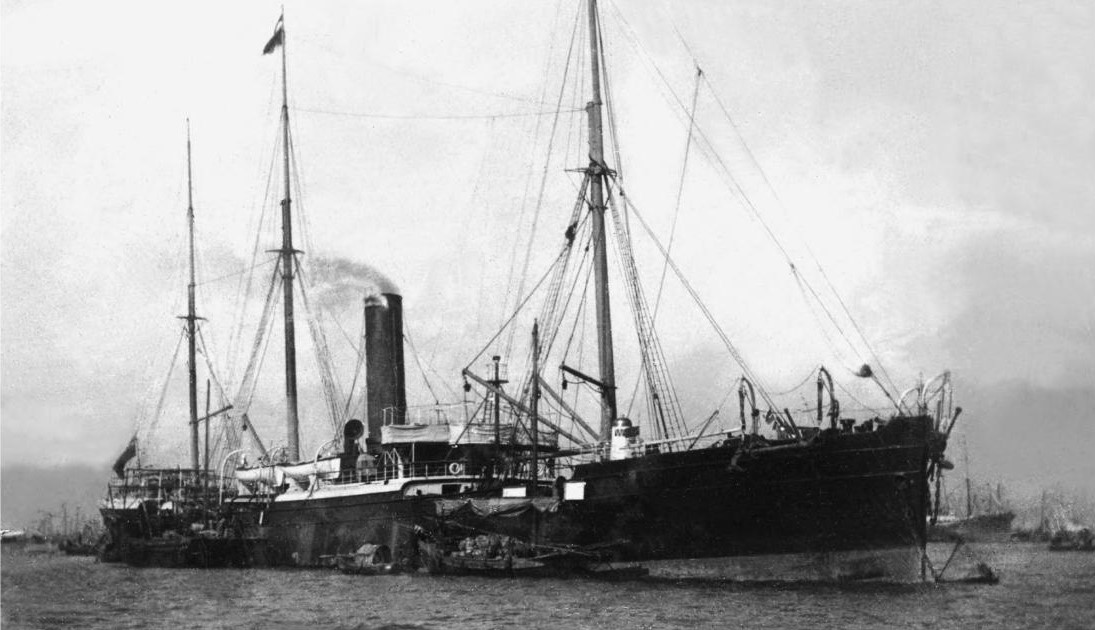
The Glenavon at anchor in Japan, 1898, not long before her sinking in December 1898.

The Glenavon was a British iron cargo ship of the Glen Line that was wrecked off the coast of China in 1898. Four people, but not the master, lost their lives in the wreck. The master had his licence suspended for one year.

== Construction ==
The Glenavon was built at the Middleton Yard of the London & Glasgow Engineering & Iron Shipbuilding Co. of Govan, and launched on 16 February 1881. The first owner was McGregor, Gow & Co., of Glasgow. It was the second ship of that name owned by the Glen Line, the first being an 1868 barque.

== Wrecked ==
The Glenavon was wrecked on the Linting Rock in the Sa Mun group, off the China coast, on 29 December 1898 while en route from Japan to the United Kingdom via Hong Kong. The chief officer, quartermaster, second steward, and No. 3 fireman all lost their lives. The passengers and the remainder of the crew were saved.

A court of enquiry held in Hong Kong in January 1899 found that the master, William Pithie, did not take proper care in fixing his position and therefore embarked on a dangerous course that was the principal cause of the wrecking. It recommended that his certificate be suspended for a period of one year. The court also expressed the opinion that had the ship's boats remained alongside as they were ordered to do, rather than making for Hong Kong as they did, then the four lives lost might have been saved.
