= William Pithie =

Scottish mariner born in the 19th century

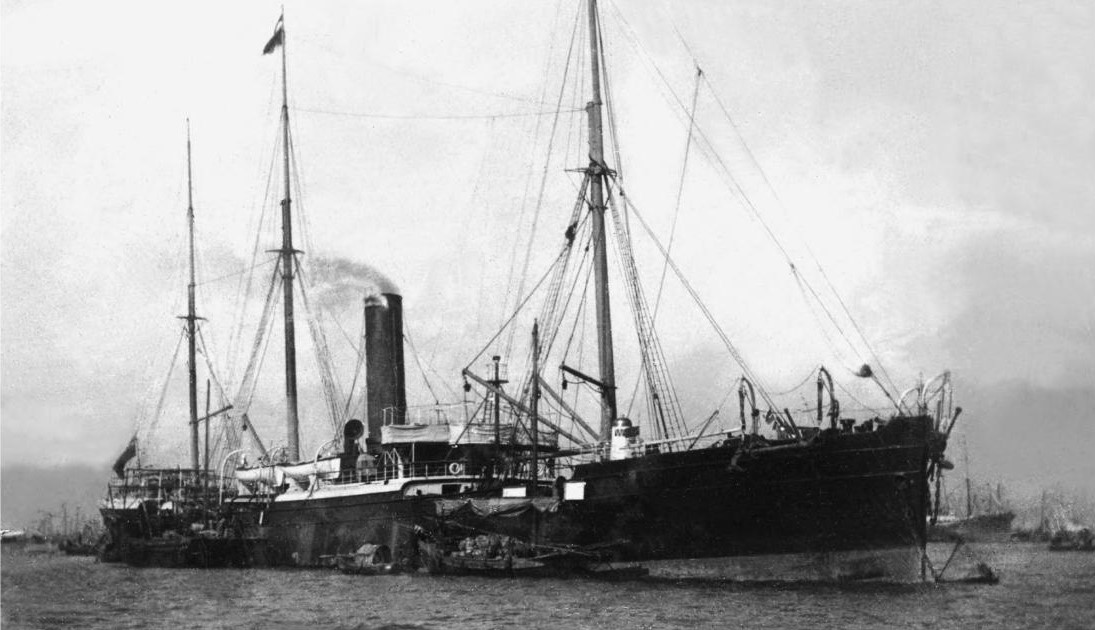
The Glenavon at anchor in Japan, 1898, not long before her sinking in December 1898.

William Pithie (born 1859) was a Scottish mariner who was master of the Glenavon when it was wrecked off the coast of China in 1898. Four people, but not Pithie, lost their lives in the wreck. Pithie had his licence suspended for one year.

== Early life ==
William Pithie was born in Aberdeen in 1859.

== Career ==
In 1898 he was the master (certificate number 07101) of the Glenavon, a steamer of the Glen Line that was built in Govan, and launched in 1881.

The Glenavon was wrecked on the Linting Rock in the Sa Mun group, off the China coast, on 29 December 1898 while en route from Japan to the United Kingdom via Hong Kong. The chief officer, quartermaster, second steward, and No. 3 fireman all lost their lives. The passengers and the remainder of the crew were saved.

A court of enquiry held in Hong Kong in January 1899 found that Pithie did not take proper care in fixing his position and therefore embarked on a dangerous course that was the principal cause of the wrecking. It recommended that his certificate be suspended for a period of one year. The court also expressed the opinion that had the ship's boats remained alongside as they were ordered to do, rather than making for Hong Kong as they did, then the four lives lost might have been saved.
