= Hans Bohrdt =

German painter

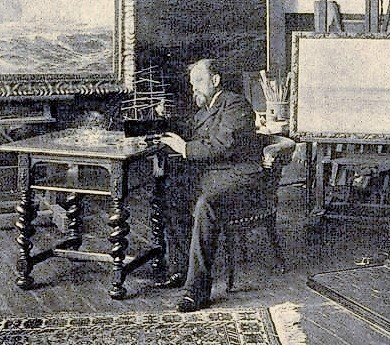
- Hans Bohrdt in his art studio, c1900
- Born: Hans Bohrdt; 11 February 1857
- Died: 19 December 1945 (aged 88)
- Occupation: Artist

Hans Bohrdt (11 February 1857 – 19 December 1945) was a German artist. He was a self-taught painter who would later go on to give private lessons to Kaiser Wilhelm II. German Kaiser Wilhelm II took a liking to Bohrdt and would fund all of his projects, which were often nationalistic in nature. In 1915 Bohrdt created his most famous illustration which is called "The Last Man". The image shows a German navy sailor holding up a German flag as his ship sinks during the Battle of the Falkland Islands because he would rather go down with the ship than surrender. "The Last Man" would become one of the most widely recognized propaganda images used during the war to inspire courage. Bohrdt was accepted into the Imperial Yacht Club in Kiel. In 1906 the Kaiser granted Bohrdt a spacious villa in Berlin. After World War I, Bohrdt made a living drawing maritime postcards, book illustrations, magazines, and supplied images for newspaper articles.

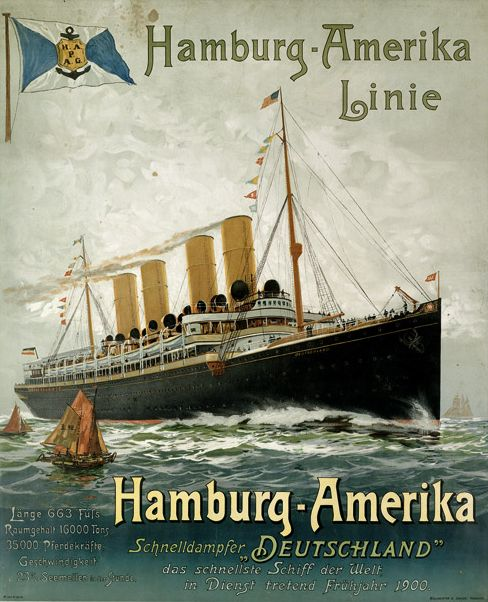
Illustration by Hans Bohrdt, 1900

== Personal life ==
Bohrdt was born to a comfortably well-off middle-class family. His parents were Adolph Eduard Bohrdt and Rosalie Pauline Szymkowski, and he was one of 7 siblings (Paul Reinhold, Albert Anton, Maria Ann, Clare Antonie, Johanna Antonie and Carl Eduard). His father was a civil servant in the legal department of the Imperial administration.

Bohrdt's love for the sea began when he was 15 after visiting the port of Hamburg.

Bohrdt lived and worked in Berlin, Germany, in the Dahlem district. He married Anna Louise Cook in Berlin Rixdorf in 1898. Together they had three children who would later leave and live in separate places around the world, the oldest stayed in Hamburg and the son moved out to Buenos Aires.

Two world wars not only resulted in the decimation of Bohrdt's family but in the number of his works as well. Many are still unaccounted for, including his best-known painting, "Der letzte Mann" ("The Last Man"; 1915), which has been lost since 1924. Innumerable reproductions, both cheap and more lavish, have been reproduced from this work and it has been widely employed for various political purposes.

== Career ==
While many smaller nations could point to a tradition of marine painting stretching back over a period of several hundred years, Germany can only be said to have become seriously engaged in this genre after the country became united in 1871. Marine painting was a young form of art in Germany and came to be "the heartland" of the country. For the art schools of the inland cities of Karlsruhe, Dresden and Berlin, landscape painting provided the backbone of their curriculum. Nevertheless, the study of seascapes was included on their syllabus. Bohrdt was to a large extent an autodidact, but he had studied sporadically at the Academy of Fine Arts in Berlin. There, he soon tired of drawing from plaster copies of more or less classical subjects, finding this way of learning to be more of a hindrance than a help within his chosen field.

Bohrdt became a bright star in that firmament of marine painters that shone so brightly during the Wilhelmine era. During the 1880s the younger Kaiser had purchased some of Bohrdt's paintings, both for his own private collection and for public buildings. Bohrdt became a painter à la mode, and was praised by no less a person than Adolf Rosenberg, the leading critic of the day, which lead to Bohrdt forming a personal friendship with the Kaiser himself. He was showered with decorations and in 1898 was awarded an honorary doctorate. By 1904, his work had begun to assume a somewhat plodding predictability, and an art critic who had earlier been benevolently inclined towards Bohrdt now observed of one of his exhibitions that it "contained many paintings but little art".

He often used tempera for his illustrations, as this medium is particularly suited for reproduction as a print, and he was able to hold his ground for a surprisingly long time against the remorseless advance of photography and the camera.

During the decade prior to World War I, the German Merchant Marine had grown to a size only second to that of the United Kingdom. Not only the vessels themselves, proudly bearing three or four funnels, but even the cargoes and the passenger, were depicted in order to publicize the various shipping lines. Commissions were not long in coming.

== World War I ==
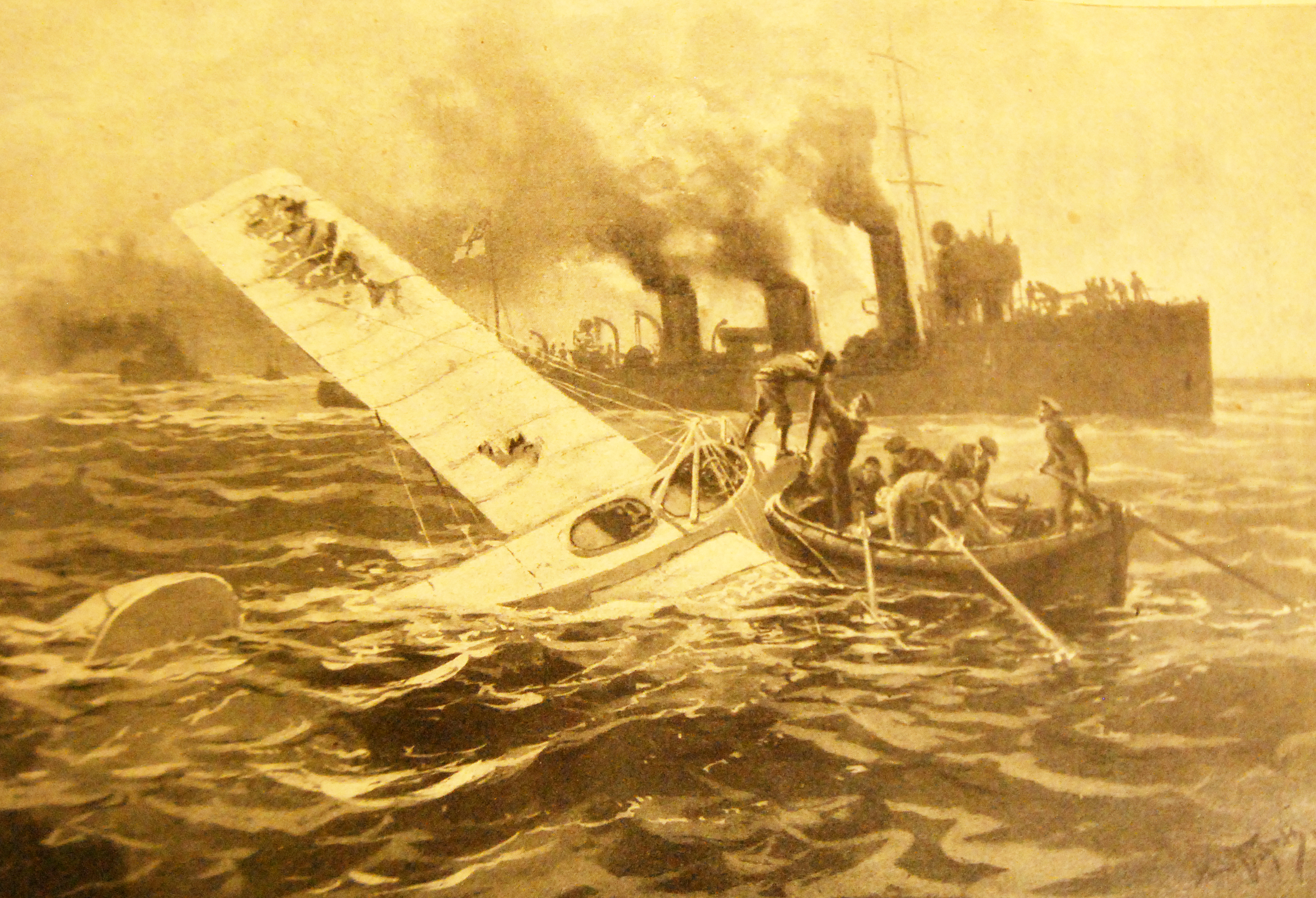
Patrolling the sky for English flyers

His art had by now become a part of the propaganda apparatus in a Germany resolved on becoming a world power, and in which the Navy was but one of the essential elements. To quote Pompey, and probably Herr Professor Hans Bohrdt, "Navigate necesse est, vivere non".("to sail is necessary, to live is not") (Note: Paraphrase of navigare necesse est, vivere non est necesse ("to sail is necessary; to live is not necessary"); attributed by Plutarch to Gnaeus Pompeius Magnus (Pompey), who, during a severe storm, commanded sailors to bring food from Africa to Rome. Translated from Plutarch's Greek "πλεῖν ἀνάγκη, ζῆν οὐκ ἀνάγκη") Apart from promoting the interests of the Navy and the major shipping lines, his work was established and appreciated amongst a wide circle of affluent buyers. As a member of the Imperial Yacht Club, he was able to exhibit his work, and to obtain work as an illustrator for various Yearbooks. Until the outbreak of the war, artists had been given the opportunity to accompany the Fleet on its worldwide cruises and when security restrictions no longer allowed this, Bohrdt felt that he had lost his connection with the sea. It was a very hard time for him. It was, he said, "like being a Red Indian in New York."

The outcome of the war resulted in the reduction of the merchant fleet, the confiscation of ships and consequently no more commissions. All that remained was for Bohrdt to be a painter of nostalgic picture postcards.

During the 1920s, the recovery of the Merchant Marine ushered in new commissions for the artist, but he never really managed to be again in step with the spirit of the times. He died in a retirement home on 19 December 1945.

== Memorial exhibition ==
In remembrance of the fiftieth anniversary of his death in 1945, the Museum arranged an exhibition of his work. In addition to those of Bohrdt's paintings, posters, prints and reproductions that it holds in its own collection, the Museum gathered a number of works from both public and private sources. The aim of the organizers was to provide a picture as possible of the last of the great marine painters. The technical virtuosity of this artist who so dearly loved ships and the sea is revealed in all its forms, and considerable attention is given to his skill as an illustrator.

== Institute of Prehistoric Archaeology ==
The Institute of Prehistoric Archaeology is in villa, which was built in 1906, of Hans Bohrdt. As a historical discipline the subject of prehistoric archaeology is concerned with the study of artefacts and monuments and their cultural and historical significance. Following the canon of subjects relating to archaeology offered at Freie Universität Berlin, the subject matter deals with archaeological remains that were discovered in Europe through excavations and surveys dated to the time span from the emergence of humankind to the medieval period. Particular emphasis is placed upon the study of the development of sedentism during the Neolithic period (c. 8000 B.C.) until the migration period.

== See also ==
- List of German painters
