= Nigel Dorward =

Zimbabwean cricketer (born 1966)

Personal information
- Full name: Nigel Douglas Dorward
- Born: 4 February 1966 (age 60); Salisbury, Rhodesia
- Batting: Right-handed
- Bowling: Slow left-arm orthodox

Domestic team information
- Years: Team
- 1994/95–1995/96: Mashonaland Country Districts

Career statistics
Competition	First-class
Matches	2
Runs scored	38
Batting average	9.50
100s/50s	–/–
Top score	23
Balls bowled	–
Wickets	–
Bowling average	–
5 wickets in innings	–
10 wickets in match	–
Best bowling	–
Catches/stumpings	2/–
- Source: Cricinfo, 20 October 2012

Nigel Douglas Dorward (born 4 February 1966) was a Zimbabwean cricketer. He was a right-handed batsman and a left-arm slow bowler who played for Mashonaland County Districts. He was born in Salisbury (now Harare).

Dorward's debut came during the Logan Cup competition of 1994/95, though, batting at number one, he was unable to make much of an imprint on the scorecard.

Dorward's second and final first-class appearance came in the following season, and while he scored 23 and 3 with the bat, he did not play another first-class game.
