= Carl Becker (marine painter) =

German marine artist (1862–1926)

Carl Emil Rudolf Ludwig Becker
- Born: August 31, 1862
- Died: February 12, 1926 (aged 63)
- Education: Kunstakademie Düsseldorf
- Known for: Marine painting

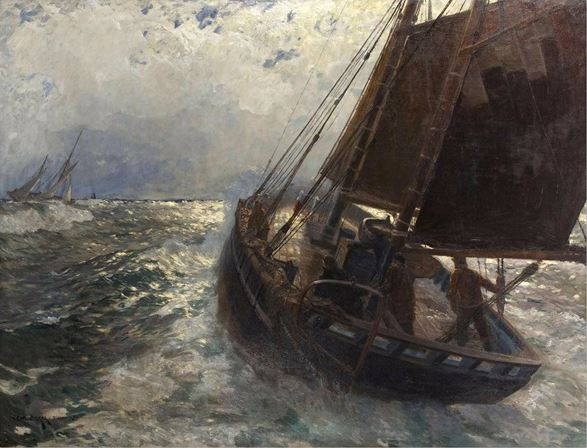
A Cutter Underway

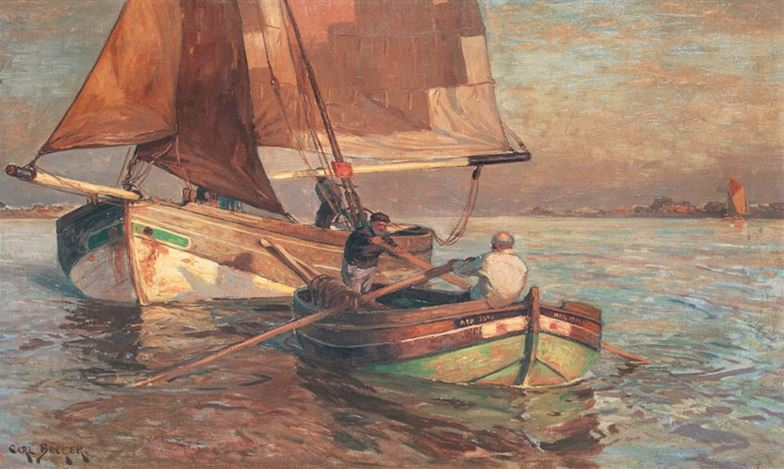
Coming Home with the Catch

Carl Emil Rudolf Ludwig Becker (31 August 1862 – 12 February 1926) was a German marine artist.

== Life and work ==
He was born in Hamelin. His father was a military doctor. In 1866, as a result of the annexation of the Kingdom of Hanover by the Kingdom of Prussia, his father was transferred to Altona (now part of Hamburg), where he grew up. He attended the realschule there, and received his first art lessons from the marine painter, Heinrich Leitner. In 1887, he enrolled at the Kunstakademie Düsseldorf. Until 1893, he was a student of the landscape painter, Eugen Dücker, He also studied engraving and etching with Carl Ernst Forberg.

He was awarded gold medals at the International Art Exhibition of 1894, in Vienna, and the Große Berliner Kunstausstellung of 1896. Three years later, he was one of the co-founders of the Düsseldorfer Künstler-Vereinigung (artists' association). After the turn of the century, marine painting was heavily promoted by Kaiser Wilhelm II, who was attempting to make Germany a major sea power. As a result, the demand for Becker's paintings increased further inland.

His studio was in a suburb of Düsseldorf, and he worked mostly by commissions. This included a major one for murals in the German shipping pavilion at the Exposition Universelle of 1900, in Paris. Shortly after, he became a member of the Altonaer Künstlerverein, and promoted their exhibitions.

He was married to Annette Otto; daughter of Nicolaus Otto, the inventor who developed one of the first internal combustion engines. Their son, Claus, was born in 1902. The following year, they returned to Hamburg. Claus displayed an early aptitude for art and also became a painter, in a wide variety of genres. He died in Hamburg in 1983.
