= Hugo Schnars-Alquist =

German art collector and painter

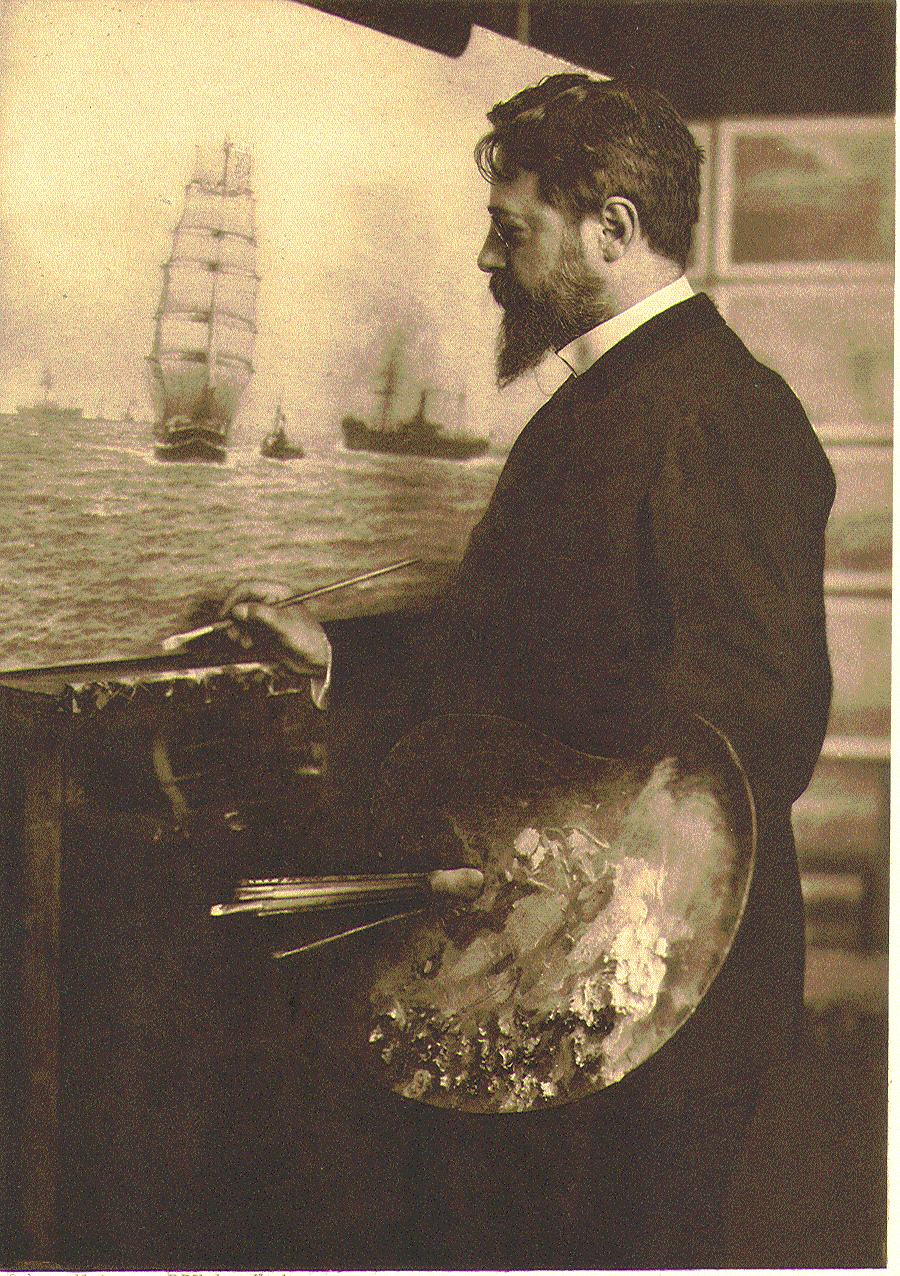
Hugo Schnars-Alquist at work in 1905.

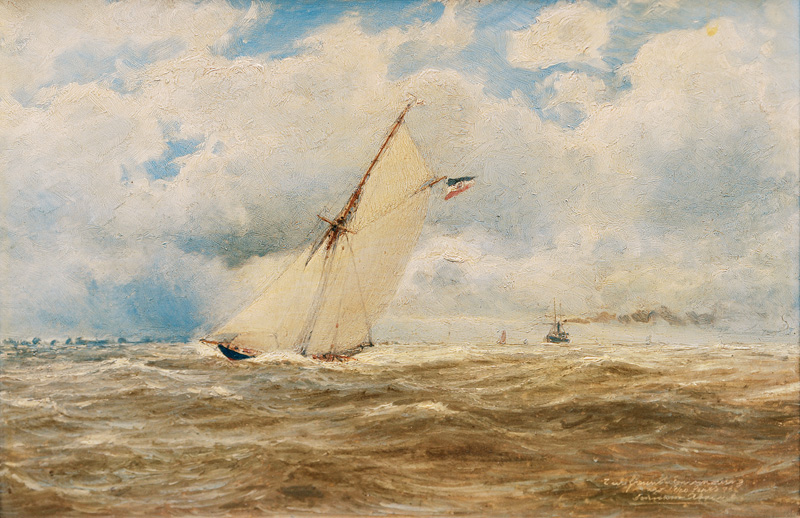
Auf der Elbe, 1898.

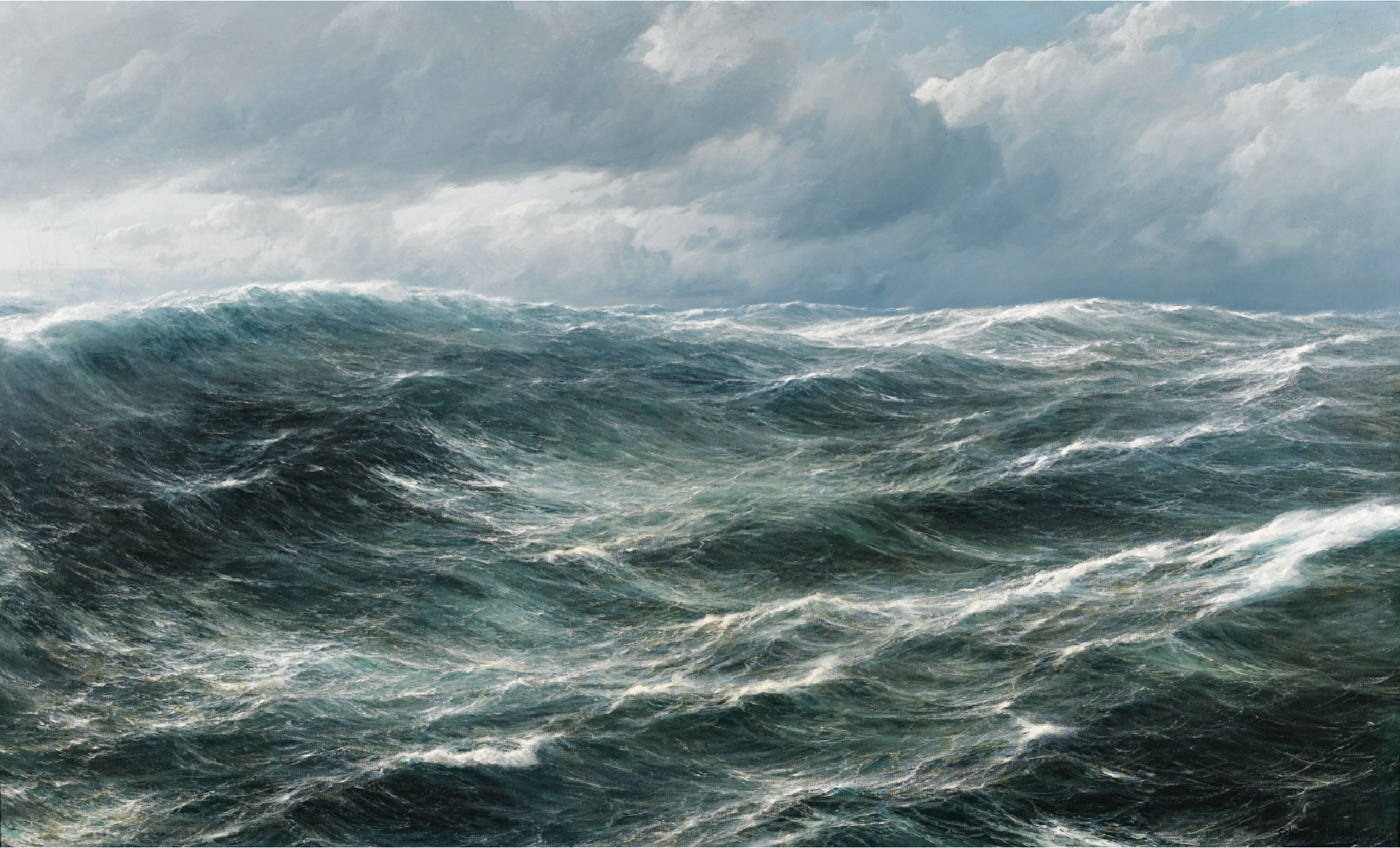
Marinestück, 1906.

Carl Wilhelm Hugo Schnars-Alquist (29 October 1855 in Hamburg – 20 August 1939 in Hamburg) was a German art collector and painter of maritime scenes.

== Early life ==
Schnars-Alquist was the son of a merchant and himself first a merchant.

== Art career ==
Schnars-Alquist formed a trade school in his native city in drawing and painting. Due to the success of different seascapes, which immediately found buyers, he became about 1884 and 1886 a student of Hans Gude at the Prussian Academy of Arts in Berlin. In 1888-89 he was a delegate of the German art association and a member of the jury at the world exhibition in Melbourne, founded in 1891 by Max Liebermann, Walter Leistikow and others the "union of the XI". In 1892-93 he was a member of the Reich Commission, a member of the Jury in Chicago, and in 1896 was appointed professor and moved back from Berlin to Hamburg. He was also a member of the Hamburg association of artists.

His numerous voyages to North, Central and South America, Australia, Tasmania, New Zealand, Ceylon, northern and southern Europe taught him to describe the sea under all latitudes, in all seasons and in all moods. His works were owned by the German Emperor Wilhelm II. (Help in sight, 1890), the Chancellor Bernhard von Bülow (Germany, 1900), the Kunsthalle Hamburg (West, 1903), the museums in Elbing, Adelaide, St. Louis and many private collections in Germany, America, Australia etc. He also painted many pictures of the steamers of the Hamburg-America Line.

In 1893, Schnars-Alquist was the German delegate for the fine arts at the World's Columbian Exposition.
