= Glen Line =

UK shipping transport company

Coordinates: 31.2428°N 121.4855°E

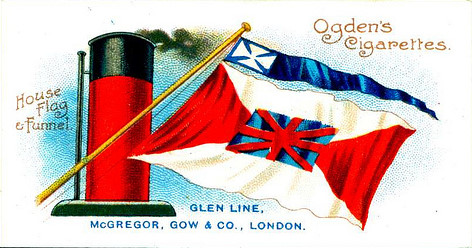
A cigarette card showing the Glen Line funnel and flag colours

House Flag and Pennant of the Glen Line

Glen Line was a UK shipping line that was founded in Glasgow in 1867. Its head office was later moved first to London and then to Liverpool.

== History ==
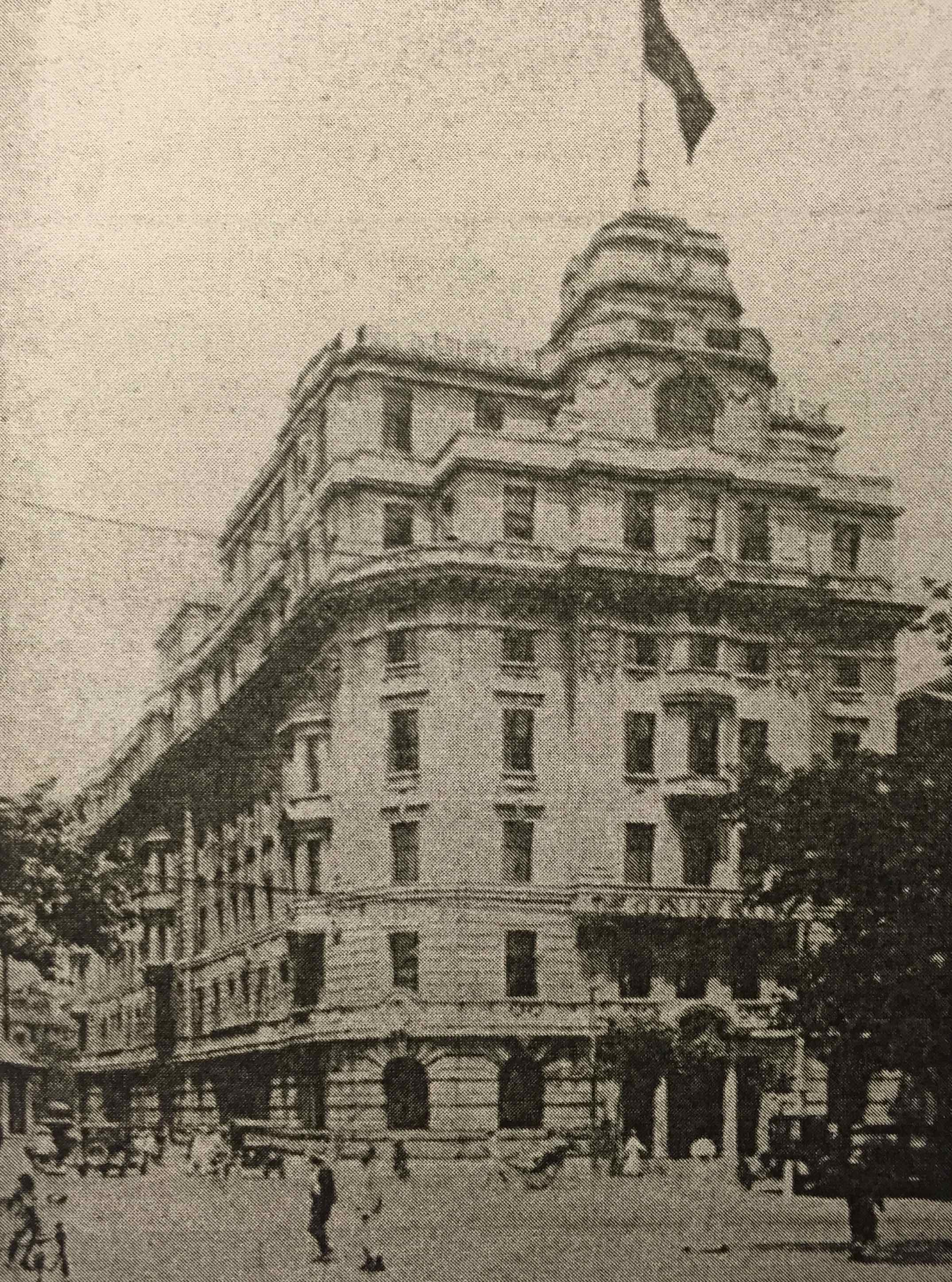
The Glen Line Building at the Corner of Peking Road and the Bund, Shanghai, 1939

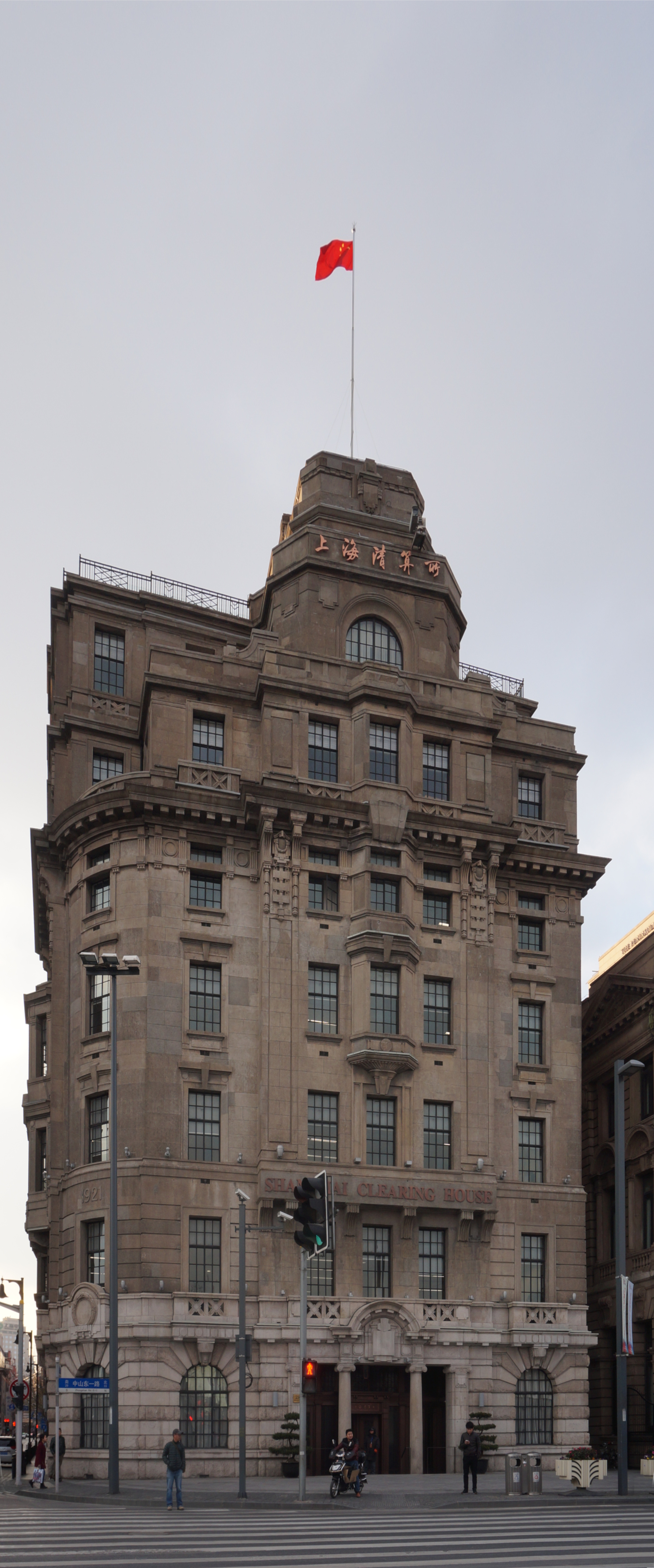
Glen Line building in Shanghai in 2014

The firm had its roots in the co-operation between the Gow and McGregor families in Glasgow in the 1850s. Alan C Gow was a voyage broker, James McGregor organised the freight to fill the ships and by 1860 they were in partnership.

In 1867 Alan Gow had the sailing ship Estrella de Chile built to ply the route between Glasgow, Liverpool, and Chile via Cape Horn. She was wrecked in 1888. In 1868 the partners bought the barque Glenavon. She was the first of their ships to have the Glen- prefix in her name. In 1881 the firm had the iron-hulled steamship Glenavon built. She was wrecked off the coast of China in 1898, killing 53 people.

In 1911, Elder Dempster and Co acquired The Glen Line. During the First World War Glen Line lost five ships to U-boat attacks, including its first motor ship, Glenartney, in 1918.

In 1922, the Glen Line opened its new building on the Bund in Shanghai. The shipping agency occupied the first floor and the upper floors were rented out.

The Glen Line was sold to Alfred Holt's Blue Funnel line in 1935. The company lost two further ships to U-boat attacks in the Second World War.

By 1978 all Glen Line ships had been sold.
