= Pavlos Samios =

Greek painter and professor (1948–2021)

- Born: Παύλος Σάμιος; October 28, 1948; Athens, Greece
- Died: February 4, 2021 (aged 72)
- Known for: Painting, Icon painting
- Website: http://www.samiospavlos.gr/

Pavlos Samios (Greek: Παύλος Σάμιος; 1948-2021) was a Greek painter and professor at the Athens School of Fine Arts.

== Biography ==
Samios was born on October 28, 1948 in Athens, Greece. His interest in art rose during his early childhood when he used to spend many hours at his father's workshop (Samios's father was a shoemaker). As a teenager he worked at Dionysios Karoussos icon-painting studio and at the same time he attended drawing lessons under Panos Sarafianos so that he could pass the exams in order to enter the School of Fine Arts where he became accepted in 1969.

He studied at the Athens School of Fine Arts under Nikos Nikolaou and Yiannis Moralis, graduating in 1972. In early 1978 Samios organised his first solo exhibition in Athens where he exhibited a total of 36 paintings inspired by Agion Oros. The same year he moved to Paris where he lived until 1992. During his stay in France he became associated with Yannis Tsarouchis, who had a major influence on Samios. Manos Hatzidakis was another person who influenced Samios.

In his paintings Samios expresses a symbolic and metaphysical vision. He used several painting techniques (fresco, tempera, etc.) which are characteristic of his various periods of work. His works are found in private collections, museums and cultural institutions worldwide (Macedonian Museum of Contemporary Art, National Gallery of Greece, Andros Museum of Contemporary Art etc.).

Since 2000 he was a professor at the Athens School of Fine Arts.

== Exhibitions (selected) ==
=== Individual exhibitions ===
- Zoumboulakis Gallery, Athens (1978, 1987)
- Galerie Samy Kinge, Paris (1982, 1986, 1989, 1990, 1992, 1995, 2005)
- FIAC, Paris (1986)
- Zeta Mi Gallery, Thessaloniki (1988)
- Les Ateliers de Montmartre, Espace de Vente, Paris (1989)
- Gallery K, London (1997)
- Municipal Art Gallery of Mykonos (1997)
- Yiorki Residence, Nicosia (1997)
- Gallery 4, Chalkis (1998)
- Galerie Epreuve d’Artiste, Beirut (1999)
- Helexpo, Maroussi (2000)
- City of Athens Cultural Centre (2002)
- Greek Cultural Center, New York City (2002)
- The Maliotis Cultural Center, Boston (2002)
- Benaki Museum, Athens (2007, 2014 – 2015)
- Centre Culturel Français de Hanoi, Hanoi (2009)
- Municipal Art Gallery of Chania (2016)

=== Group exhibitions ===
- Exhibition on a house's garage, Pangrati (1972)
- FIAC, Grand Palais, Paris (1982, 1983, 1996)
- MSI, Chicago (1985)
- Russell Senate Office Building, Washington, D.C. (1986)
- Seibu Yarakucho, Tokyo (1989)
- Municipal Art Gallery of Larissa (1992)
- Averoff Gallery, Metsovo (1993, 1996)
- Nicosia International Conference Center (1994)
- Galerie Yahia, Tunis (1995)
- Macedonian Museum of Contemporary Art, Thessaloniki (1997)
- Municipal Art Gallery, Thessaloniki (1997)
- Gallery K, London (1998)
- Hotel Athens Plaza (1999)
- Museum of Contemporary Art, Basil & Elise Goulandris Foundation Andros (2001)
- Benaki Museum (2004)
- St Mark's Basilica, Heraklion (2004)
- The National Arts Club, New York (2006, 2007, 2008, 2011)
- Sotheby's, London (2009)
- Athens School of Fine Arts (2009)
- Skoufa Gallery, Athens (2013)
- Alma Contemporary Art Gallery, Trikala (2015)
