= Markos Zavitsianos =

Markos Zavitisianos
- Μάρκος Ζαβιτσίανος
- Born: 1884; Istanbul, Turkey
- Died: 1923 (aged 38–39); Geneva, Switzerland
- Known for: Printmaking, painting, and Socialism

Markos Zavitsianos or Zavitzianos (Greek:Μάρκος Ζαβιτσιάνος ή Ζαβιτζιάνος; 1884, Istanbul — 1923, Geneva) was a Greek printmaker, painter, and early socialist.

== Biography ==
He was born in Istanbul to a Greek family from Corfu. His father was a doctor and his mother, of French origin, was an amateur artist. He studied at the Phanar Greek Orthodox College but, in 1902, his family returned to Corfu.

In 1903, he went to Munich, where he studied from 1906 at the Academy of Fine Arts under painter Gabriel von Hackl. He also took lessons in engraving. During his stay there, he became close friends with the writer Konstantinos Theotokis, one of the first Greek socialists, and was strongly influenced by his ideas. At the age of only twenty-three, he became deeply involved in the controversy surrounding the Marxist inspired book, Our Common Goal (Το Κοινωνικόν μας Ζήτημα), by Georgios Skliros; writing several pieces for the literary magazine, Ο Νουμάς.

Zavitsianos returned to Corfu in 1911, where he collaborated with Konstantinos Theotokis in creating the "Socialist Club of Corfu". The following year, he exhibited his works at the Zappeion, and began participating in an artists' society known as the "Fellowship of the Nine". For the remainder of his life, he was a prolific exhibitor; throughout Greece as well as in Paris and Berlin.

In 1912, he provided illustrations for Η τιμή και το χρήμα (Price and Money), a novel by Theotokis that the Socialist Club had published. In 1915, he was one of the founders of the literary journal, Ανθολογία Κέρκυρας (Corfu Anthology), which served as a venue for his engravings. In 1917, he was one of the founding members of the group "Ομάδα Τέχνη" (The Art Group). Other prominent painters of the group were Nikolaos Lytras, Konstantinos Parthenis, Konstantinos Maleas and others.

From 1919 to 1922, Zavitsianos worked on a series of illustrations for a new edition of Στον ήσκιο της συκιάς (In the Shade of the Fig Tree), a collection of short stories by the Demoticist writer, Petros Vlastos that was never published. While visiting Geneva in 1923, he contracted a case of pneumonia and died, at the age of thirty-nine. Since his death there have been repeated retrospectives of his work. Some of his engravings were posthumously exhibited at the 20th Venice Biennale in 1936.

Zavitsianos paintings can be found at the National Gallery of Greece, the Municipal Gallery of Corfu, the Municipal Art Gallery of Chania etc.

== Gallery ==
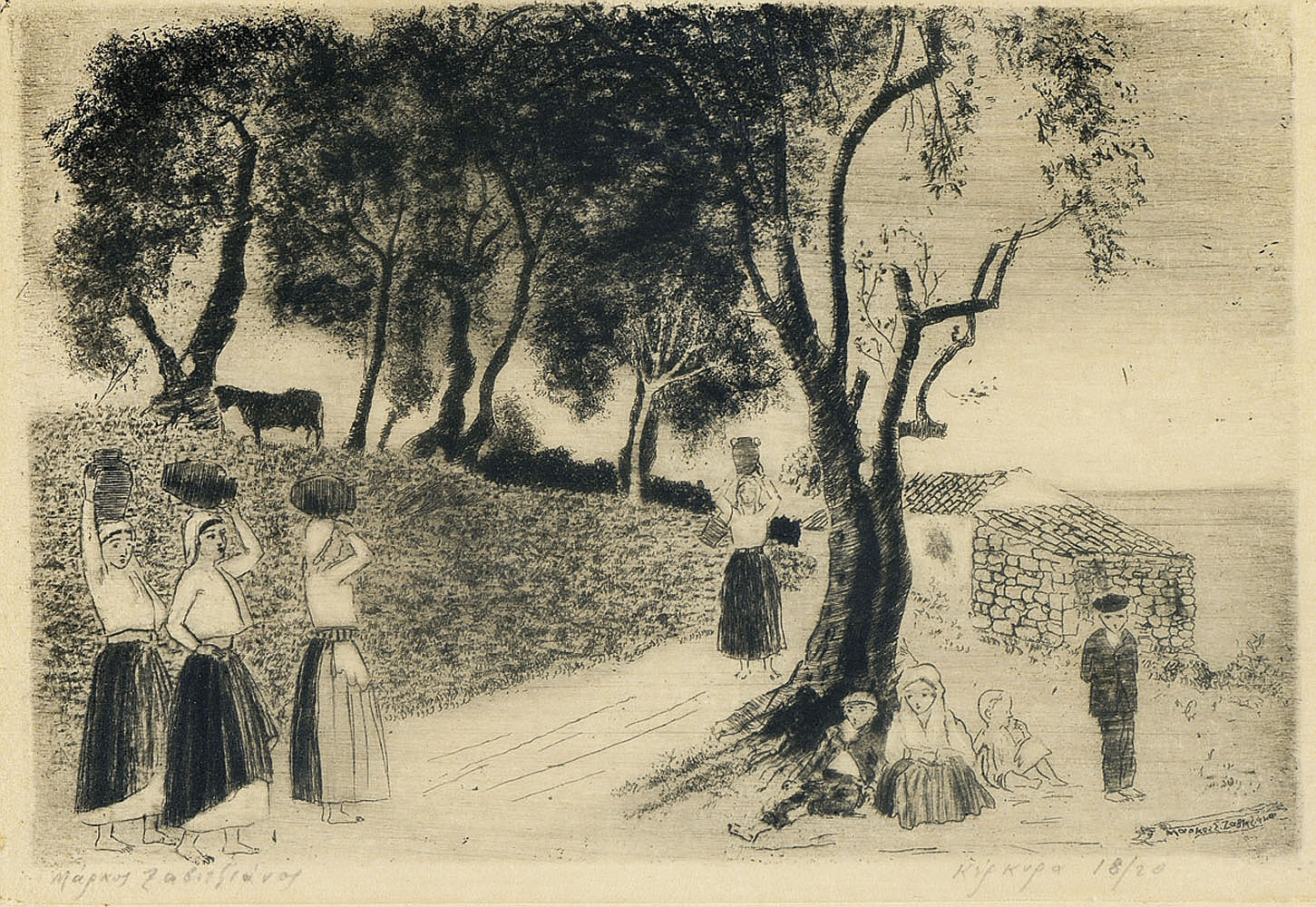
Scene from Corfu

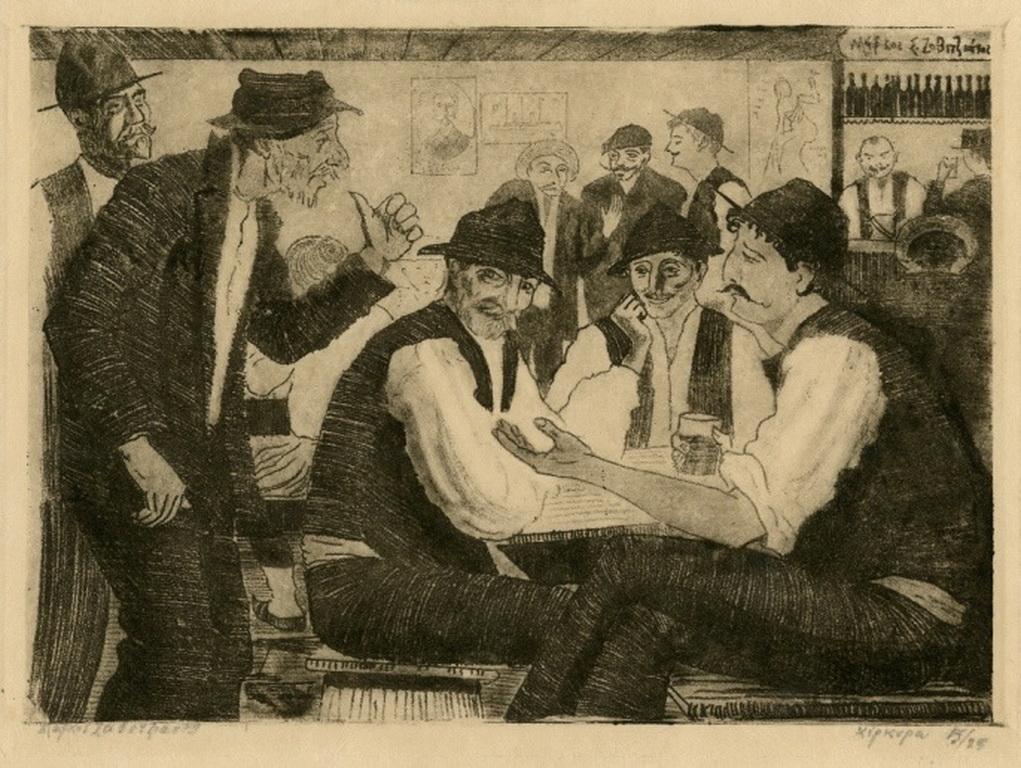
In the Tavern (The Quarrel)

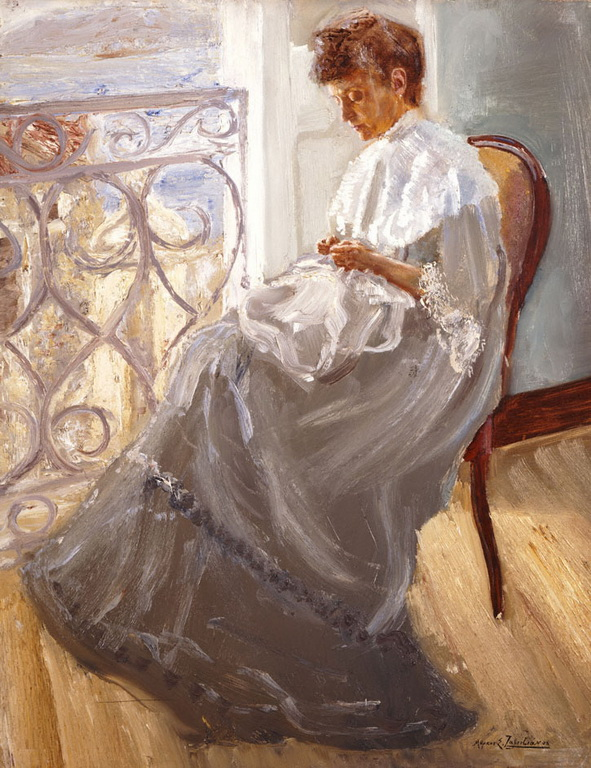
On the Balcony

== Bibliography ==
- Lampraki-Plaka, Marina· Karakourti-Orfanopoulou, Lamprini, ed. (2020). Η ανθρώπινη μορφή στην ελληνική ζωγραφική, 20ός αιώνας. Athens: Ίδρυμα Βασίλη και Μαρίνας Θεοχαράκη. p. 21. ISBN 978-618-5201-10-4
