= Funeral Composition =

1958 painting by Yiannis Moralis

- Επιτύμβιο (Greek)
- Artist: Yiannis Moralis
- Year: 1958
- Medium: Oil on canvas
- Dimensions: 204 cm × 223 cm (80 in × 88 in)
- Location: National Gallery; Athens

Funeral Composition is painting by Yiannis Moralis from 1958.

== Description ==
The painting has dimensions of 204 x 224 centimeters. It is in the collection of the National Gallery-Museum Alexandros Soutzos (Ex. 2432).

== Analysis ==
This work of Yannis Moralis brings together a number of key features that seem of interest and concern to the artist since the early 1950s. It manifests the experimentation taking place in the broader displacement of Greek painting in the 1950s and 1960 to formalities.

The subject of the composition is a farewell scene with clear references to thematic and component level to the ancient columns as he acknowledges: "The first to have correlated these works with ancient monuments and the tombstone was Manolis Hatzidakis, Angelos Prokopios, Elias Petropoulos, George Savvides. They followed other analyses, more scientific. Seferis says, [...] the interpretation of each project is the interpretation of ourselves. But, it is true that there is in these works a sense of death that was taught by ancient monuments." The same had decisively affect the Pompeian painting ..

Even Xenagontas' students of the Athens School of Fine Arts, in the course of their visit to the National Gallery rooms in 1988, will stop in front of the particular project and referring to it will say: "Here the common denominator is the background color, preparation (ocher, black). the use as color, like a shadow, like the Byzantine and post the protroplasm. We work piecemeal, but must not lose the image of the whole. and do not hesitate to sacrifice. You start to paint when you start sacrifice, as he and Delacroix. Emotionally you can start from a detail. but another motivation and another how will the symbol. The painting is a language finite, like all languages. There can be everything we want to say. When you accept this the contract in a strange way, liberate. And you learn to read your works, after making them. This will help you a lot."

== The Venice Biennale (1958) and the first solo exhibition in Athens (1959) ==
The painting composition Funeral Composition is also of interest in connection with the participation of the artist in two reports important for his resume: his participation, along with Yannis Tsarouhis and Anthony Soho in 1958 at the Venice Biennale, where of course, Commissioner of Tonis Spiteris, representing Greece, and organize the first solo exhibition the artist held in Athens, showroom Armos particular, the next years. The painting was between projects Moralis presented in both cases.

In an international environment, the anthropocentric painting of Moralis and Tsarouhis initiated the interest of Gio Ponti. Ponti would devote "three pages, with plenty of pictures and text very laudatory" of his magazine Domus to the work in a unique instance of a Greek painter gaining attention abroad.

Giò Ponti:

There is a secret sect, the sect of those who know how to depict the human form. [...] And feel passionate bliss to enjoy with animal joy the opportunity to represent this form in all activities and on the physiognomy display fleeting expressions and to distinguish the characteristics of a precise contours [...] to depict seeing in this image, in this profile an extreme limit of humanity expression, human history but also the history of our time described simultaneously. The two Greek painters Yannis Moralis and John Tsarouhis belong to this "mystical company." because as I saw in Venice their projects, and was glad, because to the same sect, I belonged too.

== Bibliography ==
- Καψάλης, Δ. (επιμ.), Γιάννης Μόραλης. Σχέδια 1934-1994, Αθήνα, ΜΙΕΤ, 2008
- Κουτσομάλλης, Κ. (επιμ.), Παϊσιος, Ν. (τεκμηρίωση), Ι. Μόραλης. Μια ανίχνευση, Μουσείο Σύγχρονης Τέχνης, Άνδρος, 2008
- Μάλαμα, Ά. (επιμ.), Τιμή στον Γιάννη Μόραλη, Αθήνα, ΕΠΜΑΣ, 2011
- Μεντζαφού, Ό., «Γιάννης Μόραλης», Λεξικό Ελλήνων Καλλιτεχνών. Ζωγράφοι – Γλύπτες – Χαράκτες, 16^{ος}-20^{ος} αιώνας, Ε.Δ. Ματθιόπουλος (επιμ.), Αθήνα, Μέλισσα, 1999, σ. 146–152
- Μπόλης, Γ., Γιάννης Μόραλης, Αθήνα, Κ. Αδάμ Εκδοτική, 2005
- Οράτη, Ειρ. (εισαγωγή), Γιάννης Μόραλης. Χαρακτικά, Αθήνα, εκδόσεις Βέργος, 1993
- Τσιγκάκου, Φ.-Μ. (σύνταξη-επιμ.), Ι. Μόραλης. Άγγελοι, μουσική, ποίηση, Μουσείο Μπενάκη, Αθήνα, 2001
- Φωτόπουλος, Β. (επιμ.), Γιάννης Μόραλης, εισαγωγή: Παπαστάμος, Δ., Αθήνα, Όμιλος Εταιριών Εμπορικής Τράπεζας, 1988
- Χρήστου, Χρ, Μόραλης, καλλιτεχνική επιμ. έκδοσης: Β. Φωτόπουλος, Αθήνα, εκδόσεις Αδάμ, 1993
