= Cafe Neon (Night) =

Painting by Yannis Tsarouchis

- Καφενείον το Νέον (Νύχτα) (Greek)
- Artist: Yannis Tsarouchis
- Year: 1965
- Medium: oil on canvas
- Dimensions: 127 cm × 180 cm (50 in × 71 in)
- Location: National Gallery of Greece; Athens

Cafe Neon (Night) (Greek: Καφενείον το Νέον (Νύχτα)) is an oil painting by Yannis Tsarouchis created between 1965 and 1966.

== Description ==
The painting's dimensions are 127 x 180 centimeters. It is in the collection of the National Gallery in Athens.

== Analysis ==
It depicts the facade of the eponymous cafe, which exists today in Omonia Square in Athens. In this series, it is preceded by Cafe Neon (Day).

The theme of "coffee shops" has occupied Tsarouhis repeatedly within the overall interest to study the contemporary urban landscape, not only in space but also as a social context and version of an overall lifestyle. The "Cafes" as compositions thus work for the artist as a kind of privileged case study to give the opportunity to experiment around a number of issues, which concern the painting steadily: his interest in the study of the history of art; case reports in the facades as a scenographic role during the baroque period; or the timelessness and rhythmic repetitions that can be associated with his interest in Byzantine art; the meeting of set design and direction by painting, printing of architectural elements, their geometry, and their organization in axes allow the artist to experiment with synthetic values of removal.

As indicated in the literature, the joint project approach of cafe Neon (Night) with the version, also situated at the National Gallery, with the composition cafe Neon (Day) [II. 3497]: "The two cafes function as a diptych, because together the two, give the full picture of the Greek cafe, as mythological, emotional and social space, in two different times of the day. The visual stimulus of these two images is, respectively, sunlight and the artificial light of night, creating the building during different visual episodes.

Tsarouhis lists Cafe Neon among his best works. The debate on this project is very interesting and the following point of view: while the cafe Neon is a clearly document work is one of the essential formalities abstract Greek art in painting, in terms of direct or indirect references incorporating the artistic values and deeper metaphysical artists such as Piet Mondrian. That Tsarouhis never abandon figuration, but really understood in depth the meaning and functions of abstract art. Once the dominance of abstract art is absolute, he chooses to study in depth the figurative painting of America. The café atmosphere reminiscent of similar scenes of Edward Hopper, targeting and achieving just the visual transcription of the experience. He wrote:

The perfect world of abstract painting hurry from a passion that leads to imitation. Thus, after passion imitation of nature only pleasing those who do not find anything else to do. It is said that anyone is allowed to paint only abstract when he knows how to imitate true nature. I would say the opposite, that, namely, one who knows that painting is harmony has the right to paint nature, because he has great passion.
