= Nikos Hadjikyriakos-Ghikas =

Greek artist, writer and academic (1906–1994)

Nikos Hadjikyriakos-Ghikas (Greek: Νίκος Χατζηκυριάκος-Γκίκας; February 26, 1906 – September 3, 1994), also known as Nikos Ghika, was a leading Greek painter, sculptor, engraver, writer and academic. He was a founding member of the Association of Greek Art Critics, AICA-Hellas, International Association of Art Critics.

He studied ancient and Byzantine art as well as folk art due to his adoration for the Greek landscape. During his youth he was exposed in Paris to the avant-garde European artistic trends and he gained recognition as the leading Greek cubist artist.

His aim was to focus on the harmony and purity of Greek art and to deconstruct the Greek landscape and intense natural light into simple geometric shapes and interlocking planes.

His works are featured in the National Gallery (Athens), the Musée d'Art Moderne de la Ville de Paris, the Tate Gallery in London, the Metropolitan Museum of New York and in private collections worldwide.

== Biography ==
Hadjikyriakos-Ghikas was born in Athens on 26 February 1906. His father, the admiral Alexandros Hadjikyriakos, and his mother Princess Eleni Ghika both played an important role in the Greek War of Independence of 1821. In his teens (1918–1922) his family recognised the potential of his talent and arranged for him to study painting with the artist Parthenis. He additionally would spend his summers in his house in Hydra (island), where, between the years of 1935-1940 and 1945-1961 he would create some of his most important and critically acclaimed works. In 1922 he enrolled in a Sorbonne University course for French literature and aesthetics, where he simultaneously attended more and more the Académie Ranson, studying painting and engraving. He first exhibited his artwork when he was 17 in 1923 at the Société des Artistes Indépendants (Salon des Indépendants) and not long afterwards took part in several group exhibits at the Salon des Tuileries and the Salon des surindépendants. What's more, the french press and french magazines often wrote about his work. In 1927 he had his first one-man show at Gallerie Percier. Picasso himself noticed and commented on the works of the young Greek artist. The following year in 1928 he held his first exhibition in Athens alongside sculptor Michael Tombros.

In 1933 he organised in Athens the 4th International Architectural Symposium and presented in Paris at the Galeria Vavin-Raspail. In 1934 he arranged another exhibition of his sculptures in the Gallerie des Cahiers d' Art together with works from artists such as Sophie Taeuber-Arp and in the international exhibitions of Paris and Venice. A year later in 1935 he shared an exhibition again with Michael Tombros along with painter Gounaro, an event which, just like his previous shared exhibit in 1928 considerably stirred the athenian art world. Following this retrospective, between the years of 1936-1937 he collaborated with poet Papatzonis, architect Dimitris Pikionis and theatrical director Sokratis Karantinos for the release of Trito Mati (The Third Eye). A periodical in which Avant-Garde sculptors, authors and painters whose work was not originally translated in Greek such as Wassily Kandinsky, Paul Klee was included. In 1941 he was elected Professor of Drawing in the Architectural School of the National Technical University of Athens where he taught up until 1958. Five years after the commence of his career as a professor in 1946 he participated in an exhibition in London England of Greek Art at the Royal Academy where the same year the British Council in Athens arranged his first retrospective exhibition which contained 42 of his paintings. In 1949 he formed, with other artists including Yiannis Moralis, Yannis Tsarouchis, Nikos Nikolaou, Nikos Engonopoulos and Panayiotis Tetsis, the "Armos" art group. In 1950 he represented Greece at the 25th Venice Biennale, where he exhibited 17 of his canvasses.

Following that, he married Barbara Hutchinson, who had previously been married to Victor Rothschild, 3rd Baron Rothschild and to classicist Rex Warner in 1961 and in the years between 1950-1965 he help 12 one man exhibitions in cities and regions such as Geneva, London, Berlin, Paris, Athens and New York City where his work was displayed and presented by René Char. Moreover, he arranged a further retrospective, this time containing a hundred of his paintings, at the Whitechapel Gallery in London, in 1968 and in 1970 he was awarded The First Prize in Fine Arts by the Academy of Athens (modern) which in 1973 nominated him to a full membership. He held one man shows on five occasions in 1972 and 1973, once in Milan, once in Paris, once in London and twice in Athens, where again, in 1973 the National Gallery of Athens initiated a series of exhibitions contains works from some of the largest Greek painters, with a large exhibition consisting of 164 works from Ghika.

In 1986 he became a member of the Royal Academy in London. He was also a member of the Tiberiana Academy in Rome and was granted the title of Officier des Arts et des Lettres from the French government. Lastly, in 1988 he had his last exhibition at the Royal Academy of London, his wife, Barbara, died in 1989.

He died on September 3, 1994, in Athens.

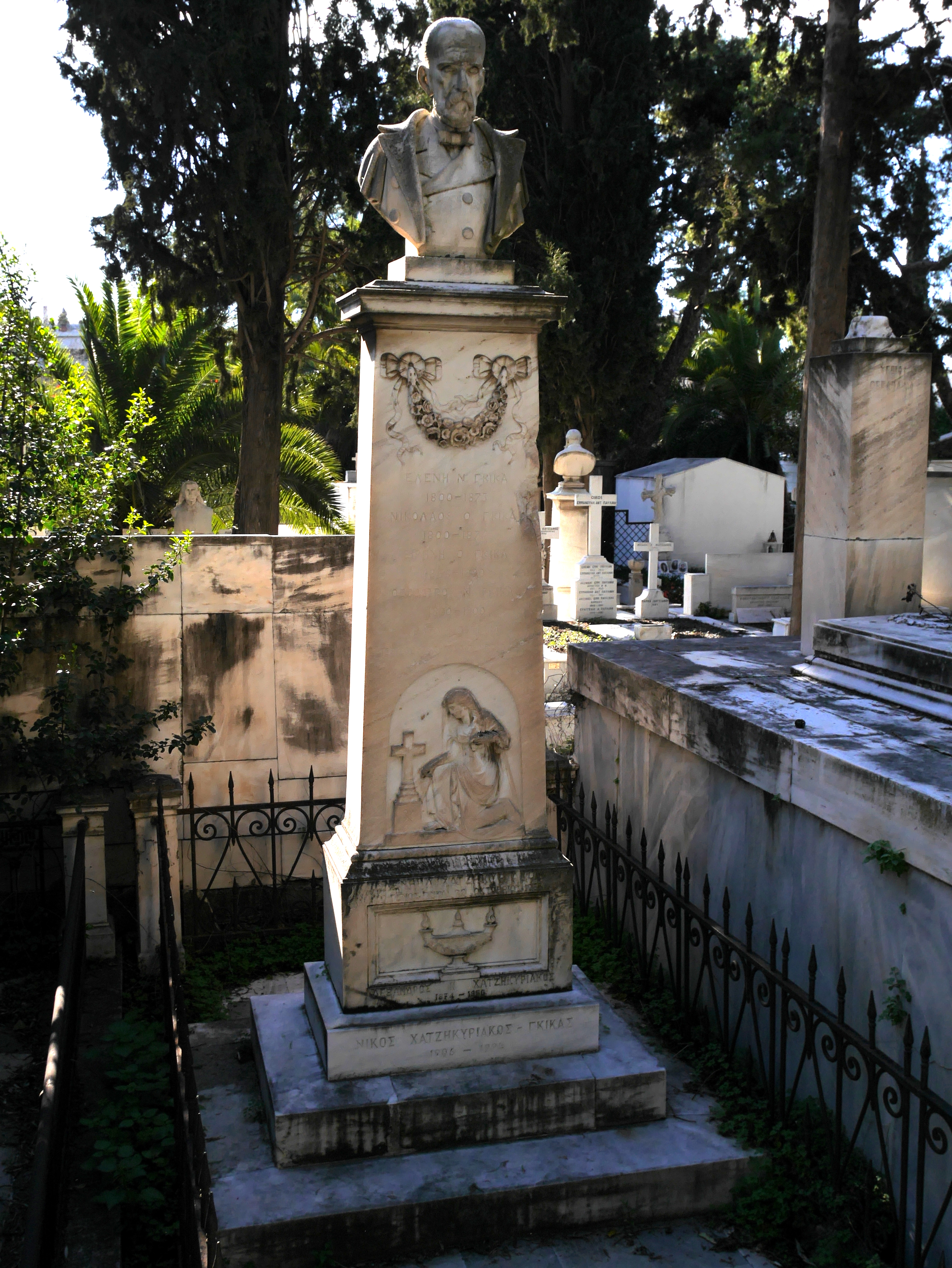
The tomb of the Ghikas family

Today in Greece he is celebrated as one of the most important modern Greek painters. His house has been converted to a museum and is being run by the Benaki Museum. In 2018, the British Museum hosted an exhibition which focuses on the friendship of Ghika, the artist John Craxton, and the writer Patrick Leigh Fermor; their shared love of Greece was fundamental to their work.

== Aspirations ==
when he was younger, he dipped his toes at something approaching abstract art, after which he progressively abandoned his inclination to splinter his subject into separate components and reconstruct it based on his concept of plasticity. Because of this he begins to slowly come to terms with all that is really around him. This transformation of his art came about from more profound and deeply philosophical causes. His latest experience in plasticity and transgression with the rules of non-figurative painting are his way of responding to the need of reconstructing his work entirely and reassessing his own attitudes and values.

A question that concerns us heavily today, which argues whether or not we can transform art into a game, a pastime, or is this amplification of the form and mass of objects, this elaborate and prestigious abstraction of their innermost being not merely a child's game, is what he often seemed to ask to himself in attempting to resolve the creative indefiniteness of art.
