= National Gallery (Athens) =

- Εθνική Πινακοθήκη

- Established: 1878
- Location: Pangrati, Athens, Greece
- Coordinates: 37°58′32″N 23°44′57″E
- Type: art museum
- Director: Syrago Tsiara
- Website: www.nationalgallery.gr/en/

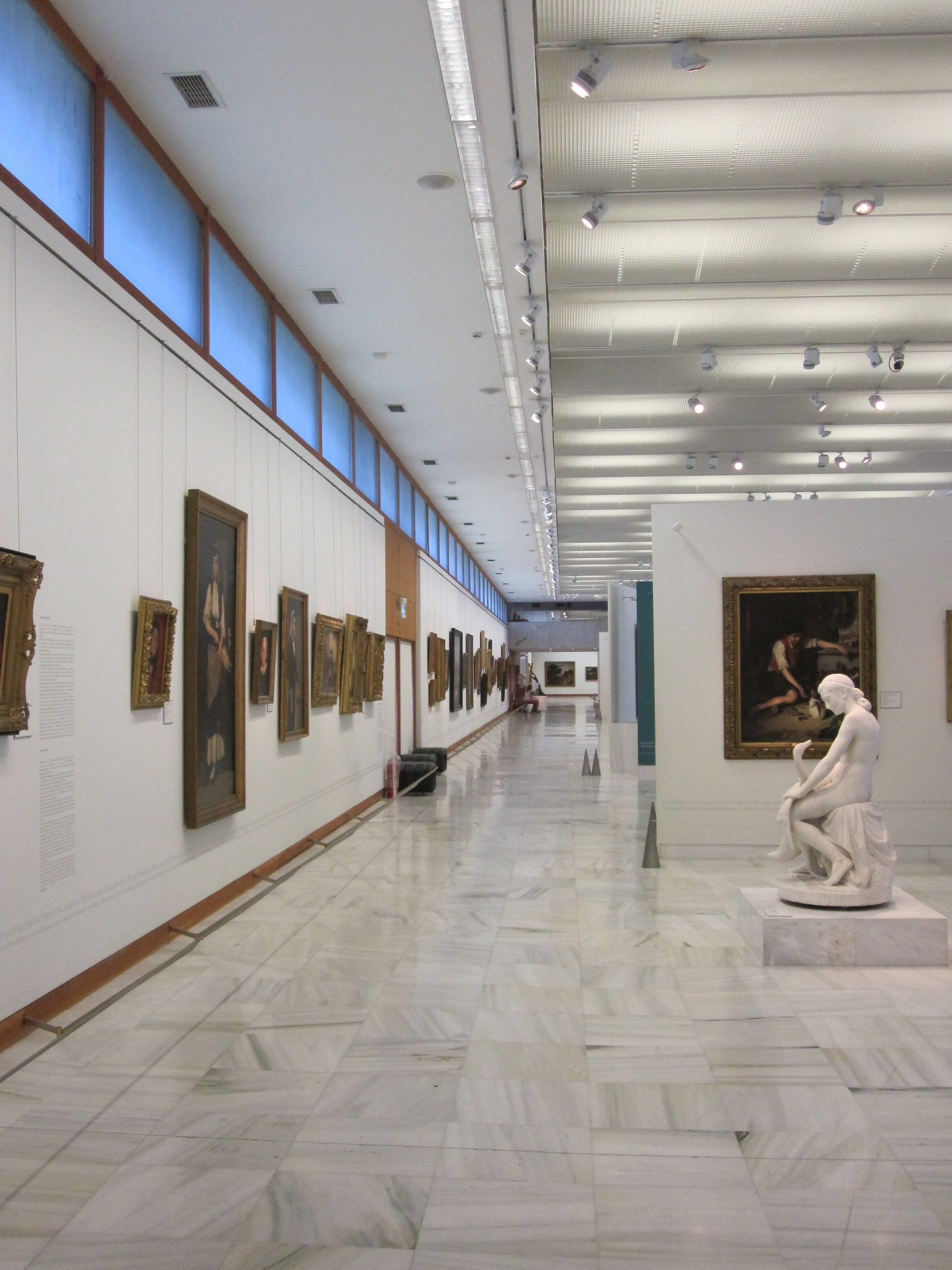
One of the Gallery's collections

The National Gallery (Greek: Εθνική Πινακοθήκη, Ethniki Pinakothiki) is an art museum located on Vasilissis Sofias avenue in the Pangrati district, Athens, Greece. It is devoted to Greek and European art from the 14th century to the 20th century.

The newly renovated building reopened after an 8 year refurbishment, on 24 March 2021, a day before the 200th anniversary of the Greek War of Independence.

== History ==
It was established in 1878 as a small collection of 117 works exhibited at the Athens University. In 1896, Alexandros Soutzos, a jurist and art lover, bequeathed his collection and estate to the Greek Government aspiring to the creation of an art museum. The museum opened in 1900 and the first curator was Georgios Jakobides, a famous Greek painter who was a member of the Munich School artistic movement. After World War II the works began for a new building. After relocating the sculptures in the new National Glyptotheque, there was a discussion to renovate the main building and to build a new wing, which was completed in 2021.

In 2025, an exhibition at the gallery titled "The Allure of the Bizarre" was attacked by Niki MP Nikolaos Papadopoulos and a companion who threw four paintings to the floor and broke their glass frames, saying that the paintings were offensive to Orthodox Christianity. The two were briefly detained.

=== Directors ===
- Georgios Iakovidis (1900-1918)
- Zacharias Papantoniou (1918-1940)
- Georgios Stratigos (1940-1944)
- Dimitrios Evangelidis (1945-1947)
- Nikolaos Bertos (1947-1949)
- Marinos Kalligas (1949-1971)
- Andreas Ioannou (1971-1972)
- Dimitris Papastamos (1972-1989)
- Maria Michaelidou (1990-1991)
- Marina Lampraki-Plaka (1992-2022)
- Syrago Tsiara (2022- present)

== Collections ==
The gallery exhibitions are mainly focused on post-Byzantine Greek Art. The gallery owns and exhibits also an extensive collection of European artists. Particularly valuable is the collection of paintings from the Renaissance.

=== Renaissance ===
- Joachim Beuckelaer Market Scene
- Jan Brueghel the Younger The Virgin in Paradise
- Jan Brueghel the Elder
- Dürer
- El Greco The Concert of the Angels, Christ on the Cross with the Two Maries and St John, Saint Peter
- Luca Giordano Esther and Ahasuerus
- Jacob Jordaens The Adoration of the Shepherds
- Zanino di Pietro Virgin with Child and Angels
- Jacopo del Sellaio Saint Jerome in the desert
- Giovanni Battista Tiepolo Eliezer and Rebecca, The Agony in the Garden
- Lorenzo Veneziano Crucifixion
- David Vinckeboons Wine Harvest

=== 17th-20th century ===
- Ivan Aivazovsky Burning of the Turkish flagship
- Pieter Aertsen
- Jacob Beschey Moses Drawing Water from the Rock
- Braque
- Antoine Bourdelle
- Canaletto
- Raffaello Ceccoli
- Cecco del Caravaggio Youth with musical instruments
- Eugène Delacroix Mounted Greek Warrior
- Henri Fantin-Latour Still Life
- Jacques Linard Still Life
- Claude Lorrain
- René Magritte The Healer (Le thérapeute), bronze sculpture, gift from Alexander Iolas
- Albert Marquet
- Henri Matisse
- Willem van Mieris Lady with the Parrot
- Piet Mondrian Landscape with a mill
- Antony Francis van der Meulen
- Francesco Pize
- Pablo Picasso Composition
- Piranesi
- Francis Picabia
- Rembrandt
- Auguste Rodin
- Peter Paul Rubens The Feast of the Epiphany, Adoration of the Shepherds
- Maurice Utrillo

=== Greek artists ===
- Ioannis Altamouras
- Joannis Avramidis
- George Bouzianis
- Leonidas Drosis
- Nikos Engonopoulos
- Demetrios Farmakopoulos
- Alekos Fassianos
- Lazaros Fytalis
- Nikolaus Gysis
- Demetrios Galanis
- Theophilos Hatzimihail
- Nikos Hadjikyriakos-Ghikas
- Georgios Jakobides
- Nikos Kessanlis
- Ioannis Kossos
- Nikiforos Lytras
- Polychronis Lempesis
- Konstantinos Maleas
- Yannis Moralis
- Dimitris Mytaras
- Theocharis Mores
- Nikos Nikolaou
- Pericles Pantazis
- Andreas Pavias
- Konstantinos Parthenis
- Yiannis Psychopedis
- Georgios Roilos
- Lucas Samaras
- Theodoros Stamos
- Panayiotis Tetsis
- Epameinondas Thomopoulos
- Yannis Tsarouchis
- Kostas Tsoklis
- Stephanos Tzangarolas
- Theodoros Vryzakis
- Spyros Vassiliou
- Konstantinos Volanakis
- Odysseas Phokas

== Facts ==
Approximately four million people have visited the National Gallery in the last 14 years. Its exhibition activity is mainly supported by sponsorships that cover up to half of its budget. The National Gallery has opened branches in Nafplion, Sparta and Corfu.

== Visitor information ==
The gallery is situated on Vassilissis Sofias Avenue, opposite the Hilton Athens in Pangrati district. It can be reached with the Athens Metro at the Evangelismos station. It had been closed since March 2013 due to expansion works and reopened in March 2021. The National Glyptotheque is situated at the "Alsos Stratou" (Military Park) in Goudi, near Kanellopoulou Avenue and can be reached with the Athens Metro at the Katehaki station.

== Gallery ==
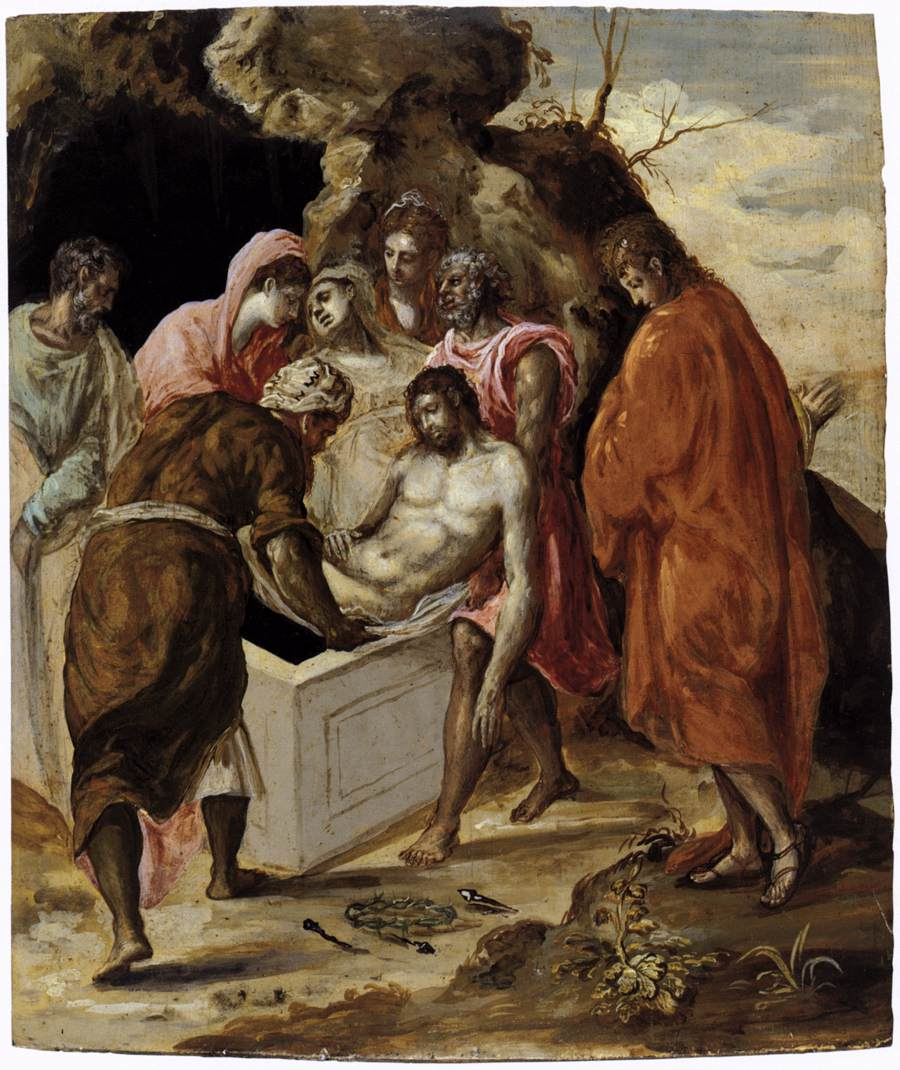
The Entombment of Christ by El Greco

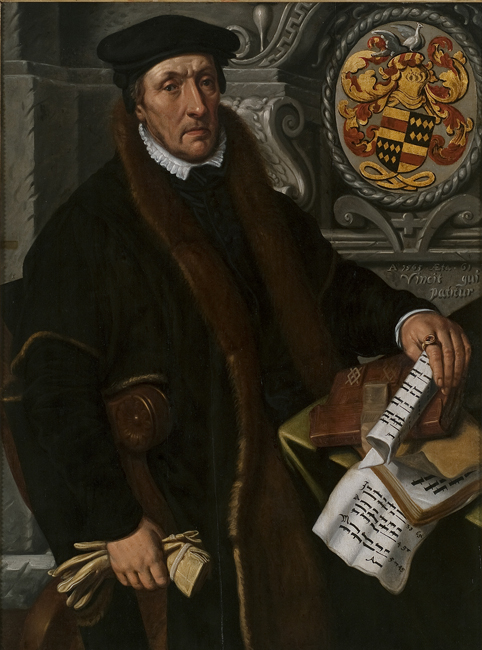
Portrait of Simon Marten Dircsz by Pieter Aertsen

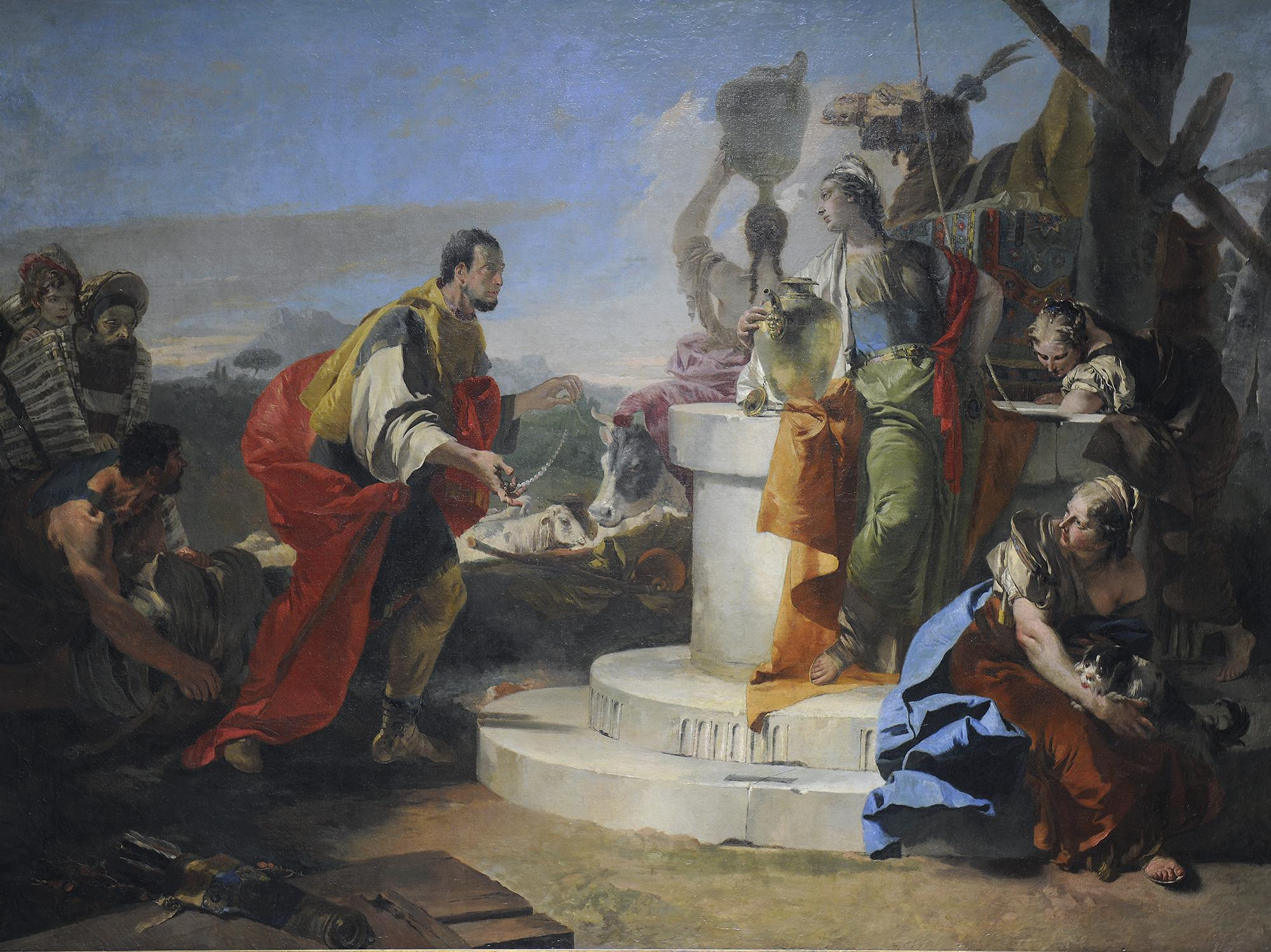
Eliezer and Rebecca by Tiepolo

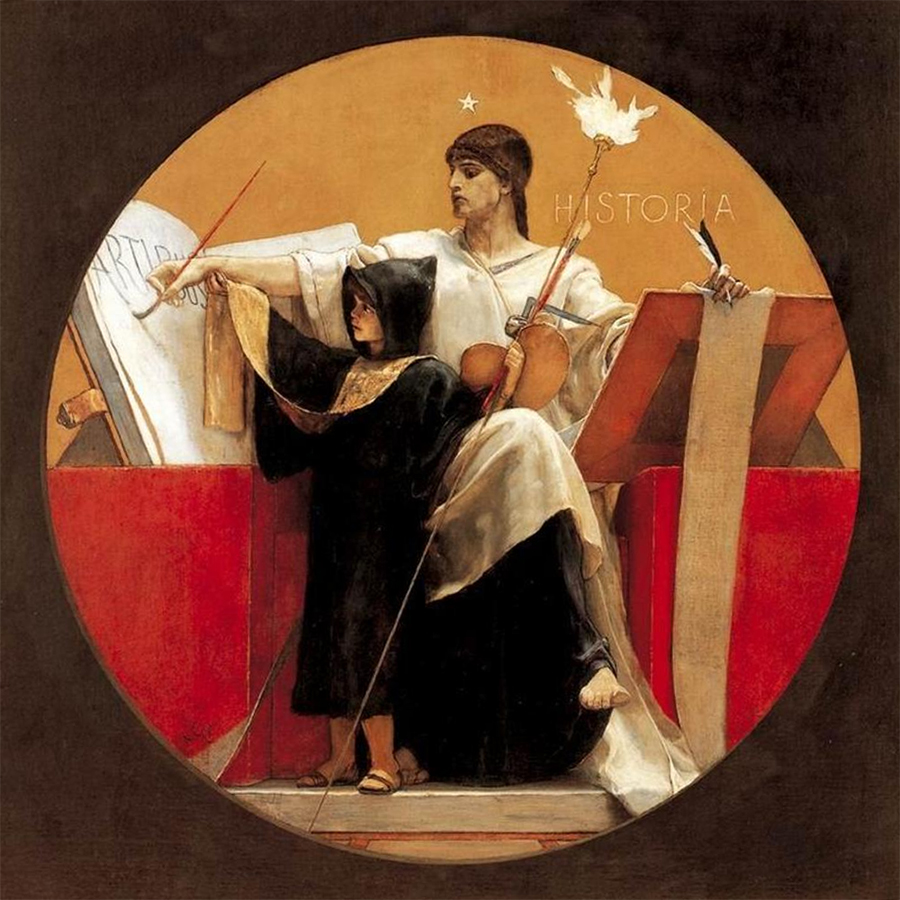
Ηistoria (Allegory of History) by Nikolaos Gyzis (1892)

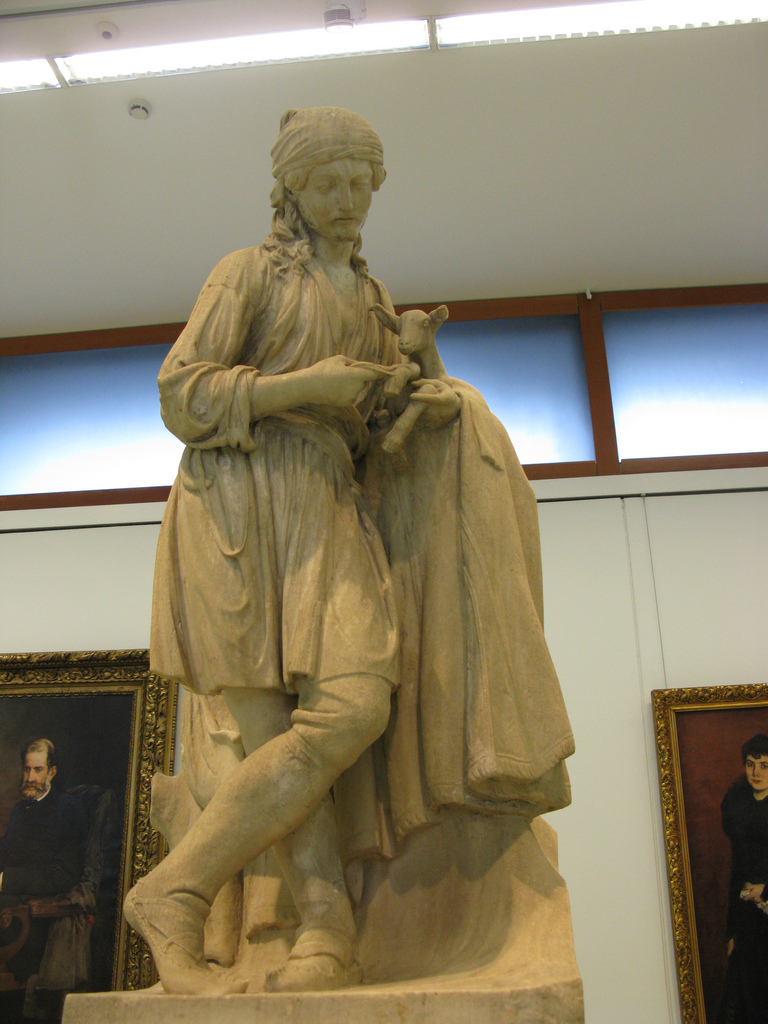
Sepherd with baby goat by Lazaros Fytalis

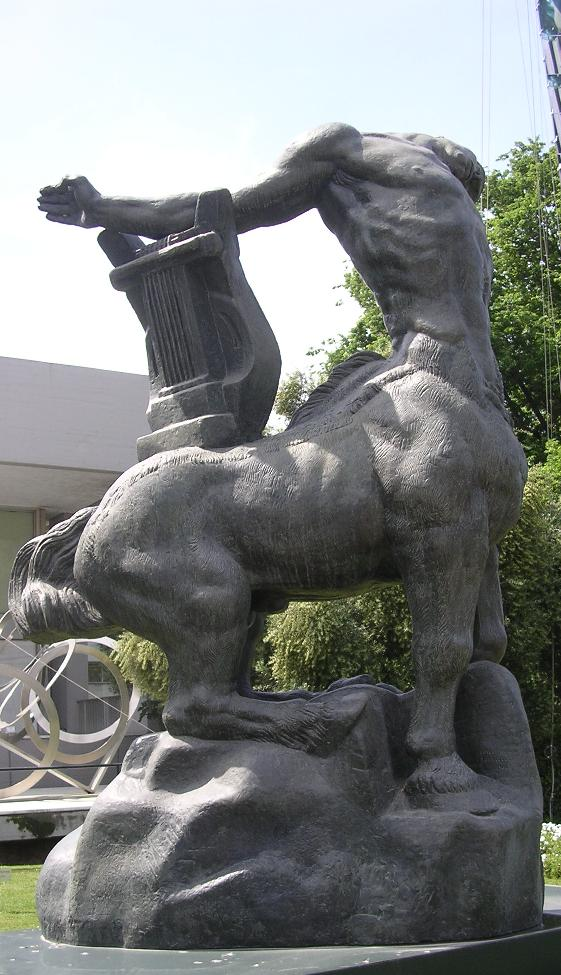
Dying Centaur by Antoine Bourdelle (1914)

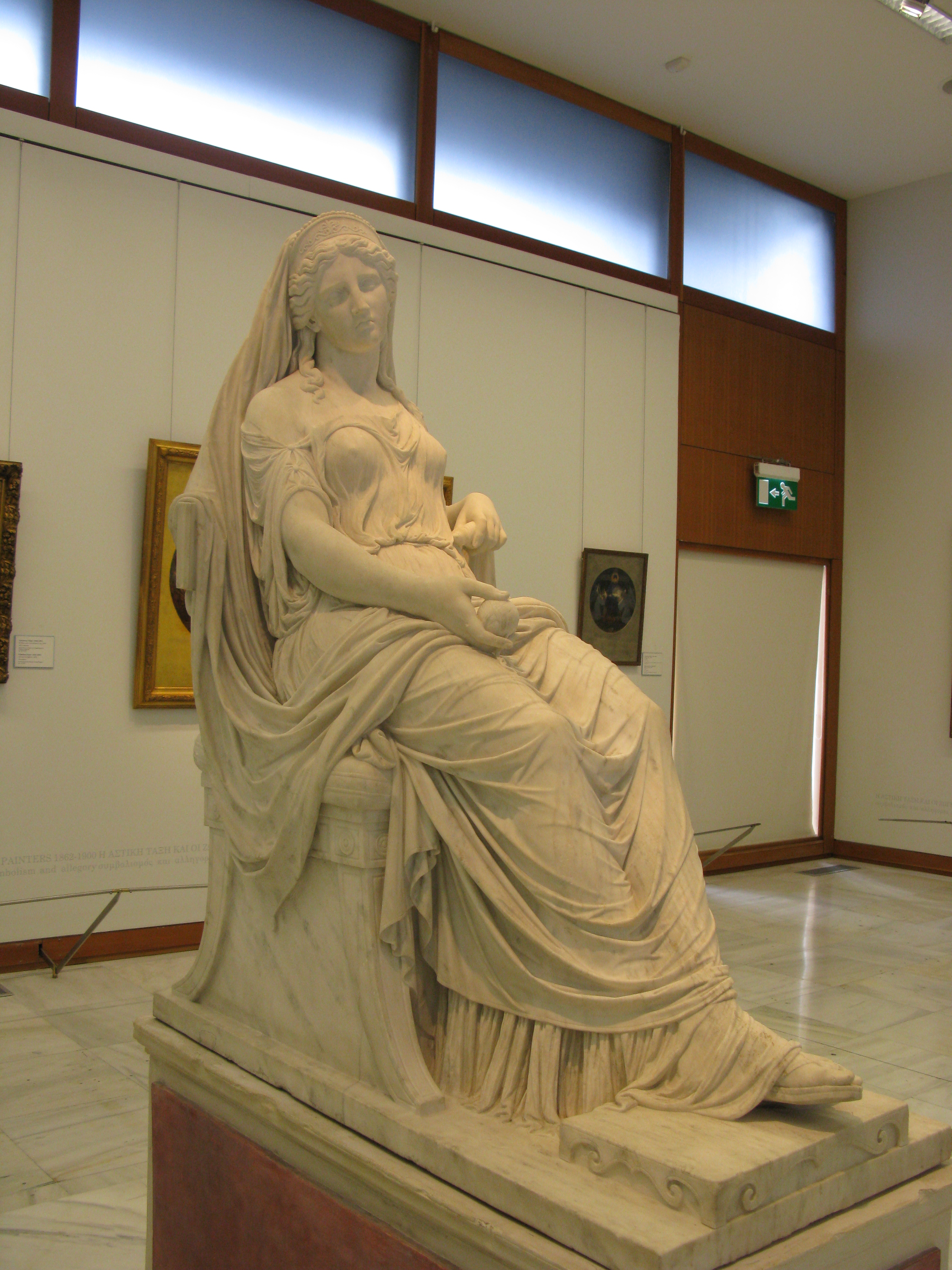
Penelope, sculpture by Leonidas Drosis

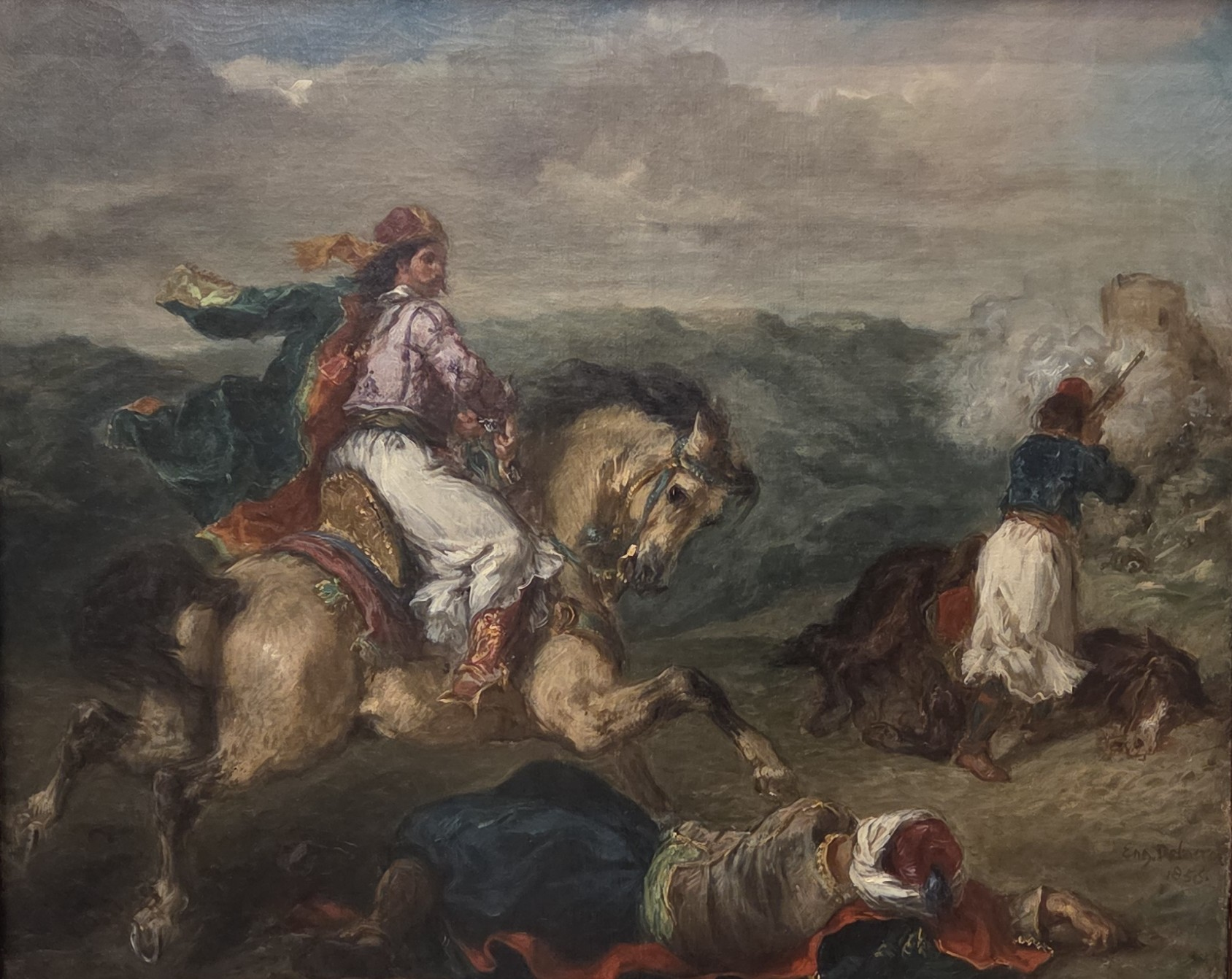
Episode of the Greek War of Independence by Eugène Delacroix

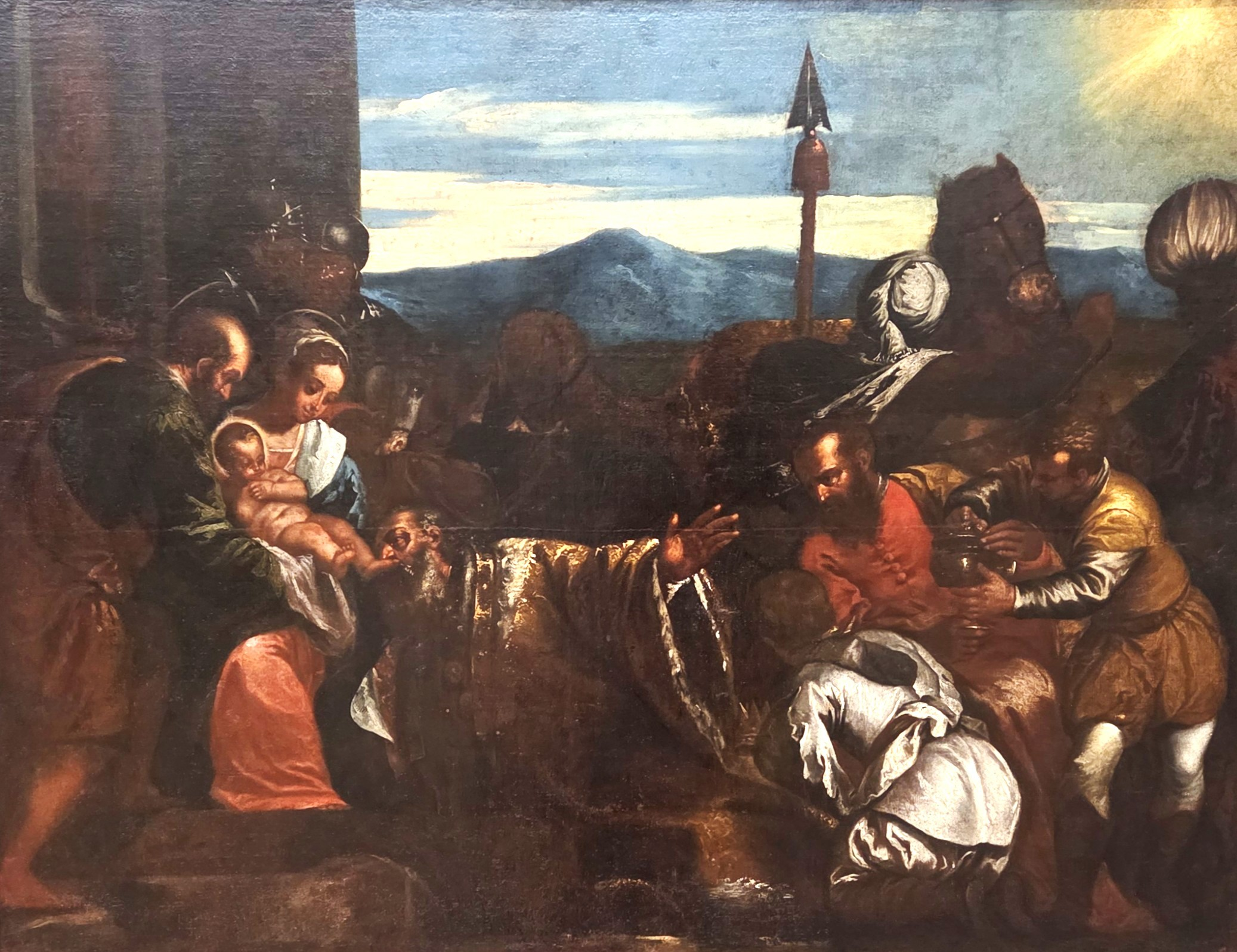
The Adoration of the Magi by Paolo Veronese

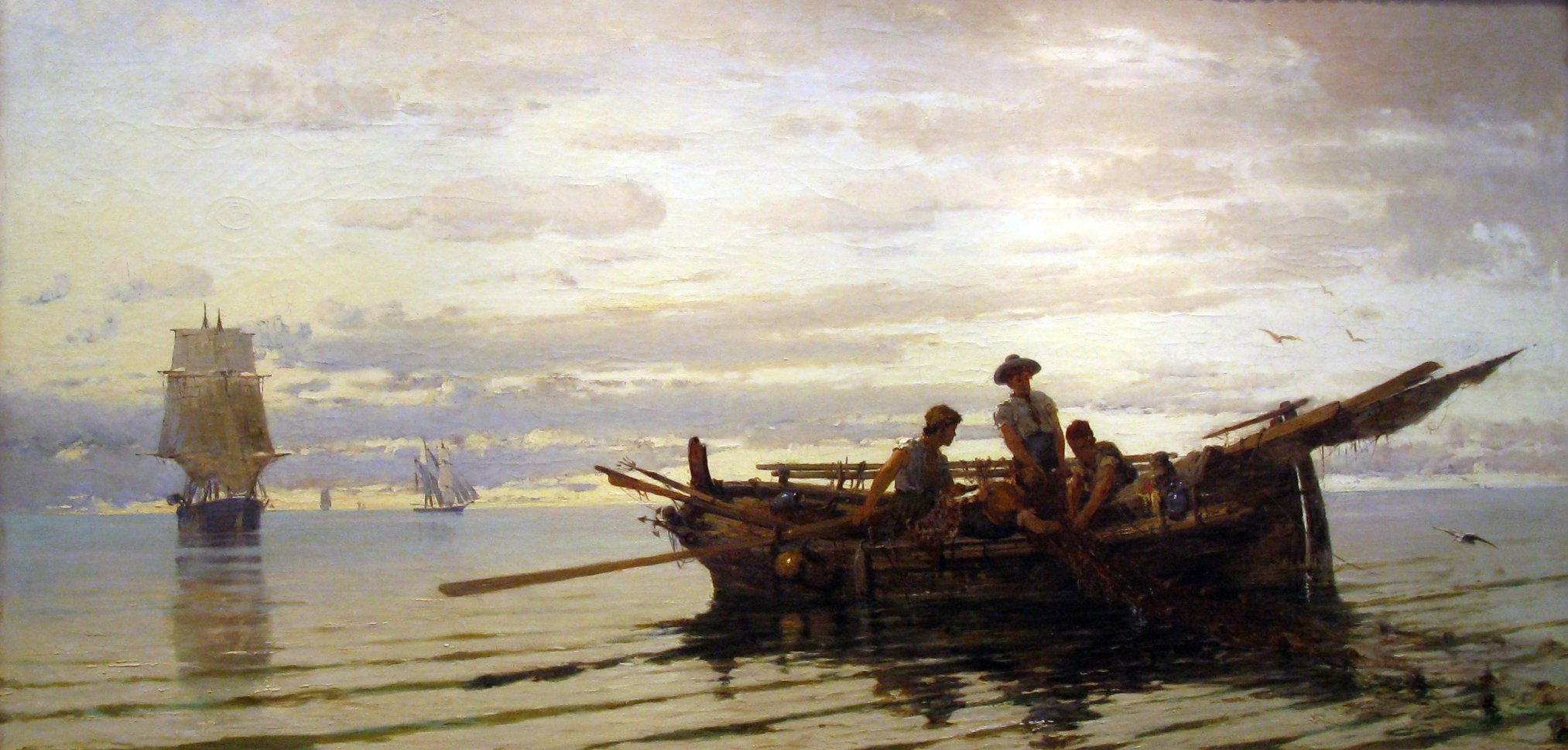
Collecting the Nets by Konstantinos Volanakis

== See also ==
- Cretan School
- Foros Timis Ston Greco
- Greek art
- List of museums in Greece
- List of national galleries
- Modern Greek art
- National Glyptotheque
