= Greek Orthodox Church of the Holy Trinity =

Historic church in South Carolina, United States

Coordinates: 32°47′52″N 79°56′55″W

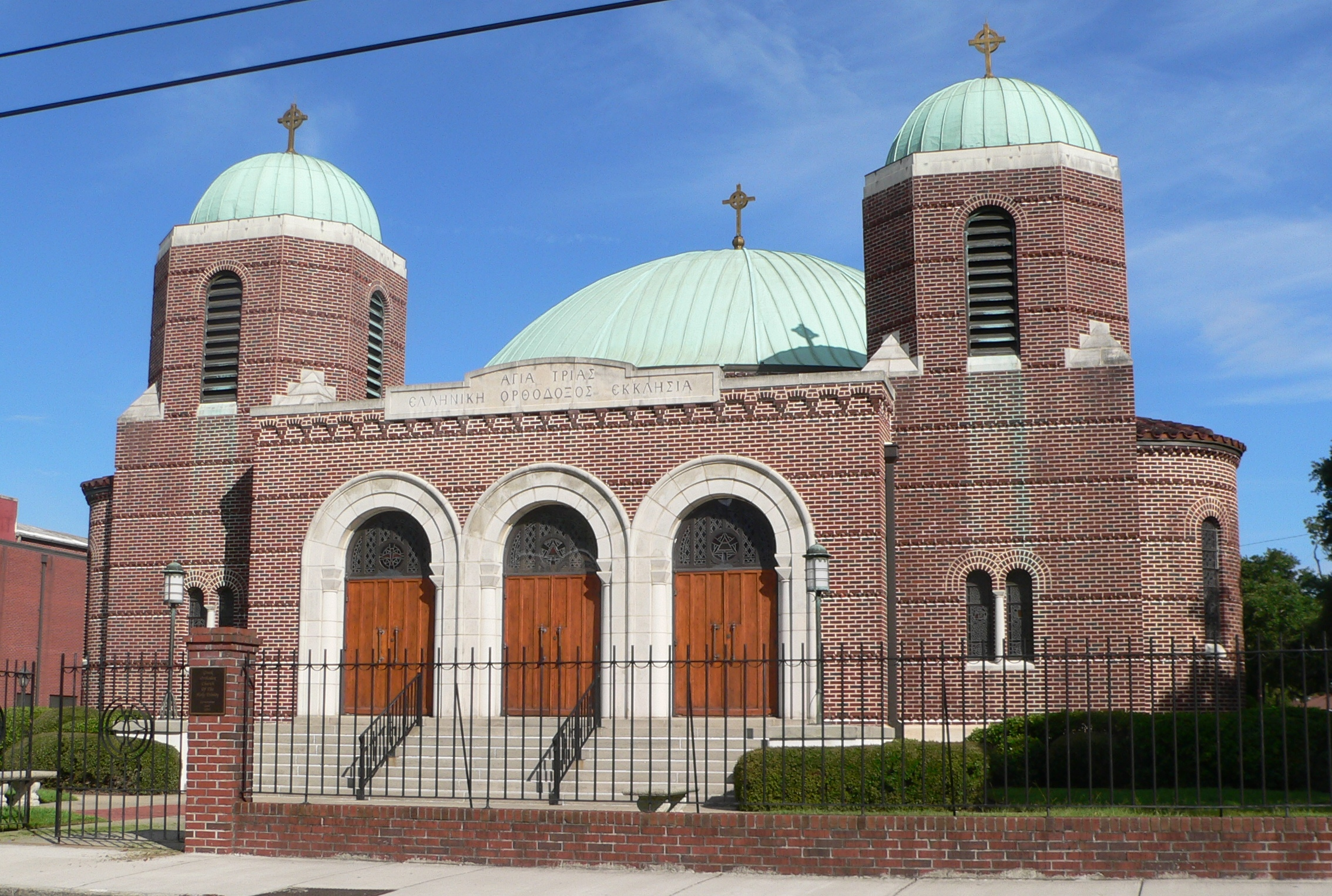

Religion
- Affiliation: Greek Orthodox

Location
- Location: Charleston, South Carolina, United States of America
- Interactive map of Greek Orthodox Church of the Holy Trinity

Architecture
- Architects: Tatum, Harold; Kontoglou, Photios
- Style: Byzantine Revival
- Completed: 1953
- Materials: brick veneer with stucco foundation and copper roof

U.S. National Register of Historic Places
- Added to NRHP: October 22, 2004
- NRHP Reference no.: 04001164

The Holy Trinity Greek Orthodox Church is located at 28 Race St., Charleston, South Carolina. The church was listed on the National Register of Historic Places in 2004. The first Greek Orthodox church in South Carolina was built in 1911 at Fishburne and St. Phillip Sts. Construction of the present church was begun in 1950 and completed in 1953.

Harold Tatum, a Penn educated Presbyterian, was selected as the church architect. Tatum designed the church in traditional Byzantine style as per the direction of Archbishop Michael of the Greek Orthodox Archdiocese of North and South America. The icons in the church are by Photios Kontoglou of Athens, Greece. The central dome was designed and constructed by the Guastavino tile Company of Woburn, Massachusetts. The church is a masterpiece of Byzantine art and architecture in the Western Hemisphere.

The parish's longest serving priest was the Rev. Nicholas Trivelas who served for nearly five decades as its pastor since his arrival in 1947. The noted Greek Orthodox theologian John G. Panagiotou served as its pastor from 2002 to 2006. The parish has had three native sons enter the ordained ministry: Danny Latto and Ernest P. Yatrelis as priests; and George Malanos as a permanent deacon.

== Sources ==
- Robert P. Stockton, Information for Guides of Historic Charleston, South Carolina 384 (1985).
