= Nikos Nikolaou =

Nikos Nokolaou
- Born: 1909; Hydra, Greece
- Died: 1986 (aged 76–77); Athens, Greece
- Education: Athens School of Fine Arts
- Known for: Sculpture

Nikos Nikolaou (Greek: Νίκος Νικολάου) (1909–1986) was a major figure in Greek art during the 20th century.

In 1929 Nikolaou was admitted into the Athens School of Fine Arts, where he studied under Konstantinos Parthenis and Umbertos Argyros.

In 1932, he had his first exhibition when he participated in the group exhibition of the Athens School of Fine Arts students. In 1935 he became a member of the group "Free Artists" (Ελεύθεροι Καλλιτέχναι) and participated in the Parnassos exhibition. That same year, Nikolaou came to the defense of a new artist, Constantine Andreou, whose artwork was so lifelike he was accused of cheating. This was the start of a lifelong friendship between the two.

In 1937, Nikolaou followed Yiannis Moralis to Italy and in 1939 he received a scholarship to study in Paris.

In 1949 he formed, with other artists including Nikos Hadjikyriakos-Ghikas, Yannis Tsarouchis, Yiannis Moralis, Nikos Engonopoulos and Panayiotis Tetsis, the "Armos" art group. This group had its first exhibition in 1950 in Athens' Zappeion.

In 1960 he moved to Aegina and his house became a meeting place for artists and others. A few years later, he managed to convince his long-time friend and colleague Andreou to buy a house on the island.

== See also ==
- Art in modern Greece
- Contemporary Greek art
