= Epameinondas Thomopoulos =

Greek artist

- Born: 1878; Patras, Greece
- Died: January 4, 1976; Athens, Greece
- Occupation: painter

Epameinondas Thomopoulos (Greek: Επαμεινώνδας Θωμόπουλος, 1878 - January 4, 1976) was a Greek artist who attended the academy and the first Greek impressionist.

He studied drawing in Italy. It was his years as professor of the arts school and for two years at a school from 1948 until 1949. In 1949, he was elected member of the Athens Academy and in 1962, he was appointed president of the same member.

Most of his works and drawings are related with nature. Many of these are preserved in the Patras city hall and the National Gallery of Greece.

In 1996, the city of Patras awarded a large spot in the National Gallery of the city.
