= Panayiotis Tetsis =

Greek painter

- Born: 1925; Hydra, Greece
- Died: 5 March 2016
- Occupation: painter

Panayiotis Tetsis (Greek: Παναγιώτης Τέτσης; 1925 – 5 March 2016) was a Greek painter. Tetsis was an exponent of the post-impressionistic seascape tradition.

== Life and work ==
Born in 1925 on the island of Hydra, where he spent his childhood and early teenage years, Tetsis moved to Piraeus in 1937.

== Legacy ==
Though the artist depicts marine themes that are familiar to him - mostly set against the backdrop of Hydra and Sifnos. “If I take a long voyage at sea, I get bored,” Tetsis says, “and I don't agree with Cavafy that headed for Ithaca we ought to hope that the voyage lasts as long as possible.” And he added: “I paint a large number of my seas from memory. I don’t need to paint them from life. And even if I do, I change them later in my studio, even changing them totally.”

Balancing discipline and emotion, Tetsis regards himself as a painter driven by the senses. His singularity, according to Koutsomallis, consists in his combination of “elegiac colour tones, compositional clarity and precision, thematic variety, a monumental character and freely, openly sketched contours”.

In 1949 Tetsis along with Nikos Hadjikyriakos-Ghikas, Yannis Moralis, Nikos Nikolaou, Nikos Engonopoulos and Yiannis Tsarouchis, established the "Armos" art group.

== See also ==
- Yiannis Tsarouchis
- Nikos Engonopoulos
- Nikos Nikolaou
- Nikos Hadjikyriakos-Ghikas
- Yannis Moralis
