= Yannis Tsarouchis Foundation Museum =

Art museum in Marousi, Athens, Greece

Coordinates: 38°03′47.8″N 23°48′5″E

Υannis Tsarouchis Foundation Museum is an art museum in Marousi, a northern suburb of Athens, Greece, dedicated to the famous Greek painter Yannis Tsarouchis. The museum is housed in the headquarters of the Foundation, which was formed in 1981, with the aim of assembling an as complete as possible collection of paintings representing all aspects of his work, to make a detailed inventory of the paintings, conserver them, organize exhibitions in the museum and participate in exhibitions organized by other institutions. There are exhibition rooms in the first floor and in the attic.
