= Odysseas Phokas =

Greek painter (1857-1946)

- Born: 1857; Romania
- Died: 1946 (aged 88–89); Athens, Greece

Odysseas Phokas (Greek: Οδυσσέας Φωκάς; 1857–1946) was a Greek painter, whose work focused on landscape painting.

== Biography ==
He was born in what is now Romania in 1857 and in 1876 he left for France to study Law in Aix-en-Provence, according to his parents' wishes. Later he began his studies on painting at the Open Academies of Paris with teachers such as Karl Cartier (1855–1925) and Raphael Collin (1850–1916).

In 1885, he moved to Athens and began working as an artist at the magazine To Asty and at the newspaper Akropolis. At the Olympic competition of 1888 he was awarded with the bronze medal, and he competed again in 1896. At the 1900 Paris World Fair, he was awarded again with the bronze medal.

From 1900 until 1940, he took part in many art exhibitions in Athens. In 1902 he exhibited his works at Smyrna, while in 1905 and 1909 he did exhibitions in Alexandria. From 1907 until 1910 he lived, for family reasons, in Romania, where he also exhibited his works. From 1915 until his death, he worked as curator and art restorer at the National Gallery of Athens.

== Artistic work ==
Phokas, even if he studied under representatives of the French Academism Movement, with his works he is credited amongst many others as an ambassador of Impressionism in Greece. His landscape paintings are noted for their sensitivity and their diffused light, which contrasts the darkness of the Academists. Main sources of his artworks were landscapes of Attica and Romania. In 1917 and 1919, he took part in the exhibits of the Nikolaos Lytras' team "Tehni", however, without ever becoming a member of the team. From 1915 until the end of his life he worked at the National Gallery of Athens, to which he bequeathed all his properties along with his own private art collection.
