= The Entombment of Christ (El Greco) =

Painting by El Greco

- Santo Entierro (Spanish)
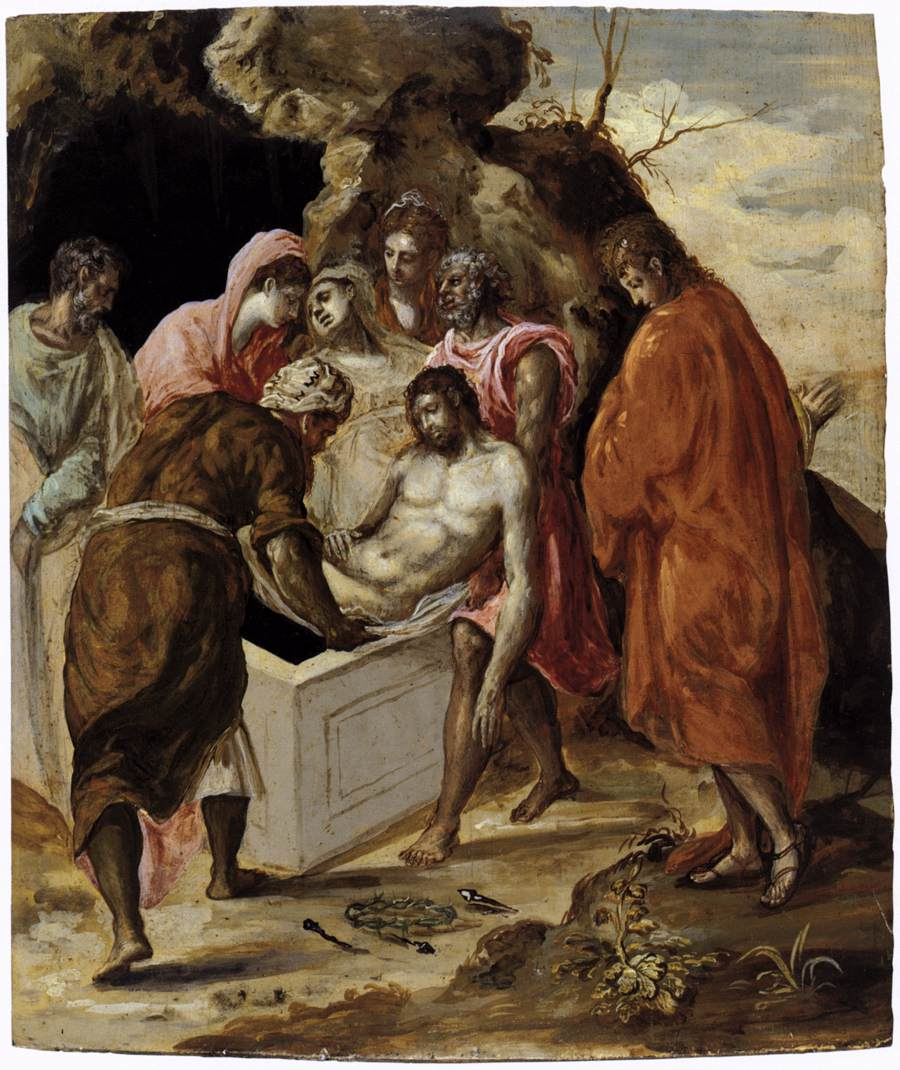
- Artist: El Greco
- Year: 1570-1576
- Medium: oil on canvas
- Dimensions: 51 cm × 43 cm (20 in × 17 in)
- Location: Alexandros Soutzos Museum; Athens

The Entombment of Christ is an oil painting by El Greco, painted between 1570 and 1576. It is preserved in the Alexandros Soutzos Museum.

== Analysis ==
It belongs to the Roman period of El Greco. The scene takes place in a cave, where the figures are silhouetted against a dark background and craggy rocks. A character back introduces the public to the composition, a mannerist style. the strong influence of Michelangelo is seen in the face of Christ to the apostles.

El Greco manages to convey the feelings of sadness and desolation of the holy women. His ability as a portraitist is demonstrated by playing with sienna and blue hues.

== See also ==
- List of works by El Greco

== Bibliography ==
- Álvarez Lopera, José (2005). El Greco. Madrid: Arlanza. ISBN 9788495503350.
- Schloz-Hänsel, Michael (2003). El Greco. Colonia: Taschen. ISBN 978-3-8228-3173-1.
