= Konstantinos Maleas =

Greek painter

Konstantinos Maleas Κωνσταντίνος Μαλέας
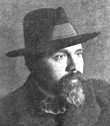
- Born: 1879; Constantinople, Ottoman Empire
- Died: 1928 (aged 48–49); Athens, Greece
- Occupation: painter

Konstantinos Maleas (Κωνσταντίνος Μαλέας) (Constantinople, 1879 - Athens, 1928) was one of the most important Post-Impressionist Greek painters of the 20th century. Along with Konstantinos Parthenis, he is sometimes considered Greece's most important modern artist.

== Biography ==
Maleas was born and grew up in Constantinople, far away from the Greek artistic centre in Athens. The young painter avoided therefore the influence of the Munich School that dominated Athenian Art. He studied at the Phanar Greek Orthodox College and then left for Paris in 1901 at an age of 23 years to study initially architecture. In Paris he eventually decided to study painting until 1908 with Henri Martin.

In 1913 he returned to Greece, initially in Thessaloniki and then based in Athens. In 1917 he became founding member of the avant-garde art group Ομάδα Τέχνη, which imported the international contemporary art movements of the time to Greece. He travelled extensively in Greece, Western Europe, Palestine and Egypt where he drew some of the subjects for his famous landscapes. Apart from painting, he was also involved in public discussion of the modernisation of the Greek language. He was a friend of Glenos, Delmouzos and Triantafylidis. He illustrated the first alphabet book in the new modern Greek language Demotiki (Αλφαβητάρι με τον ήλιο), and wrote articles for newspapers such as Nouma, Elefthero Vima, as well as writing for a number of art journals. Maleas was recognised for his artistic contribution by the Greek Government, which awarded him its 'Highest Acknowledgement of Letters and Arts'.

== Work ==
Maleas work was influenced by the work of Paul Cézanne, Paul Gauguin, Vincent van Gogh, and by the art movements of symbolism, Impressionism and Fauvism. His paintings are characterised by very light and bright colours, the large brushes that revolutionalised the stagnant Athenian art of the time. Most art critics condemned his work, and it was only Fotos Politis that recognised the value of Maleas's work, also urging young artists to learn from his paintings. Maleas remains one of the most popular Greek modern artists, and his works are exhibited at the National Gallery of Athens and elsewhere.

== Gallery ==
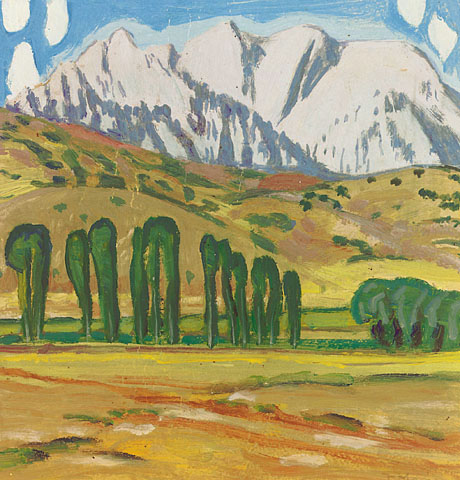
Attica Greek Parliament

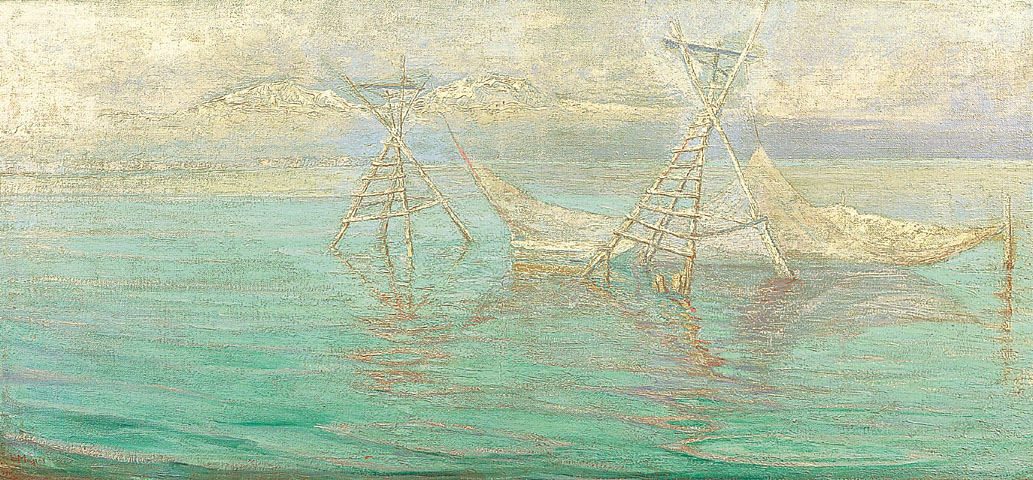
Nets Greek Parliament

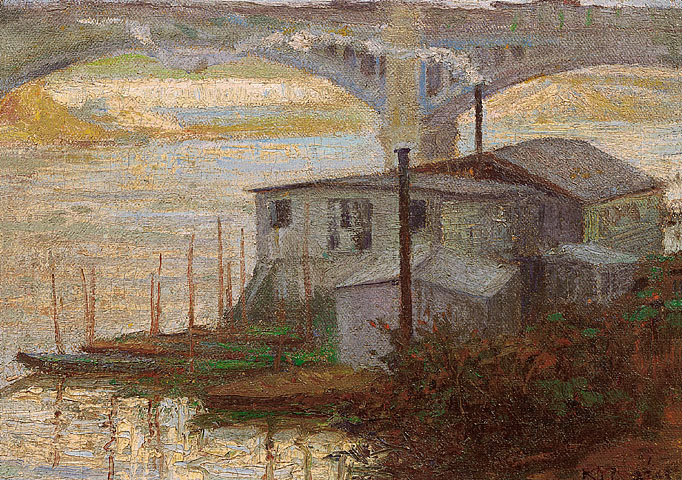
Seine in Arganteille Greek Parliament

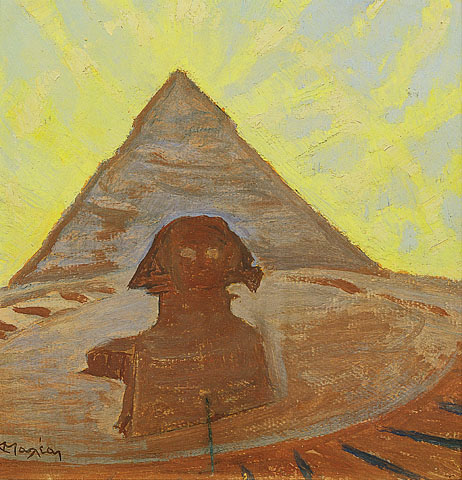
In Egypt Greek Parliament

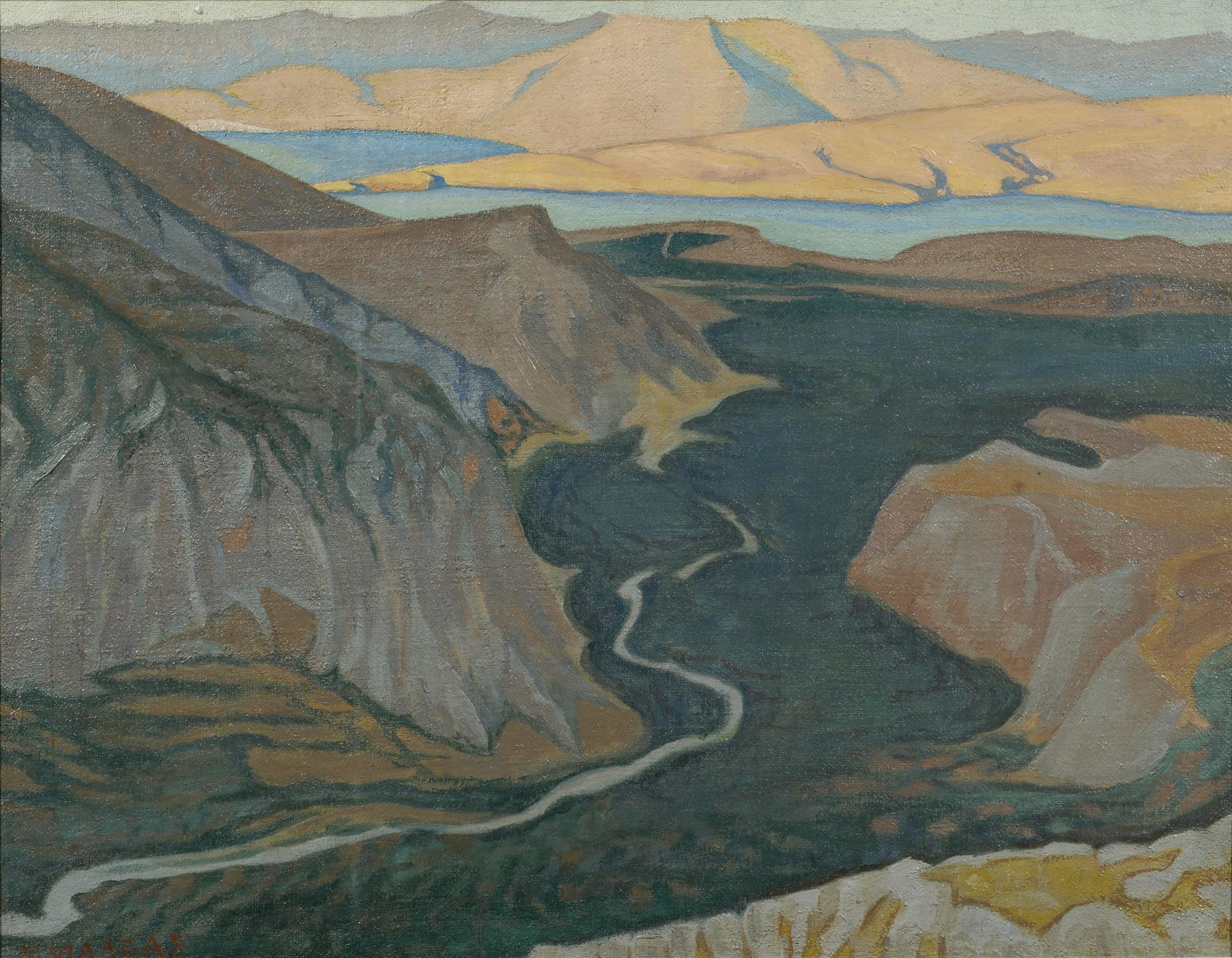
Delphi National Gallery of Athens

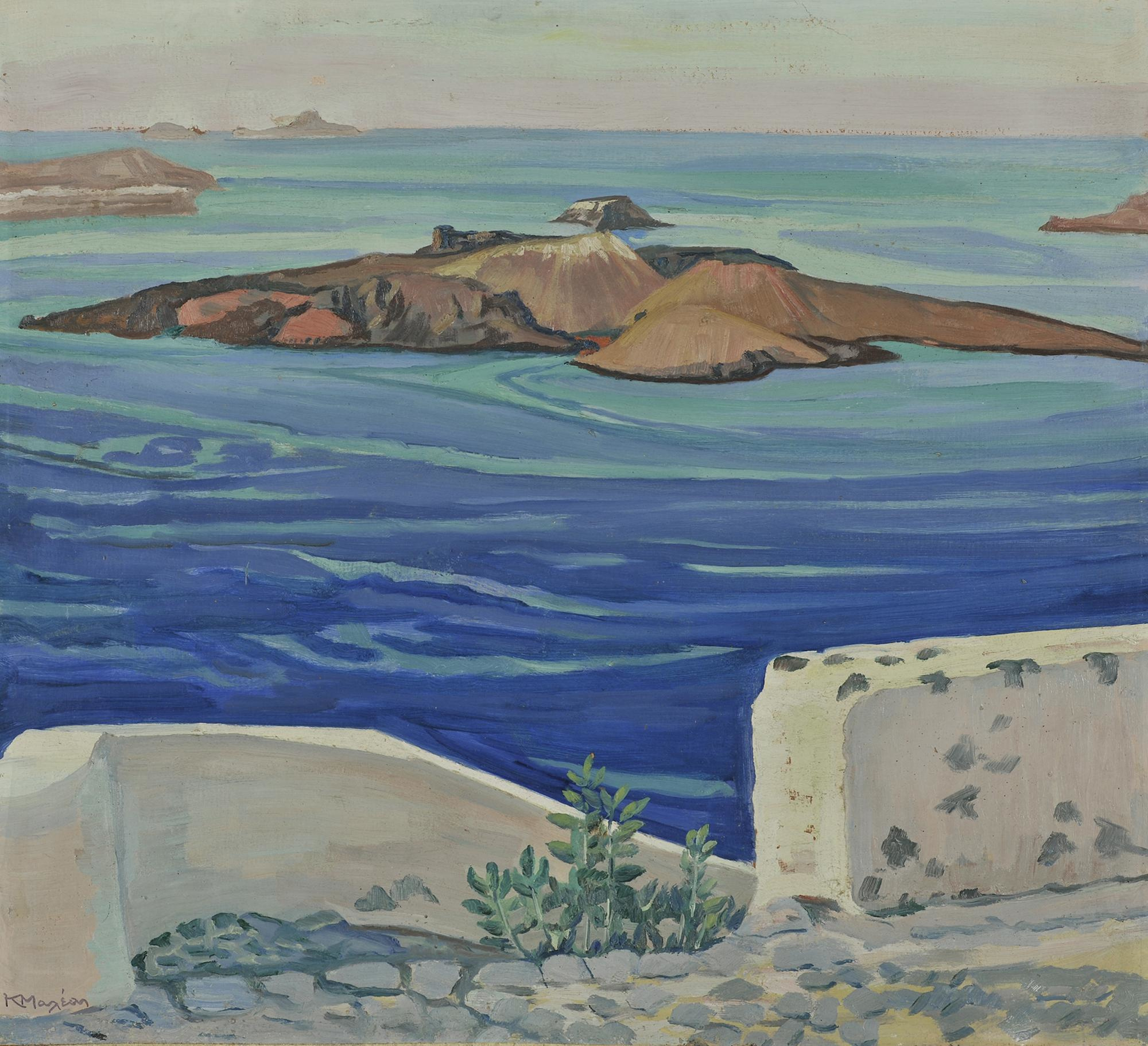
Santorini National Gallery of Athens

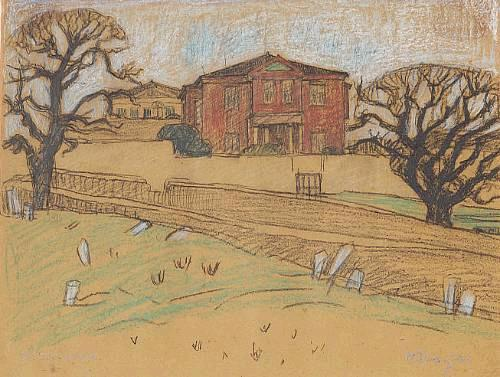
House in Lesbos

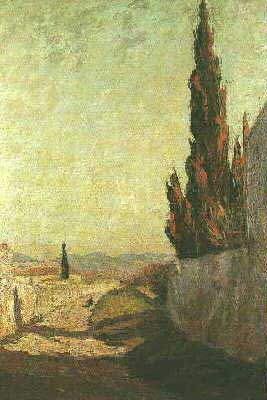
Cypresses

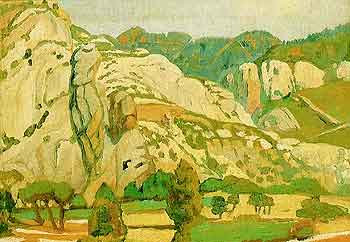
Kalavryta

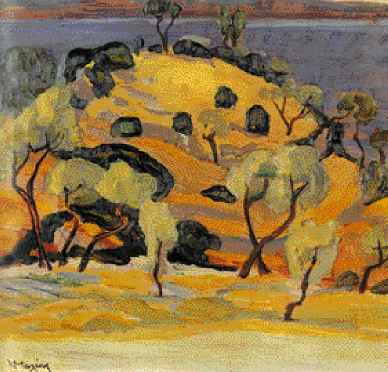
Sounion (1918-1920)

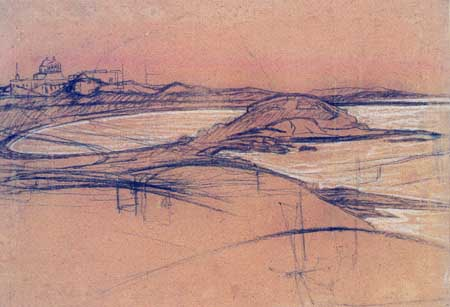
Sea side

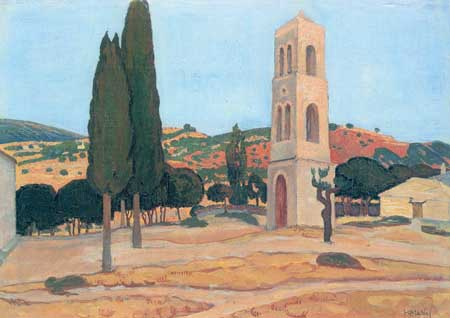
Landscape

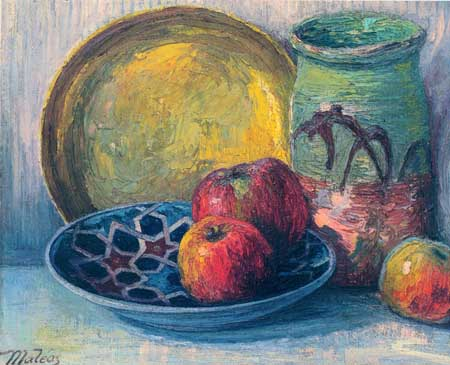
Still life

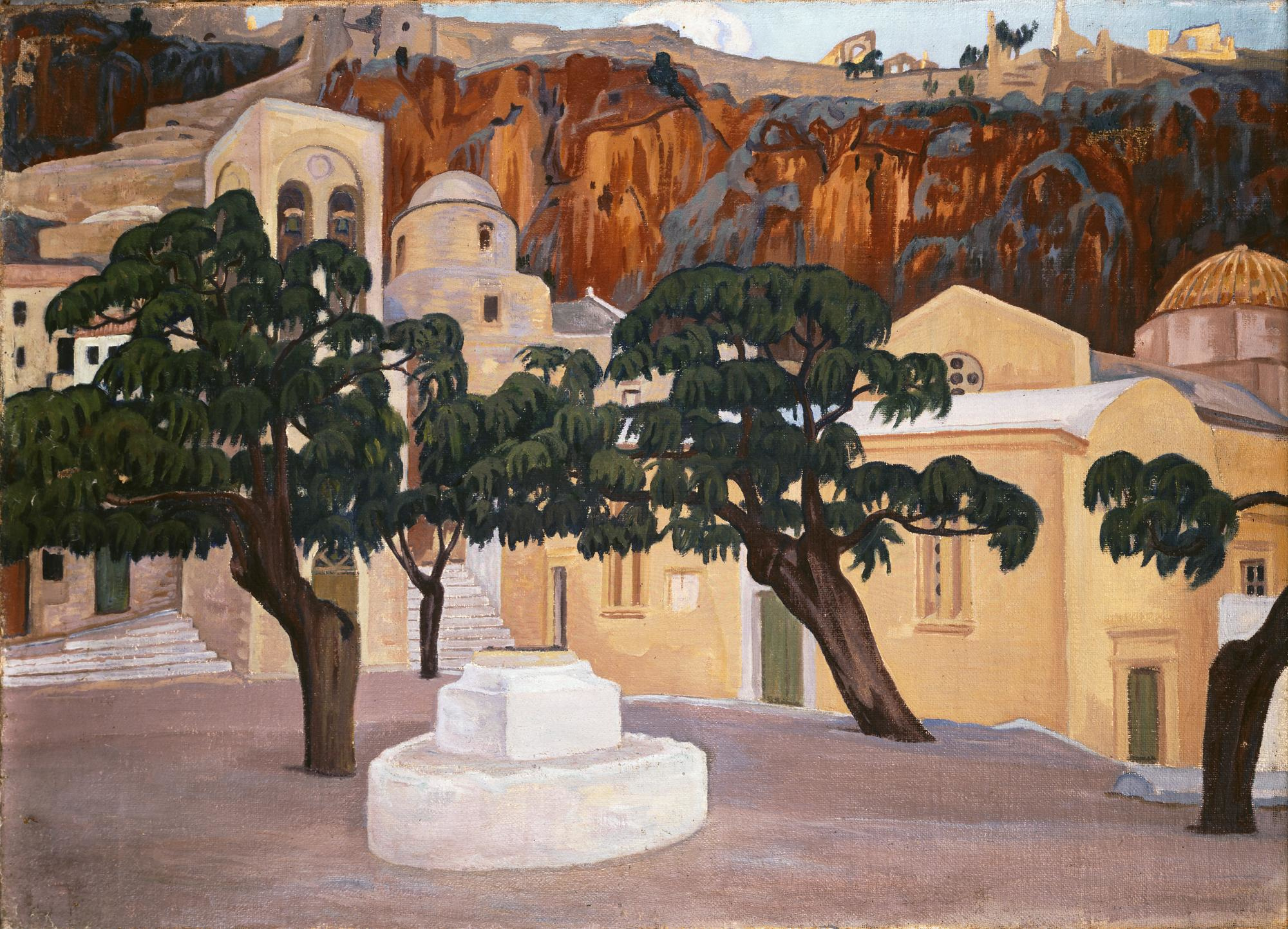
Monemvasia (1918-1923) National Gallery of Athens

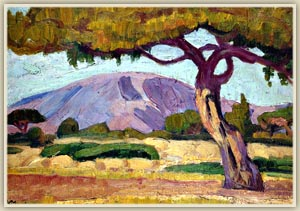
Landscape of Attica (1920) Municipal Museum of Athens

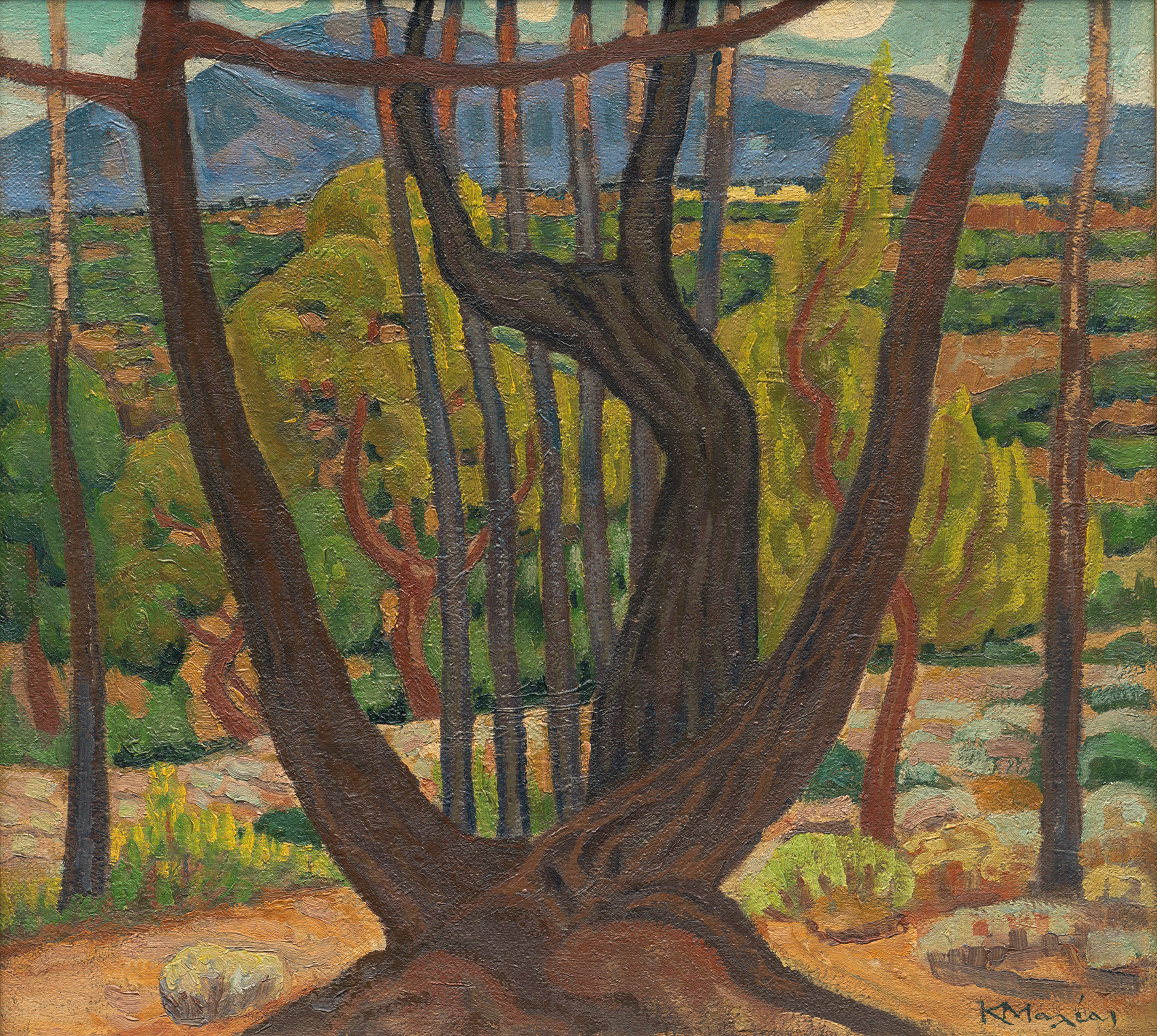
Lyre Aristotle University of Thessaloniki

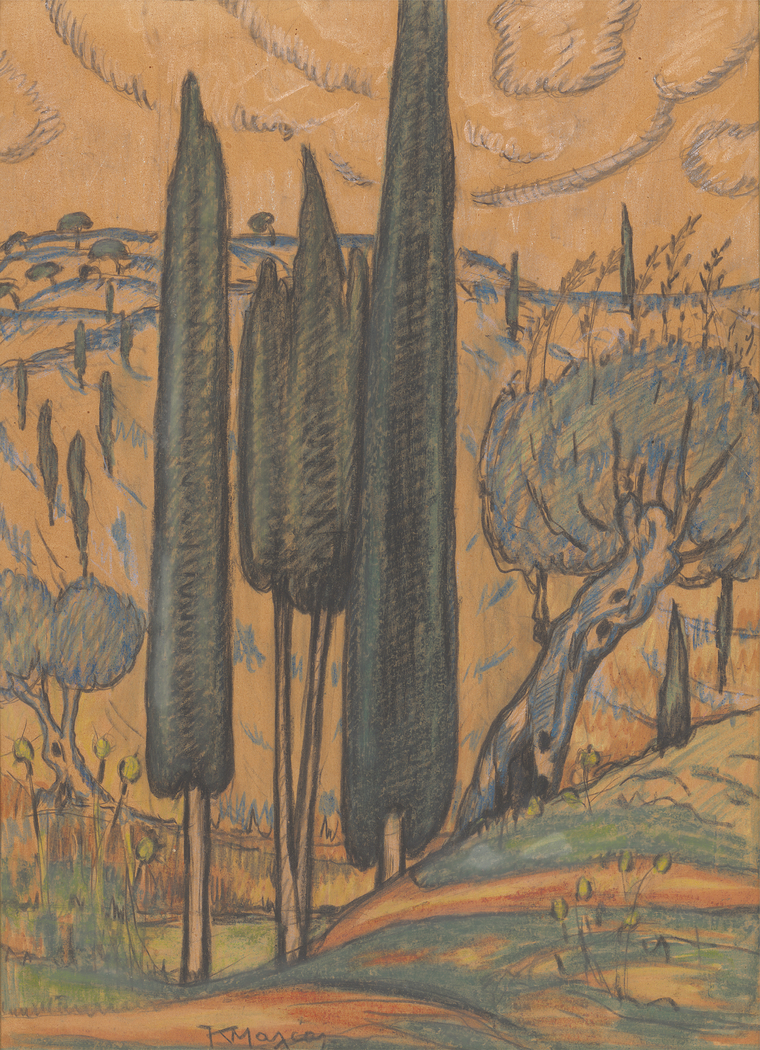
Landscape with cypresses Aristotle University of Thessaloniki

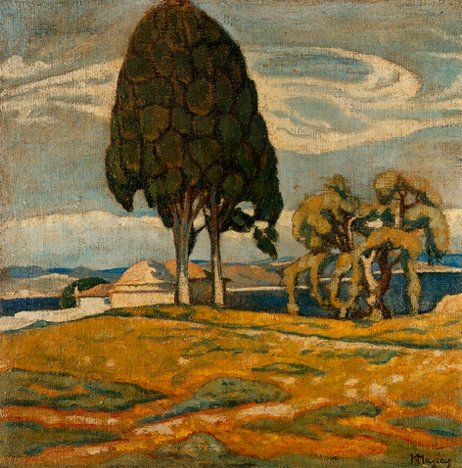
Church between the trees (1920)

== See also ==
- Munich School
- National Gallery of Athens
