= Photis Kontoglou =

Greek writer and painter

Kontoglou's signature.

Photis Kontoglou (Greek: Φώτης Κόντογλου, the pen name of Φώτης Αποστολέλης (Photis Apostolelis); Aivali, 8 November 1895 – Athens, 13 July 1965) was a Greek writer, painter and icon painter.

== Biography ==
He was raised by his mother, Despoina Kontoglou, and his uncle Stefanos Kontoglou, who was abbot in the nearby monastery of Aghia Paraskevi. He spent his childhood among the monastery, the sea and the fishermen. In 1913, he enrolled at the Athens School of Fine Arts. In 1923, he stayed for some time at the monasteries of Mount Athos, where he discovered the technique of Byzantine iconography. Two years later, he married Maria Hatzikambouri, who was also from Aivali/Kydoniai (modern day Ayvalık, Turkey) and moved to Greece in 1922.

In 1923 he made his first painting exposition in Mytilene, with Konstantinos Maleas.

In 1933, he was invited by the Egyptian government to work for the Coptic Museum. However, he decided to stay in Athens and he delivered classes of painting at the National and Kapodistrian University of Athens. Among his students were some of the most important modern Greek painters.

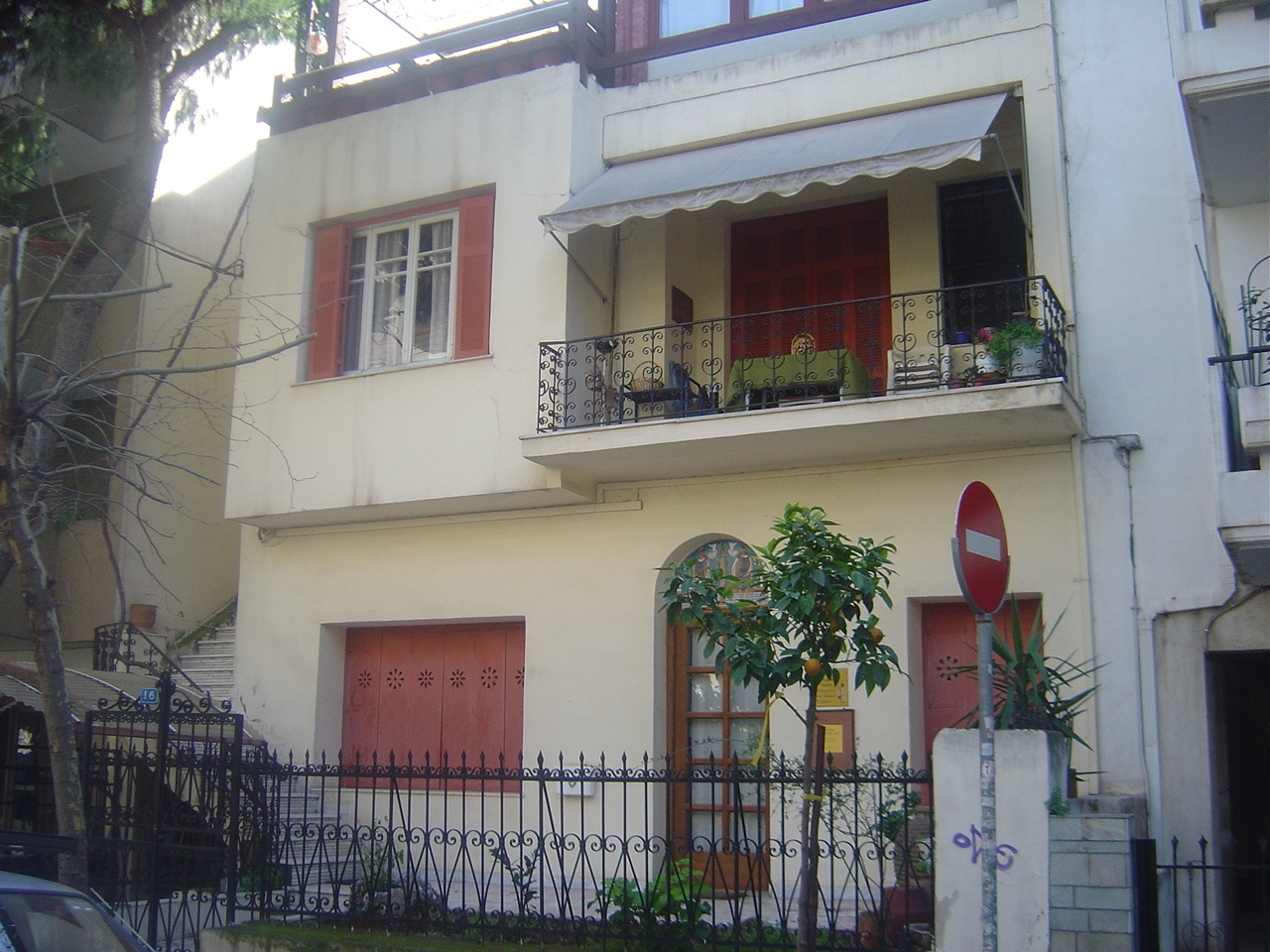
Photis Kontoglou's house in Athens

Kontoglou was for a time a resident in Paris, where he received a prize for the illustrations he made for Knut Hamsun's book Famine. However, it was his illustrations for his own book, Pedro Kazas, that made him famous.

Kontoglou was a particularly productive artist. A devout Orthodox Christian, he undertook the restoration of the frescos of the Perivleptos church in Mystras which, along with the Cretan icon painters in the years after the fall of Constantinople (1453), he considered to be the very best of the Iconographers' work and a model for his own work. Furthermore, he painted frescos in various churches all around Greece; among them the Kapnikarea church in Athens. He also painted the monumental fresco of the Ecumenical Patriarchs of Constantinople at the town hall of Athens and frescoes for Zoodochos Peghi at Liopesi (Paiania), the Church of Saint Andrew off Patission Street in Athens, the Metropolitan Church of Evangelismos in Rhodes and the Church of Saint George at Stemnitsa in Arcadia. Churches in Athens frescoes by Kontoglou include Saint George at Kypseli, Saint Haralambos in the park Pedion tou Areos and Saint Nicholas at Kato Patissia. Kontoglou was also the original iconographer of the main iconography at the Greek Orthodox Church of the Holy Trinity in Charleston, South Carolina.

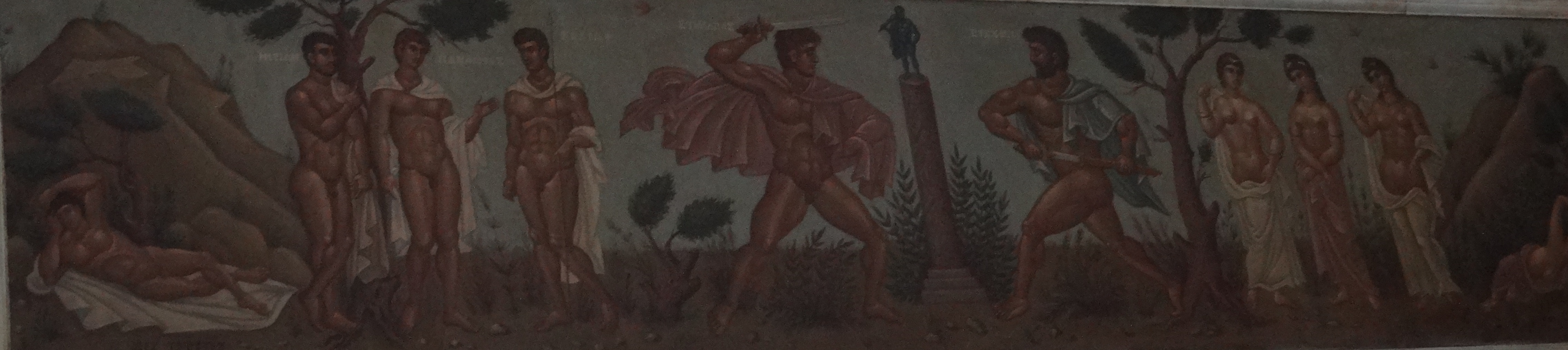
Murals in the Municipality of Athens by Kontoglou, 1938.

The iconography on the dome and other areas of the Archdiocesan Cathedral of the Holy Trinity in New York City was created by Georgios Gliatas, a student of Kontoglou. Other notable students include Rallis Kopsides.

Kontoglou also wrote various works of literature as well as numerous essays, winning the Academy of Athens Prize for his book Ekphrasis published in 1961, championing orthodoxy but also criticising moves by the then Patriarch Athenagoras towards ecumenism, which he believed would compromise Orthodox values.

Kontoglou died in 1965.
