= Nikos Engonopoulos =

Greek painter and poet (1907–1985)

- Νίκος Εγγονόπουλος
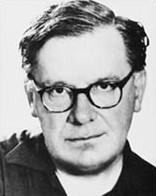
- Born: October 21, 1907; Athens, Greece
- Died: October 31, 1985 (aged 78); Athens, Greece
- Known for: Painting, poetry
- Movement: Surrealism, Generation of the '30s

Nikos Engonopoulos (Greek: Νίκος Εγγονόπουλος; October 21, 1907 – October 31, 1985) was a Greek painter and poet. He was one of the most important members of "Generation of the '30s", as well as a major representative of the surrealist movement in Greece. His work as a writer also includes critique and essays.

== Biography ==
Nikos Engonopoulos was born in Athens in 1907 and was the second son of Panagiotis and Errietti (Henrietta) Engonopoulos. During the summer of 1914, when Engonopoulos' family went on a trip to Constantinople were obliged to settle there, due to the outbreak of World War I. In 1923, he was enrolled in a lycée in Paris, where he studied for a period of four years. After his return to Greece, he joined the Army in order to fulfil the mandatory military service. Later on, he worked as a translator in a bank and as a secretary at the University of Athens. From 1930 to 1933 Engonopoulos worked as a designer in the Urban Planning Department of the Greek Ministry of Public Works.

In 1932 he joined the Athens School of Fine Arts, where he studied under Konstantinos Parthenis, Dimitrios Biskinis, Thomas Thomopoulos and Yannis Kefallinos. He also attended classes at the art studio of Photis Kontoglou and studied Byzantine art under Andreas Xyngopoulos. During that time he met important artists like the poet Andreas Embirikos and the painters Yannis Tsarouchis, Giorgio de Chirico and Yannis Moralis. Later Engonopoulos credited Embirikos and de Chirico as his major surrealist influences.

His first paintings, mostly temperas on paper depicting old houses, were presented at an Art of Modern Greek Tradition exhibition, organised in January 1938. Soon after the exhibition, he published translations of poems by Tristan Tzara, which were published in February. A few months later, his first collection of poems (Do Not Distract the Driver) was published, followed by a second one (The Clavicembalos of Silence) the next year. Overall he is considered one of the finest surrealist poets of Greece.

Engonopoulos made his first individual exhibition in 1939. Three years later, he finished his most popular long poem Bolivar, a Greek Poem, inspired by the revolutionary leader Simón Bolívar and published in 1944. The poem was also released in the form of a song, in 1968, with music composed by Nikos Mamangakis. After the Second World War he became one of the founding members of the Art group Armos. In 1954, he was selected to represent Greece in Biennale of Venice and the following year later, he participated in the Biennale of São Paulo. In 1958, he won the First Poetry Award of the Greek Ministry of Education and in 1966 received the Gold Cross of George I for his contribution to Arts. In 1967 he was elected professor of painting at the National Technical University of Athens, and held this position until 1973 when he retired.

He died of a heart attack in 1985 in Athens. Engonopoulos was married twice; first he married the artist Nelly Andrikopoulou from 1950 to 1954 and in 1960 till death he married Eleni Tsiokou with whom he had one daughter.

Engonopoulos is considered as the introducer of the Greek surrealism and also its main representative. His works are noted for the combination of elements from tradition, history, religion and the contemporary period mixed with his own sarcastic attitude. Engonopoulos' paintings are held in public and private collections such as the National Gallery of Greece, Benaki Museum, the Teloglion Fine Arts Foundation, the Museum of Modern Greek Art of Rhodes etc.

== See also ==
- Andreas Embirikos
- Art in modern Greece
- National Gallery of Greece

== Sources ==
- The Official Nikos Engonopoulos website
- Eleni Kefala, Peripheral (Post) Modernity, Peter Lang, 2007.
- Takis Mavrotas (ed.), Νίκος Εγγονόπουλος. Ο Ορφέας του Υπερρεαλισμού, The B & M Theocharakis Foundation for the Fine Arts and Music, 2022.
