= Marina Lambraki-Plaka =

Greek historian, archaeologist, and academic (c. 1939–2022)

Marina Lambraki-Plaka (c. 1939 – 13 June 2022) was a Greek historian, archaeologist, and academic.

Born in Greece.

She was the director of the National Gallery from 1992 to 2022.

She served as Alternate Minister of Culture in the Caretaker Cabinet of Vassiliki Thanou-Christophilou.

== Publications ==
- Classical Memories in Modern Greek Art (Onassis Cultural Center, Olympic Tower / Alexander S. Onassis Public Benefit Foundation, 2000)
- Paris-Athenes 1863-1940 (with Olga Mentzafou-Polyzou; Pinacotheque Nationale et Musee Alexandros Soutzos, 2006)
