= Yannis Tsarouchis =

Greek painter

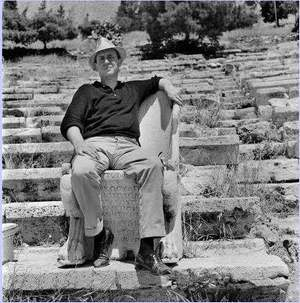
- Tsarouchis in a picture by Dimitri Papadimos
- Born: 13 January 1910; Piraeus, Kingdom of Greece
- Died: 20 July 1989 (aged 79); Athens, Greece
- Occupation: painter

Yannis Tsarouchis (Greek: Γιάννης Τσαρούχης; 13 January 1910 – 20 July 1989) was a Greek modernist painter and set designer who achieved international fame, and was "known in particular for his homoerotic subjects," including soldiers, sailors, and nude males.

== Biography ==
=== Early life ===
Born in Piraeus, he studied at the Athens School of Fine Arts (1929–1935). He was also a student of Photios Kontoglou, who introduced him to Byzantine iconography, while he also studied popular architecture and dressing customs. Together with Dimitris Pikionis, Kontoglou and Angeliki Hatzimichali he led the movement for the introduction of Greek tradition in painting.

From 1935 to 1936 he visited Istanbul, Paris and Italy. He came in contact with the Renaissance art and Impressionism. He discovered the works of Theophilos Hatzimihail and met influential artists such as Henri Matisse and Alberto Giacometti.

=== Work ===
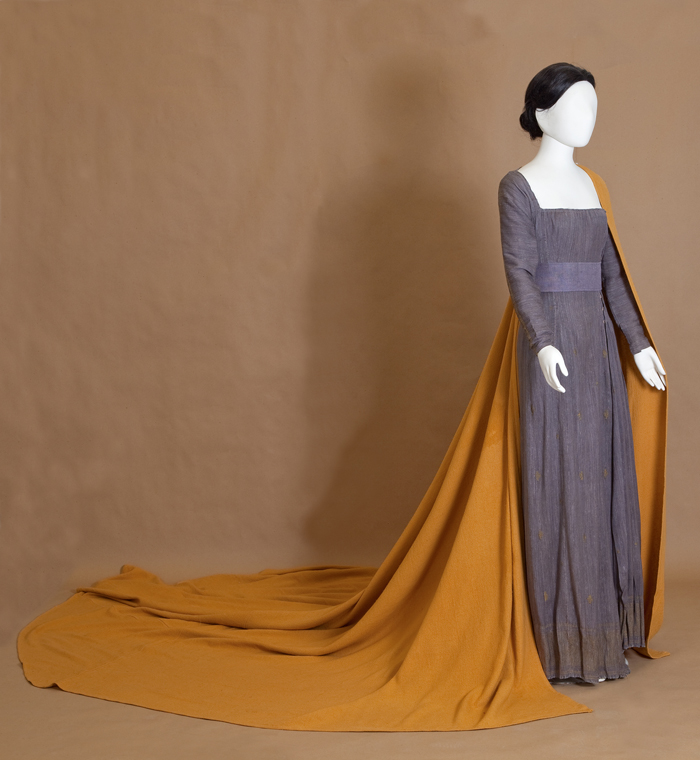
Maria Callas' theatrical costume by Yiannis Tsarouchis (1958, collection of Peloponnesian Folklore Foundation, Nauplio)

He returned to Greece in 1936 and two years later he produced his first personal exhibition in Athens. He later fought in the Greco-Italian War in 1940. In 1949, he and other artists, including Nikos Hadjikyriakos-Ghikas, Yannis Moralis, Nikos Nikolaou, Nikos Engonopoulos and Panayiotis Tetsis, established the "Armos" art group. In 1951 he had exhibitions in Paris and London. In 1958 he participated in the Venice Biennale. In 1967 he moved to Paris.

Tsarouchis "filled his canvases with homoerotic images of vulnerable men and (to a much lesser extent) strong women."

Sylvester & Orphanos published Yannis Tsarouchis: The Face of Modern Greece.

=== Institutions ===
In 1982 the Yannis Tsarouchis Foundation Museum in Maroussi, Athens, was inaugurated. The Museum is actually hosted in the house of the artist.

He died in Athens in 1989.

== List of Works ==
- Cafe Neon (Night)
