= Yiannis Moralis =

Greek visual artist (1916–2009)

Yiannis Moralis (Greek: Γιάννης Μόραλης; also transliterated Yannis Moralis or Giannis Moralis; 23 April 1916 – 20 December 2009) was an important Greek visual artist and part of the so-called "Generation of the '30s". He is a person who carried weight in many fields and found himself to be equally au courant. Furthermore, he exhibited a strong sense of responsibility when it came to confronting modern day problems. His art is distinct for the esoteric nature of its forms and its capacity and ability to suggest space.

== Biography ==
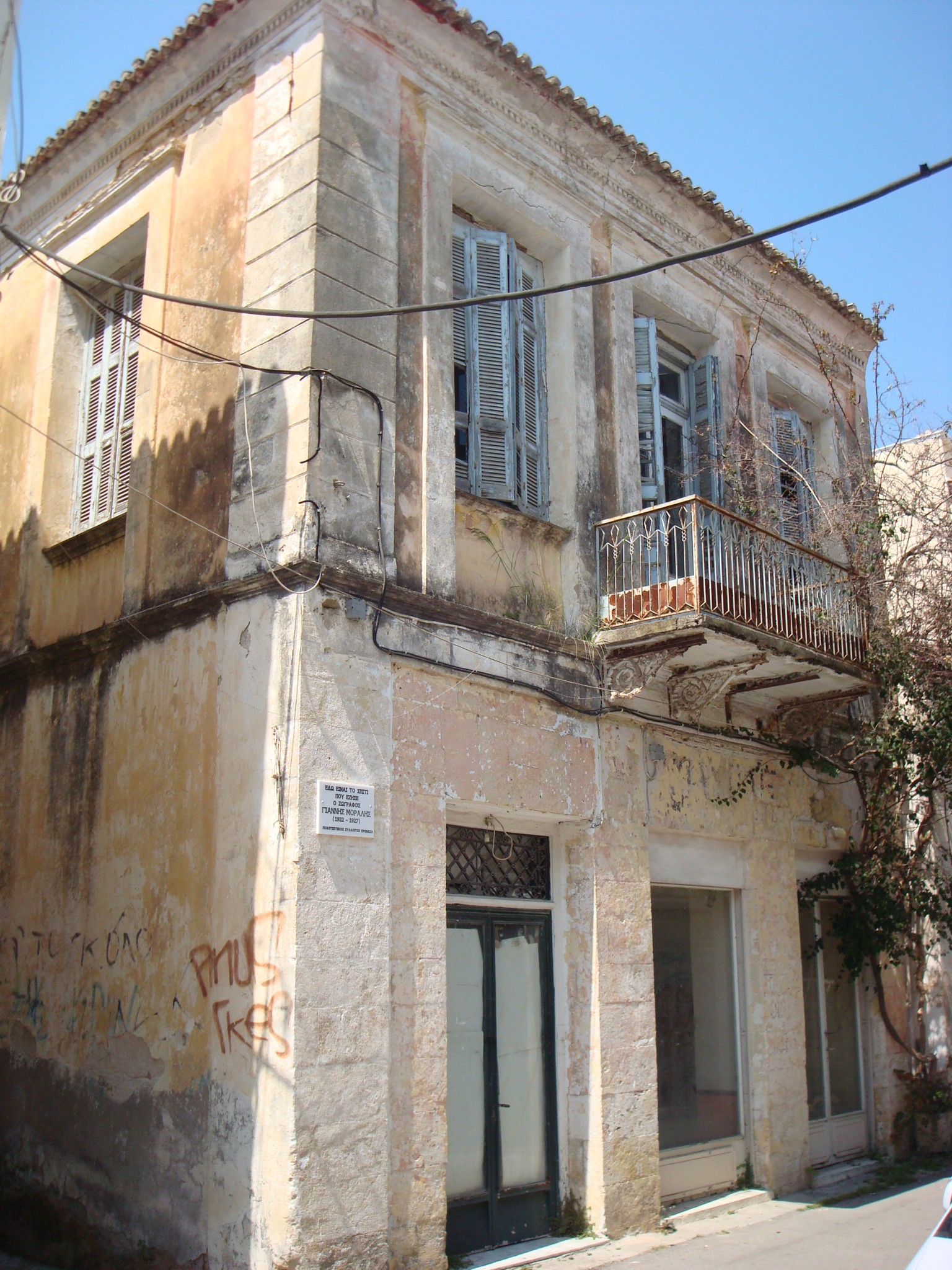
The house Greek painter Yiannis Moralis lived in Preveza, between 1922 and 1927

Yiannis Moralis was born on the 23rd of April 1916 in Arta, Greece, the second of four children, the rest being Olga, Theodora and Yiorgos. Six years later in 1922, his family moved to Preveza, where Moralis's father, Konstadinos Moralis was appointed headmaster of the local Gymnasium there and five years following that [ in 1927] they settled in Athens. By that time, Yiannis had already decided that he was going to be a painter, and so, along with his regular schooling, he attended Sunday classes at the Athens School of Fine Arts with his father.

Not long after turning 15 years old in 1931, he studied under painter Yiannis Yeorgopoulos and later his brother-in-law to prepare for the Athens School of Fine Arts entrance examination, where he passed and enrolled in the Preparatory Class under painter Dimitris Yeraniotis, where, soon afterwards, he was admitted to the studio of Umvertos Argyros. The coming year [in 1932], he took part in the Athens School of Fine Arts Students Exhibition where there was enthusiastic critical notice over his work.

In 1933 he began attending afternoon classes at the recently opened engraving workshop of Yiannis Kephallinos which was also attended by other students. Not long After in 1936 he graduated from the Athens School of Fine Arts and throughout his entire time there, he had been noted for his dedication and industry and was at the receiving end of a plethora of awards and commendations. Later that year he took part in the Exhibition of Greek Engraving in Czechoslovakia, where his wood engravings attracted a considerable amount of attention. He ended up winning the competition for a scholarship awarded to him by the Academy of Athens from the Ourania Konstadinidou legacy, for studying mosaic out of state.

In March 1937, his father died. He was a figure who had greatly influenced the formation of Yiannis's character and majorly affected his decision to pursue a career in art. Three months later on June 16 he left for Rome, accompanied by fellow student and painter Nikos Nikolaou in fulfillment of their friendly pact that if either of them were to win the scholarship they would travel abroad together to continue their studies. Five months following his move to Rome on November 17 he settled in Paris where he would enroll at the École nationale supérieure des beaux-arts and attend a class in painting taught by Charles Guerain and in fresco taught by Dicaut de l' Ail. He simultaneously studied mosaic under Professor Mani at the Ecole d' Arts et Professions.

Two years following his move to Paris in 1939, with the outbreak and inception of the Second World War, Moralis abandoned his studies in Paris and in September, he returned to Athens and exhibited a series of engravings with the Free Artists Group in Piraeus. The coming year in 1940 he is called up for military service but participates in the last pre-war Panhellenic Exhibition at the Zappeion, displaying works such as "Nude", "Camela", "Portrait of Th. Ch." and :Studies of heads". A year later in 1941 he got engaged to Maria Roussen. Moreover, during the years of the occupation his art mainly took the form of portraiture to earn a living while continuing to work rigorously for his constant development and improvement as an artist. In 1945, four years later, he and Maria got divorced, and just two years following that, he married sculptor Aglaïa Lymberaki, with whom his first and last child Konstantinos was born. The same year he is elected Professor of the Preparatory class at the Athens School of Fine Arts and simultaneously devotes himself exclusively to his painting, establishing once and for all the direction that his work will take, at his house in Nea Kiphissia.

in 1948, in the Panhellenic Exhibition at the Zappeion he submitted the paintings “pregnant woman”, “the artist with the wife” and “two friends” attracting particular notice and attention. The coming year in 1949, the Armos group of artists is founded by Yiannis in conjunction with Panayiotis Tetsis, Yannis Tsarouchis, Nikos Nikolaou, Nikos Engonopoulos, Yiorgos Manoussakis, Yiorgos Mavrofridis, Lili Arlioti, Andreas Vourloumis, Nelli Andrikopoulou, Kaiti Antypa, Nikos Hadjikyriakos-Ghikas, Elli Voïla, Kosmas Xenakis, Nikos Georgiadis, Minos Argyrakis, Marilena Aravantinou, Evgenios Spatharis and sculptors Klearchos Loukopoulos, Aglaïa Lymberaki, Natalia Mela and Yiorgos Georgiou.Some of his paintings were displayed in the group’s exhibition at the Zappeion held between the 10th of December of the same year and the 25th of January of the following year in 1950. A year after that group retrospective in 1951 he worked on designing the costumes and sets for a ballet performance by the name of “Six Popular Paintings”, directed by Rallou Manou, whose music was composed by Manos Hatzidakis. The ballet was ultimately performed at the Greek Ballet Company, and that enterprise was the beginning of a collaboration that was to last 15 years.

A year following the commence of that undertaking, in 1952, he takes part in the Panhellenic Exhibition at the Zappeion [displaying his paintings “Nude”, “Composition” and “Figure”] and in the Armos group Exhibition held from December of the same year up until January of the following year in 1953, when, with an invitation from the Soviet Government, Yiannis visits Russia along with other representatives of cultural and political circles in Greece and other European countries. In 1954 he began his collaboration with the Karolos Koun Arts Theatre designing state sets and costumes for the production "Naked Masks", consisting of four one-act plays by Pirandello. Additionally, in the same year, he exhibited along with other Greek artists in Canada and in Belgrade. In 1955 he and his wife Aglaïa divorced and two years later in 1957 he was elected professor of the painting workshop at the Athens School of Fine Arts and simultaneously commenced his collaboration with the National Theatre of Greece designing sets and costumes for "The Hands Of the Living God", a play by Pantelis Prevelakis, directed by Alexis Solomos.

Later, in 1958, along with artist Yannis Tsarouchis and sculptor Antonis Sochos he participated in a Venice Biennale retrospective exhibiting 24 works, some of which being oil paintings, some drawings, theatrical costume designs and lithographs impressing both critics and the public as his name is forwarded for an international price. The same year, his composition “interior” is purchased by the Torino Municipal Museum and added to its collection. In 1959 he held his first solo exhibition at the Armos Gallery in Athens exhibiting works that he had recently displayed in Venice along with a few other paintings. These exhibits demonstrated a type of maturity from the artist and marked the beginning of a new period. Some time later throughout the year, it is suggested to Yiannis by architects P. Vassiliadis, E. Vourekas and S. Staikos that he study the exterior north-west and south-east walls of the Hilton Hotel in Athens and submit decorative design which ended up being approved, with the commence of their execution at the same year. He later collaborated with Greek and foreign architects such as Sir Basil Spence and Antony Blee designing and decorating a multitude of public buildings and private houses. Moreover he took part in the exhibition “Stage Design in Greece” which was organized by the French Institute Students Association and designed the frontispiece for Odysseas Elytis’ poem “Axion Esti” published by the Ikaros Press, with whom he collaborated at the time.

Yiannis spent the next two years (from 1960 to 1961) producing various compositions for the Greek National Tourist Organization (GNTO) which was to be incorporated into the architectural designs for a hotel in Florina, in the Mont Parnes Hotel and in the Okeanis restaurant at Vouliagmeni. Additionally he designed compositions that were to be executed in coloured cement tiles for the Piraeus Port Authority’s pavilions on Akti Karaïskaki.

== Works ==
Some of Moralis' most famous works include:

- Two Friends (1946)
- Pregnant Woman (1948)
- Seated Nude (1952)
- Funeral Composition (1958)
- Erotiko (1990)

From the 1970s, he moved from the realistic depictions of the human form of his earlier works towards a geometric stylisation incorporating curves.

Over the years, Moralis was also involved with creating theatrical set and costume designs for the Greek National Theatre and the Greek National Ballet; illustrating poetic works by Odysseas Elytis and Giorgos Seferis; and decorating architectural works such as the façade of the Athens Hilton, the Metro-Station "Panepistimiou" and the Athens Central Station.

In 1965 he was decorated by King Constantine II with the Order of the Phoenix.

== Art market ==
On the 13th of November 2019, Moralis' "Full Moon M" sold for 418,584 € on a Bonhams auction in London.
