= Konstantinos Parthenis =

Greek painter (1878–1967)

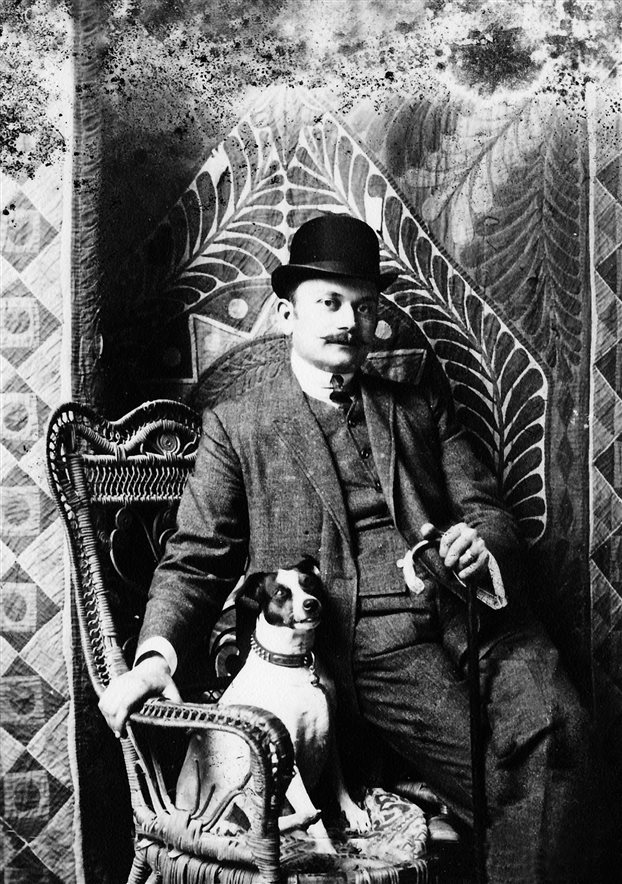
Portrait of Kostas Parthenis.

Konstantinos Parthenis (Greek: Κωνσταντίνος Παρθένης; 10 May 1878 – 25 July 1967) was a Greek painter. Born in Alexandria, part of the Greek community in Egypt, Parthenis broke with the Greek academic tradition of the 19th century and introduced modern elements together with traditional themes, like the figure of Christ, in his art.

== Life ==
Konstantinos Parthenis was born to an Italian mother and a Greek father in Alexandria. After a brief period of study in Italy, he studied from 1895 to 1903 at the Academy of Fine Arts Vienna under Karl Wilhelm Diefenbach. Parthenis belonged to the artistic group "Humanitas" that was founded in 1897 by Diefenbach on the "Himmelhof" in Ober Sankt Veit, and became the nucleus of the early alternative movement or life reform. Parthenis also took music lessons at the same time at the Vienna Conservatory. His first solo exhibition was in Boehm Künstlerhaus in 1899. After his studies in Vienna, he moved to Paris in 1903, and then he lived in Greece, where he worked as an icon painter. In 1907, he painted out the George's Church in Vienna. he was active as an icon painter of deep religiosity but also characterized by a fraction to traditional icon painting. After his participation in the Venice Biennale in 1938, the Italian government acquired one of his works.
