= List of Greek painters =

A list of Greek painters:

== A-E ==
- Agatharchus
- Bularchus
- Ioannis Altamouras
- Constantine Andreou
- Antiphilus
- Apelles
- Apollodorus
- Aristides of Thebes
- Christodoulos Aronis
- Michael Astrapas and Eutychios
- Tasos Chonias
- Cimon of Cleonae
- Alexandros Christofis
- Giorgio de Chirico
- Hermon di Giovanno
- Tasos Dimos
- Dionysius of Fourna
- Echion
- Nikos Engonopoulos
- Euphranor
- Eupompus
- Costas Evangelatos

== F-N ==
- Demetrios Farmakopoulos
- Alekos Fassianos
- Demetrios Galanis
- Angelos Giallinas
- El Greco
- Nikolaos Gyzis
- Nikos Hadjikyriakos-Ghikas
- Theophilos Hatzimihail
- Nikolaos Himonas
- Georgios Jakobides
- Nikolaos Kantounis
- Christos Kapralos
- Julianos Kattinis
- Photios Kontoglou
- Kourouniotis
- Nikolaos Koutouzis
- Andreas Kriezis
- Marios Loizides
- Nikiphoros Lytras
- Nikolaos Lytras
- Tassos Mantzavinos
- Melanthius
- Yiannis Moralis
- Theocharis Mores
- Dimitris Mytaras
- Nicos Nicolaides
- Nikos Nikolaou

== O-S ==
- Ioannis Oikonomou
- Charalambos Pachis
- Panaenus
- Périclès Pantazis
- George Papassavas
- Mina Papatheodorou-Valyraki
- Stass Paraskos
- Parrhasius
- Konstantinos Parthenis
- George Pastakas
- Pausias
- Gerasimos Pitzamanos
- Polyeidos
- Polygnotus
- Yiannis Poulakas
- Georgios Prokopiou
- Protogenes
- Yiannis Psychopedis
- Iakovos Rizos
- Kostas Spiropoulos
- Yiannis Spyropoulos
- Diamantis Stagidis
- Yannis Stavrou

== T-Z ==
- Panayiotis Tetsis
- Theon of Samos
- Theophanes the Greek
- Epameinondas Thomopoulos
- Timarete
- Yannis Tsarouchis
- Periklis Tsirigotis
- Dionysios Tsokos
- Antonio Vassilacchi
- Spyros Vassiliou
- Lydia Venieri
- Konstantinos Volanakis
- Constantin Xenakis
- Nikolaos Xydias Typaldos
- Odysseus Yakoumakis
- Zeuxis

== See also ==
- Greek art
- List of Greek artists
- Lists of painters
