= Diamandis =

Diamandis or Diamantis (Greek: Διαμαντής) is a Greek name. Notable people with this name include:

== Last name ==
- Apostolos Diamantis (born 2000), Greek association football player
- Artemas Diamandis (born 1999), English singer-songwriter
- Dimitris Diamantis (born 1979), Greek association football player
- Eleftherios Diamandis (born 1952), Cypriot biochemist
- Georgios Diamantis, Greek Olympic sport shooter
- Georgios Diamantis (footballer) (born 1979), Greek association football player
- Marina Diamandis (born 1985), Greek-Welsh singer
- Peter Diamandis (born 1961), Greek American engineer

== First name ==
- Diamantis Chouchoumis (born 1994), Greek association football player
- Diamantis Nikolaou (1790–1856), Greek Macedonian revolutionary
- Diamantis Panagiotopoulos (born 1967), Greek archaeologist
- Diamantis Slaftsakis (born 1994), Greek basketball player
- Diamantis Stagidis (born 1959), Greek painter

== See also ==
- Diamanti (Diamandi)
