= Tassos Mantzavinos =

Greek painter (born 1958)

Tassos Mantzavinos (Greek: Τάσος Μαντζαβίνος; born March 2, 1958) is a Greek painter who graduated from the Athens School of Fine Arts. His work has been exhibited in many museums and galleries in Greece and abroad and he has also worked on various book illustrations.

== Life ==
Tassos Mantzavinos was born in Athens on 2 March 1958. His first painting instructors were Manos Sofianos and Mimis Kontos. He studied painting at the Athens School of Fine Arts in 1979 and graduated with distinction in 1984. Among his teachers was Yiannis Moralis. In 1984 he held his first solo exhibition in Athens at Gallery 7. Tassos Mantzavinos continued with numerous solo exhibitions in Greece and participated in group exhibitions in Greece and abroad. He also participated in the 2nd and 3rd Biennale of Young Artists from Europe and the Mediterranean in Thessaloniki and Barcelona, as well as the 16th Biennale of Alexandria in 1987. Along with his artistic career, Tassos Mantzavinos taught drawing at the Vakalo Art & Design College in Athens and worked on various book illustrations.

== Work ==
Since his early period, the key elements of his painting were the anti-naturalistic, expressionistic intensity in the drawing style of his forms and an existential exploration through particular themes, but also through the act of painting itself. After the mid 1990s, the largest part of his work features narrative elements, referring to personal memories, experiences and dreams, clearly autobiographical, or strongly symbolic folk tales and traditions. Tassos Mantzavinos’ themes sometimes acquire a surrealistic dimension, as they are presented in unexpected combinations. The frequent presence of the artist's figure in the paintings, and his fascination with certain thematic motifs reveal a deep, empathetic link between the artist and his work. His three-dimensional wooden constructions, one of his latest artistic endeavours, function as an extension of his painting, enhancing its communicative immediacy.

== Solo exhibitions ==
- 2013 Tassos Mantzavinos-Kostas Papanikolaou, Citronne Gallery, Poros, Greece
- 2012 Tassos Mantzavinos, Theorema Art Gallery, Brussels, Belgium
- 2012 “For my strength is made perfect in weakness”, Benaki Museum, Greece
- 2012 Skoufa Gallery, Athens, Greece
- 2010 Chess, K-Art Gallery, Athens, Greece
- 2010 Zoumboulaki Gallery, Athens, Greece
- 2010 Angelo and Lito Katakouzenos Foundation, Athens, organised by the Hellenic Folklore Research Centre of the Academy of Athens, Athens, Greece
- 2008 Galerie Aliquando, Paris, France
- 2008 TinT Gallery, Thessaloniki, Greece
- 2008 Ionos Gallery, Karditsa, Greece
- 2005 Nees Morfes Gallery, Athens, Greece
- 2004 TinT Gallery, Thessaloniki, Greece
- 2003 Ariadne Gallery, Heracleion, Crete, Greece
- 2003 V. Mylonogiannis Gallery, Chania, Crete, Greece
- 2003 Nees Morfes Gallery, Athens, Greece
- 2002 TinT Gallery, Thessaloniki, Greece
- 2000 Nees Morfes Gallery, Athens, Greece
- 1999 Terracotta Gallery, Thessaloniki, Greece
- 1997 Nees Morfes Gallery, Athens, Greece
- 1996 Terracotta Gallery, Thessaloniki, Greece
- 1996 Anemos Gallery, Athens, Greece
- 1994 Terracotta Gallery, Thessaloniki, Greece
- 1994 Nees Morfes Gallery, Athens, Greece
- 1993 Gallery 24, Athens, Greece
- 1991 Medusa Art Gallery, Athens, Greece
- 1989 Medusa Art Gallery, Athens, Greece
- 1987 Medusa Art Gallery, Athens, Greece
- 1985 Gallery 7, Athens, Greece
- 1984 Gallery 7, Athens, Greece

== Group exhibitions ==
- 2013 The 80s Generation - Contemporary Greek Painting from the Sotiris Felios Collection, National Gallery-Alexander Soutzos Museum, Sparta
- 2013 Somatographies—Contemporary Greek Painting from the Sotiris Felios Collection, National Gallery-Alexander Soutzos Museum, Nafplion
- 2013 Offerings, Art Space 24, Athens, Greece
- 2012 Ellenico Plurale- Dipinti dalla Collezione Sotiris Fellios, Complesso del Vittoriano, Rome, Italy
- 2012 Between Reality and Fantasy, Giorgio de Chirico Art Center, Volos, Greece
- 2010 Erysichthon: A contemporary reading of the myth, Cultural Centre Kanellopoulos, Elefsina, Greece
- 2010 Naked Truth, Frissiras Museum, Athens, Greece
- 2010 Offerings of Europe: Christian votive practices in the East and the West, Muzeum Kresów, Lubaczomie, Poland
- 2010 A world of votive offerings, organized by the Hellenic Folklore Research Centre of the Academy of Athens, Hellenic American Union, Athens, Greece
- 2010 Contemporary Greek Painting from the Sotiris Felios Collection, Sismanoglio Megaro, Istanbul, Turkey
- 2009 Human and Divine, French Embassy in Athens, a collaboration of the National Museum of European and Mediterranean Civilization of France and the Hellenic Folklore Research Centre of the Academy of Athens, Greece
- 2009 Nees Morfes, 50 years later, Benaki Museum, Athens, Greece
- 2009 The Perspective of Time. Pictorial Histories: Paintings from the Sotiris Felios Collection, Benaki Museum, Athens, Greece
- 2009 Oli-vie-r, organized by the Hellenic Folklore Research Centre of the Academy of Athens, National School of the Agriculture of Meknes, Morocco
- 2008 Rural Heritage and Collective Identity, Muzeum Kresów, Lubaczowie, Poland
- 2008 The Sea. Four Painters, Citronne Gallety, Poros, Greece
- 2008 Christmas with Papadiamantis, Art Space 24, Athens, Greece
- 2007 Tamata and Thavmata. Organized by the 21st Ephorate of Byzantine Antiquities and the National Museum for European and Mediterranean Culture of France, Corfu, Greece
- 2007 Self Portrait of an Other. Giullio Caimi(1897-1982), Art Space 24, Athens, Greece
- 2007 Birthplace. Apha Trust 20 years, Benaki Museum, Athens, Greece
- 2006 Humanography, works from the Christos Christofis Collection, Thracian Art and Tradition Foundation, Xanthi, Greece
- 2006 Summer, an Encounter, Art Space 24, Athens, Greece
- 2006 Disguises: Femininity, Manliness and Other Certainties, State Museum of Contemporary Art, Thessaloniki, Greece
- 2006 Once upon a Time there was Penelope Delta..., Athens College, Athens, Greece
- 2006 Projections of Shadows and Colour. Tassos Missouras, Tassos Mantzavinos, Michalis Μadenis, from the Christos Christofis Collection, French Institute, Athens, Greece
- 2004 In praise of the Olive Tree, Academy of Athens, Athens, Greece
- 2004 Art Athina 11, Athens, Greece (Nees Morfes Gallery)
- 2004 City of Games, Technopolis of the Municipality of Athens, Greece
- 2004 Frontiersmen of Europe, Byzantine Museum, Athens, Greece, in collaboration with the Academy of Athens
- 2002 Athens, Single Use Gazes, A. Antonopoulou Art, Athens, Greece
- 2002 Greek Painters. The Christos Christofis Collection, Triantifylli Residence, Athens, Greece
- 2002 A Visual Journey, Frissiras Museum, Athens, Greece
- 2002 Me, Myself, Rethymnon Centre of Contemporary Art, Rethymnon, Crete, Greece
- 2002 450+1. The Permanent Collection, Macedonian Museum of Contemporary Art, Thessaloniki, Greece
- 2002 Designing of the poster for the 44th Thessaloniki Festival “New Horizons”, Thessaloniki, Greece
- 2000 Oinousses 2000. Contemporary Greek Painting: The Christos Christofis Collection, Marine Highschool, Oinousses, Greece
- 2000 Art Athina 8, Athens, Greece (with Nees Morfes Gallery)
- 1999 Approaches to Greekness. The 80s and 90s Generations, Municipal Gallery, Athens, Greece and Greek Cultural Home, Stockholm, Dalarna Museum, Falun, Sweden, Château de Vianden, Luxemburg
- 1999 Forty, Nees Morfes Gallery, Athens, Greece
- 1998 Greek Landscape Painting in the 19th-20th Centuries, National Gallery & Alexandros Soutzos Museum, Athens, Greece
- 1998 Art Athina 6, Athens, Greece (Terracotta Gallery)
- 1998 Original Replica, Nees Morfes Gallery, Athens, Greece
- 1998 Designing of the poster and invitation for the IX European Signal Processing Conference, organised by the Athens University – Computer Technology Institute, Greece
- 1997 Physiognomy of an Industrial Landscape, BIS Factory, Athens, Greece
- 1997 Comments and References, Pierides Museum, Glyfada, Greece
- 1997 42ème Salon de Montrouge, Paris, France
- 1996 Riparte 3, Rome, Italy
- 1996 Group Show, Selini Gallery, Kifissia, Greece
- 1994 Art Athina 2, Athens, Greece (Terracotta Gallery)
- 1994 The Loss of Form in Space, Nees Morfes Gallery, Athens, Greece
- 1991 Contemporary Greek Painting. Vlassis Frissiras Collection, Pierides Museum, Glyfada, Athens, Greece
- 1989 17+1, Medusa Art Gallery, Athens, Greece
- 1988 Encounters – Pinpointing – Juxtapositions, Athens Municipal Gallery, Greece
- 1987 3rd European Mediterranean Biennale for Young Artists, Barcelona, Spain
- 1987 16th Biennale of Alexandria, Egypt
- 1986 2nd European Mediterranean Biennale for Young Artists, Thessaloniki, Greece

== Bibliography ==
- Begleris, F. Tassos Mantzavinos: For my strength is made perfect in weakness. Athens: Patakis Publications, 2012. Print. ISBN 978-960-16-4533-9
