= Diamanti =

Diamanti, also spelled Diamandi or Diamandy, is a name used by several cultures in Italy and the Balkans. Notable people with the name include:

== Given name ==
- Diamandi Djuvara (died 1821), Ottoman Wallachian mercenary

== Surname ==
- Alcibiades Diamandi (1893–1948), Greek Aromanian politician
- Alessandro Diamanti (born 1983), Italian association football player
- Brendon Diamanti (born 1981), New Zealand cricketer
- Eleni Diamanti, Greek engineer and researcher
- George Diamandy (1867–1917), Romanian politician, dramatist and social scientist
- Gersi Diamanti (born 1999), Albanian association football player
- Ilvo Diamanti (born 1952), Italian political scientist
- Litsa Diamanti (born 1949), Greek singer
- Rodrigo Diamanti, Venezuelan human rights activist
- Sterie Diamandi (1897–1981), Romanian Aromanian biographer and essayist

== See also ==
- Diamanti (film)
- Diamandis (Diamantis)
- Diamante (disambiguation)
