= Anna-Maria Tsakali =

Anna-Maria Tsakali (Greek: Άννα-Μαρία Τσακάλη; 1959) is a Greek painter.

== Biography ==
She was born in 1959 in Piraeus. From 1983 to 1987 Tsakali studied at the Beaux-Arts de Paris under Leonardo Cremonini. In her early years she focused on everyday objects such as clothes, furniture and utensils as well as cityscapes. Later she turned to landscape painting with an emphasis on nature, and since then the main motif of her depictions has been flowers and plants.

In 2013 she held a retrospective exhibition of her works at the Musée Lambinet in Versailles. The artist's works are exhibited at the National Gallery of Greece, the Frissiras Museum, the Kouvoutsakis Gallery, the Teloglion Foundation of Arts, the National Bank of Greece Collection, the French Ministry of Finance and private collections. She has also illustrated books. Tsakali is married to Edouardos Sakayan, who is also a painter.

== Bibliography ==
- Κομίνη-Διαλέτη, Δώρα· Ματθιόπουλος, Ευγένιος Δ (2000). Λεξικό Ελλήνων Καλλιτεχνών:Ζωγράφοι, γλύπτες, χαράκτες, 16ος-20ός αιώνας. Καλλιτεχνική βιβλιοθήκη. 4. Athens: MELISSA Publishing House. ISBN 978-960-204-226-7.
