= Tasos Chonias =

Greek painter

- Τάσος Χώνιας
- Born: 1974 (age 51–52); Athens, Greece
- Occupation: Painter
- Awards: Saatchi Gallery Competition Award Winner; 2011
- Website: https://www.facebook.com/chonias/

Signature
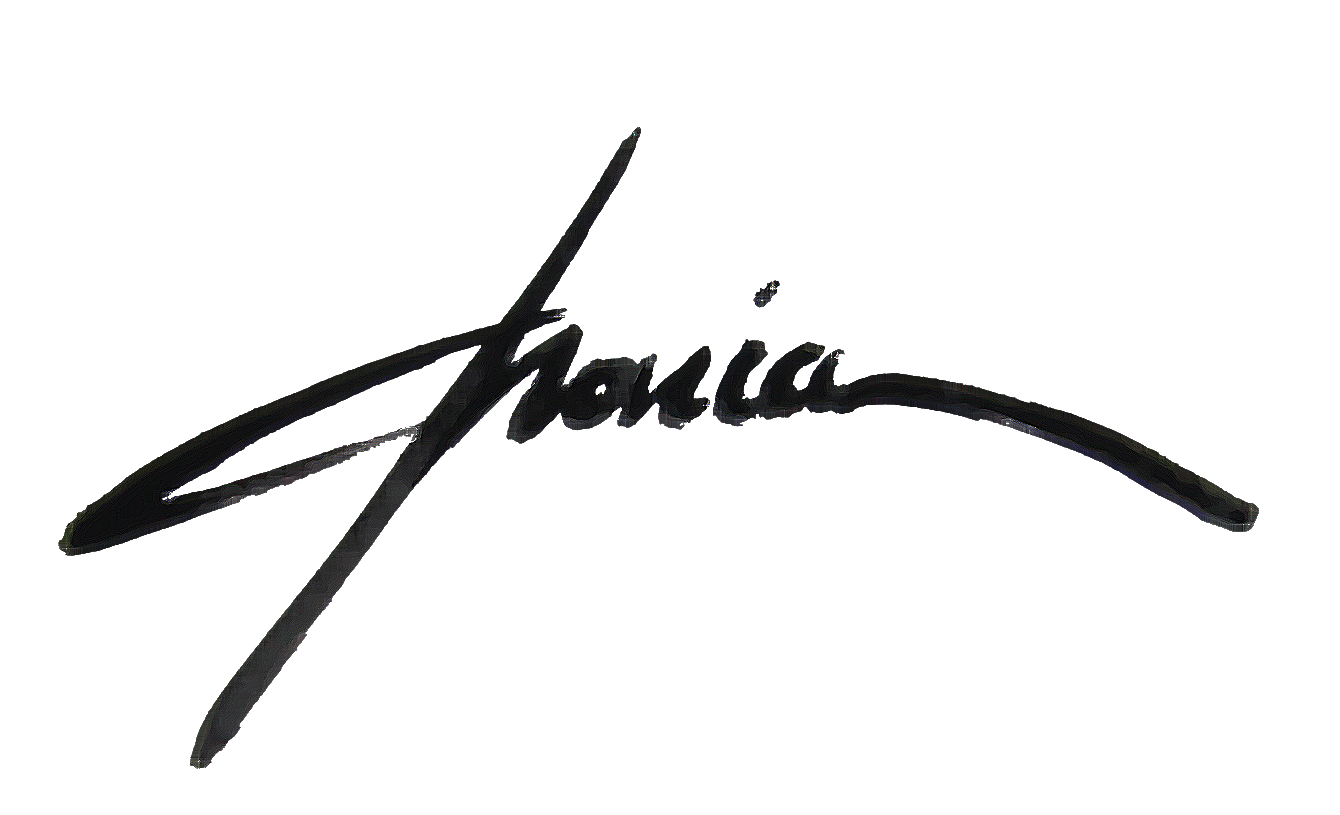

Tasos Chonias (born 1974) is a Greek painter whose artwork today resides in many major private collections, institutions and galleries around the world.

== Biography ==
Chonias started painting at a young age; at the age of 16 he did wall paintings at commercial and non-commercial spaces and later turned to scenography, movie-poster design and conservation of old wall paintings. Since 2005, he has been focusing exclusively on oil paintings with themes evolving from a series of interiors to landscapes and his most recent series of cars painted against urban backgrounds.

His Interiors work is inspired by the lives of people who lived inside neoclassical buildings like the one that hosts his atelier in Kipseli. Because of his particular depiction of sunlight entering the spaces, his collection of Interiors paintings has been described by art critics as presenting "the illusion of space that belongs to a different, third dimension".

He made his first solo exhibition at the gallery Agathi in 2006 and has taken part in many group exhibitions in Greece and abroad.

Today, his paintings are being auctioned at large auction houses across Europe such as the Bonhams of London.

He is collaborating with renowned galleries across Europe. A non-exhaustive list of galleries includes:

- Paris – Modus Art Gallery, Galerie de Medicis
- London – Saatchi Gallery
- Cyprus

The price range of this paintings in past auctions has been from $5,000 to $25,000.

== Honors, awards and distinctions ==
Chonias has received significant awards and prizes over the years.

In 2011, he received the second place award among 5,777 contestants in a competition organized by the Saatchi Gallery of London.

He had participated two more times before his 2011 award in Saatchi Gallery competitions where he held the 10th and 8th position respectively.

== Paintings ==
His paintings are oil on canvas with typical dimensions of 140 x 160 cm (55 x 63 inches) or 130 x 150 cm (51 x 59 inches).

A number of online websites and art blogs have featured his work in the past.
