= Diamante =

Diamante or diamanté may refer to:

== Jewellery ==
- Rhinestone, a diamond simulant
- Sequin, a small shiny disk-shaped ornament

== Places ==
=== Argentina ===
- Diamante, Entre Ríos, a municipio in Diamante Department
- Diamante Caldera, a volcanic caldera partly in the Province of Mendoza
- Diamante River, a river in the Province of Mendoza
- Laguna del Diamante, a lake in the Province of Mendoza

=== Elsewhere ===
- Diamante, Paraíba, Brazil, a municipality
- Diamante Caldera, Chile, a volcanic caldera partly in Santiago Metropolitan Region
- Diamante, Calabria, Italy, a comune in the province of Cosenza

== People ==
- Diamante (musician) (born 1996), American singer and songwriter
- David Diamante (born 1971), American ring announcer
- Fra Diamante (1430–1498), Italian fresco painter
- Juan Bautista Diamante (1625–1687), Spanish dramatist
- Diamante Medaglia Faini (1724–1770), Italian poet and composer
- Diamante (wrestler, born 1992), also known as Luís Mante, Mexican luchador
- Diamante (wrestler, born 1991), Cuban American professional wrestler
- Diamante Azul (born 1982), Mexican luchador enmascarado
- Diamante Merybrown, Spanish drag queen

== Music ==
- Diamante Music Group, a California-based independent record label distributor
- Diamante, a 1988 album by Sasha Sökol, or the title song
- Diamanté, 2017, by At the Drive-In
- "Diamante" (Zucchero Fornaciari song), 1989
- "Diamante" (Morissette song), 2016

== Other uses ==
- Diamante citron, a type of fruit from Italy
- Mitsubishi Diamante, a car built from 1990 to 2004
- Diamante, a character in the Japanese manga series One Piece
- Diamante, an unrhymed, seven-line poem arrayed like a rhombus (diamond)

== See also ==
- Diamond (disambiguation)
- Diamanti, a name
- Diamanti (film)
