= Spiros Pizanis =

Greek painter (1870–1927)

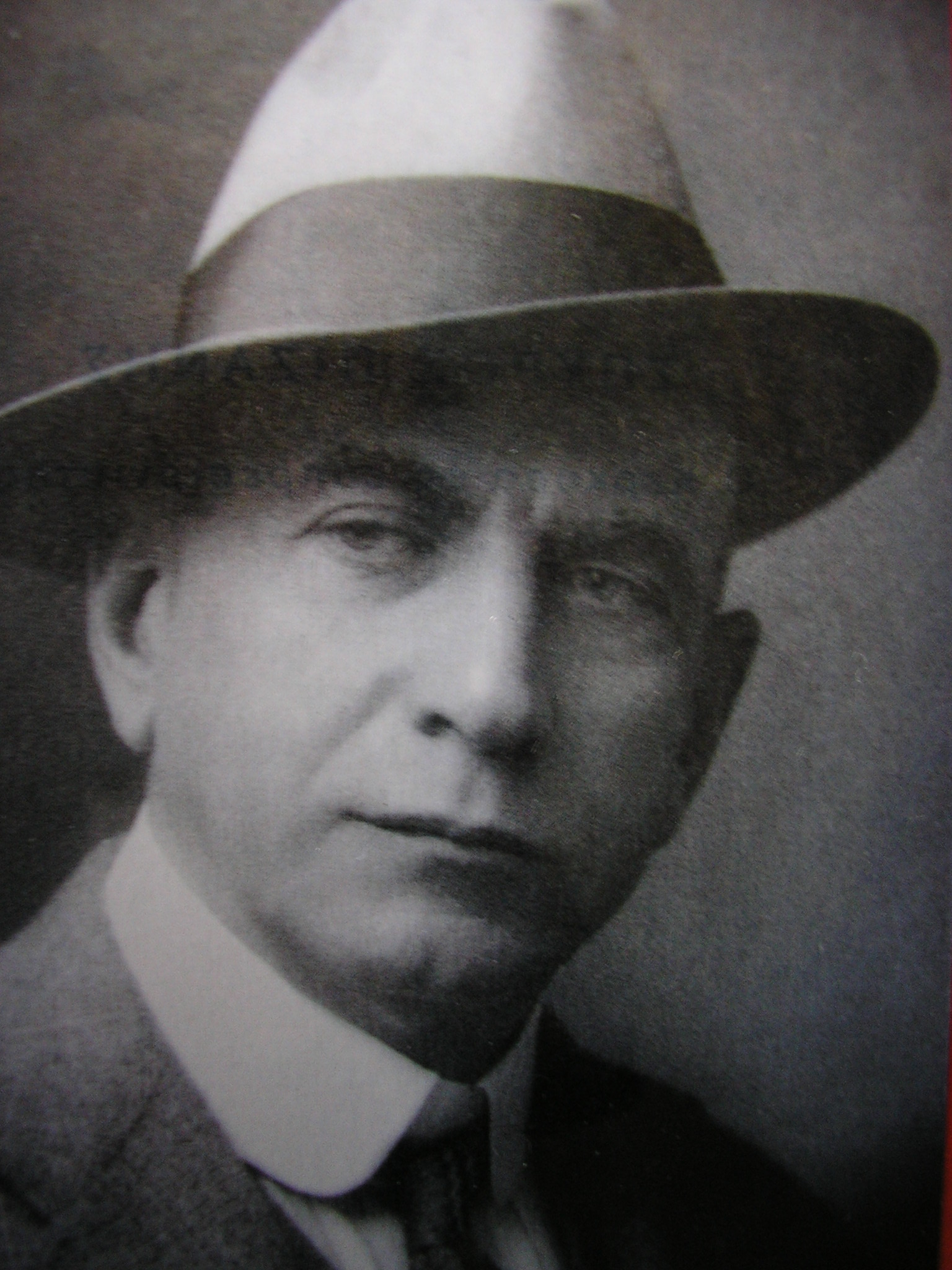
Spiros Pizanis (date unknown)

Spiros Pizanis (Greek: Σπύρος Πιζάνης; (1870, Corfu - 1927, Rome) was a Greek painter; one of their first Impressionists.

== Βiography ==
His father, Stefanos, originally from Venice, was a decorative artist, known for his wall paintings at the Achilleion, and restorative work at the Nobile Teatro di San Giacomo di Corfù. He studied in Rome and at the Athens School of Fine Arts, with Charalambos Pachis. From around 1900, he taught night classes, sponsored by the Italian Ministry of Education. Epameinondas Thomopoulos was one of his best known students. From 1905 to 1907, he operated a private school.

In 1907, he moved to Smyrna, where he taught drawing and painting at the newly founded "Scuola D'Ivrea Centrale"; operated by an order of Italian Catholic nuns. Eventually, he became a manager there. He was forced to leave during the Turkish War of Independence; taking his family to Rome, where he once again became an art teacher. He remained there until his death in 1927.

His works are notable for their coloristic effects. Many of his watercolors, on Venetian subjects, are on display at the Municipal Art Gallery of Corfu. His larger works have been scattered. Most are in Rome, although many are in Smyrna, Ankara, and Genoa.

He was married to Melpomene Pachis, a daughter of his former teacher. Their son, Vittorio, was also a well known artist, who spent most of his career in Italy and provided drawings for La Tribuna Illustrata, a weekly newspaper supplement.

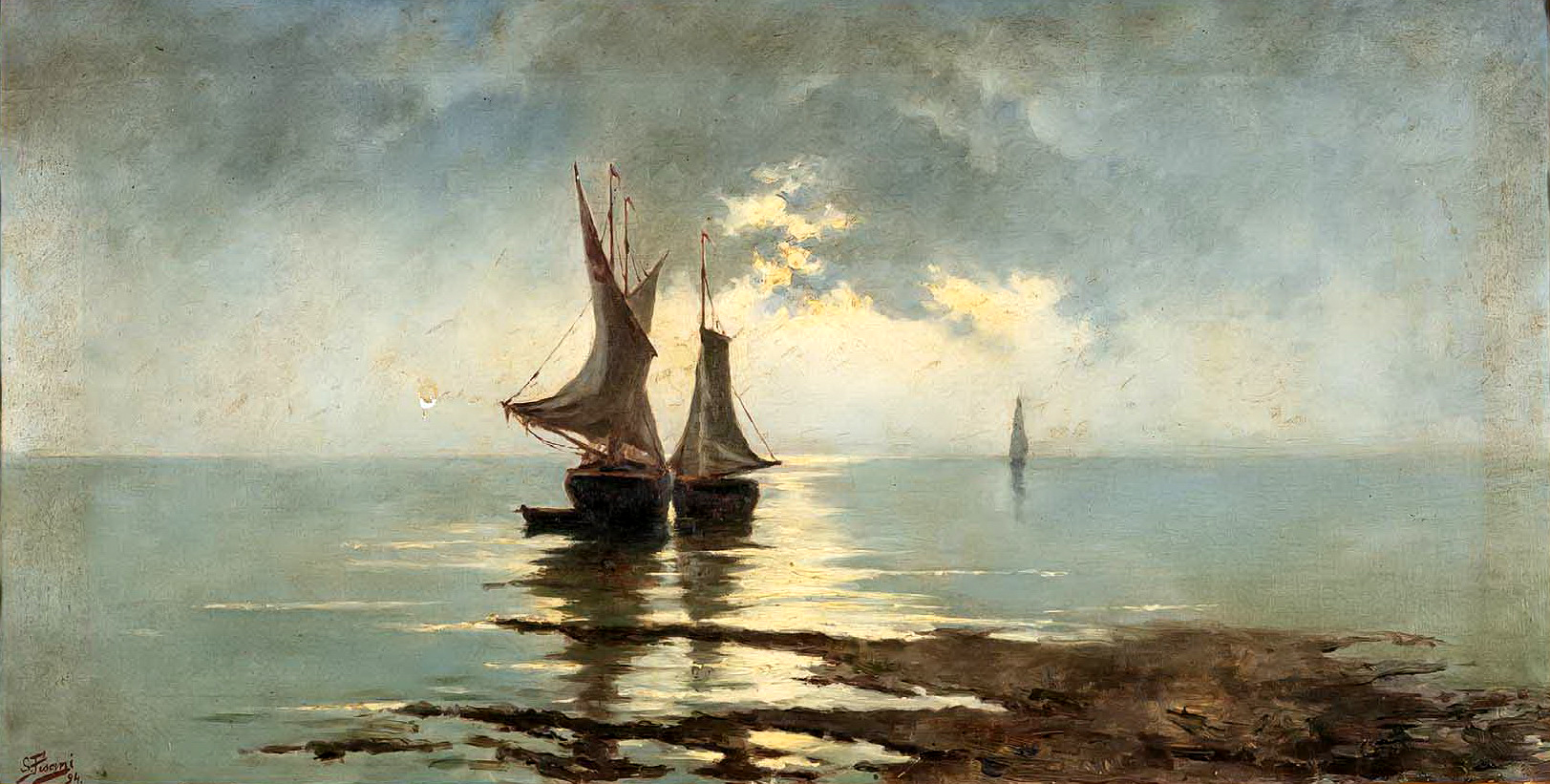
Fishing Boats
