= Georgios Samartzis =

Greek painter and musician

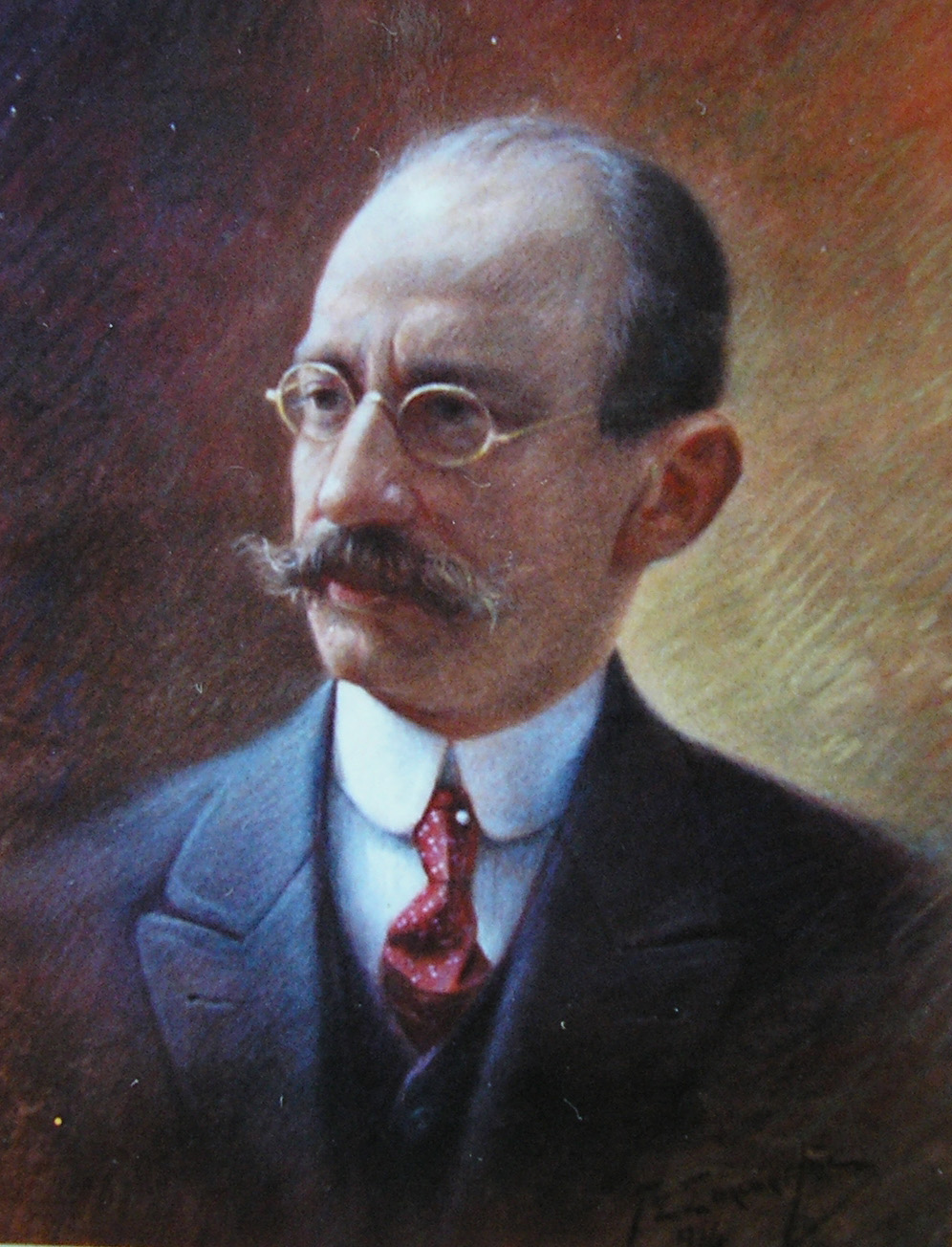
Self-portrait (date unknown)

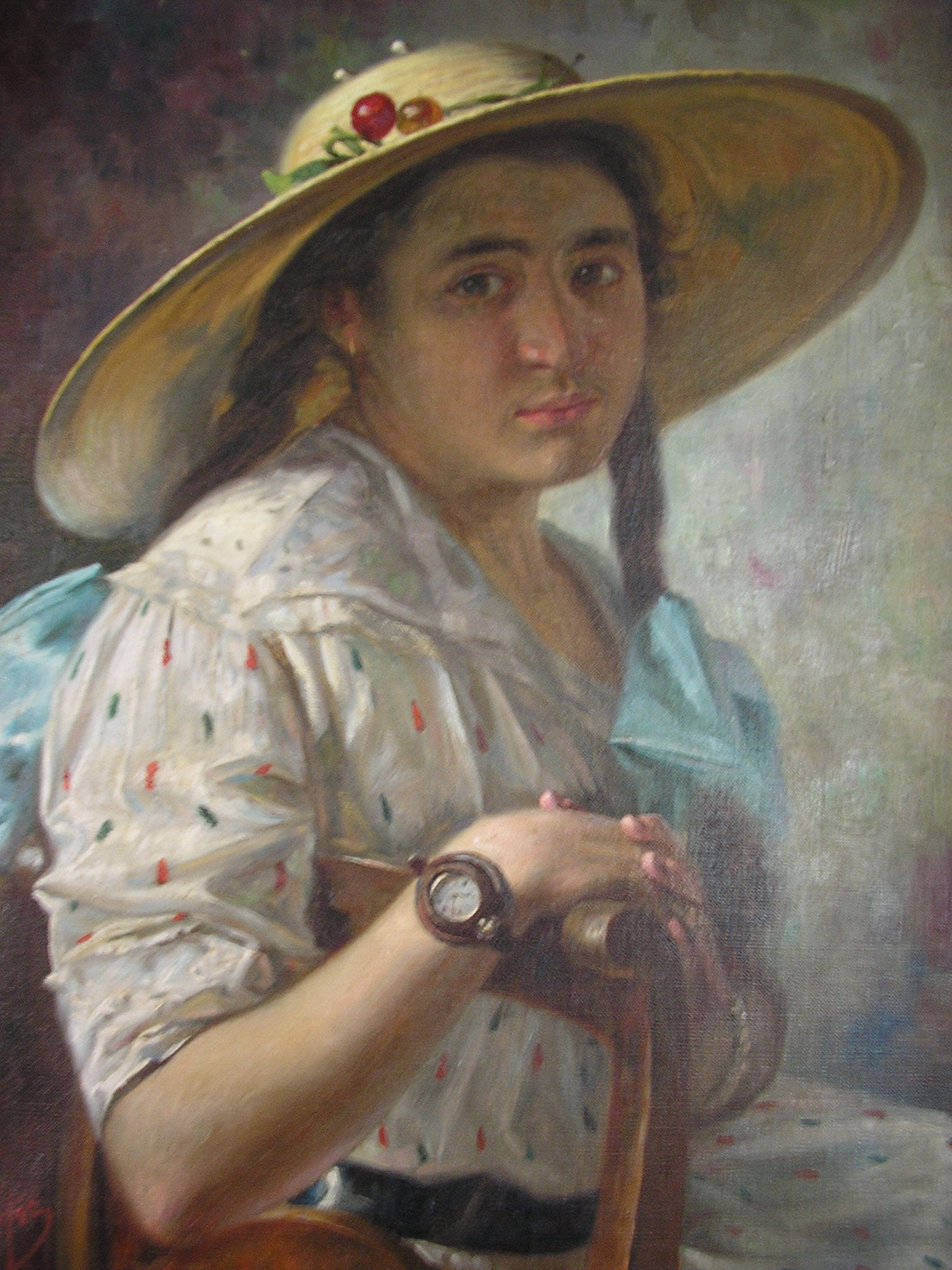
Portrait of his daughter, Iris

Georgios Samartzis (Greek: Γεώργιος Σαμαρτζής; 8 February 1868, Corfu - 19 March 1925, Athens) was a Greek painter and musician; associated with the Heptanese school.

== Biography ==
His grandfather was the noted historian and memoirist, Panagiotis Samartzis (1797-1871). He took his first painting lessons at a private school operated by Charalambos Pachis. He would later marry one of Pachis' daughters.

In 1888, thanks to a scholarship from the Petrides Endowment, he was able to study at the Accademia di Belle Arti di Napoli, with Professors Domenico Morelli and Vincenzo Marinelli. After returning to Greece, he taught at the Technical High School then, in 1902, took over management of the new Corfu Art School, founded by Angelos Giallinas. In addition to painting, he also dabbled in poetry and was an accomplished musician.

He dealt with a variety of themes, including portraits, landscapes, ethnographic scenes, and religious art; including a large "Last Supper". His works are generally classified as Academic Realism.

During World War I he moved to Athens, where he died. His works may be seen at the National Gallery and the University of Athens. The Municipal Art Gallery of Corfu has a special display room devoted to his paintings and those he collected. His compositions are still played by local bands, and some of his poems were set to music by Iosif Kaisaris. A street has been named after him.
