= Adoration of the Magi (El Greco, Athens) =

Painting by El Greco

The Adoration of the Magi
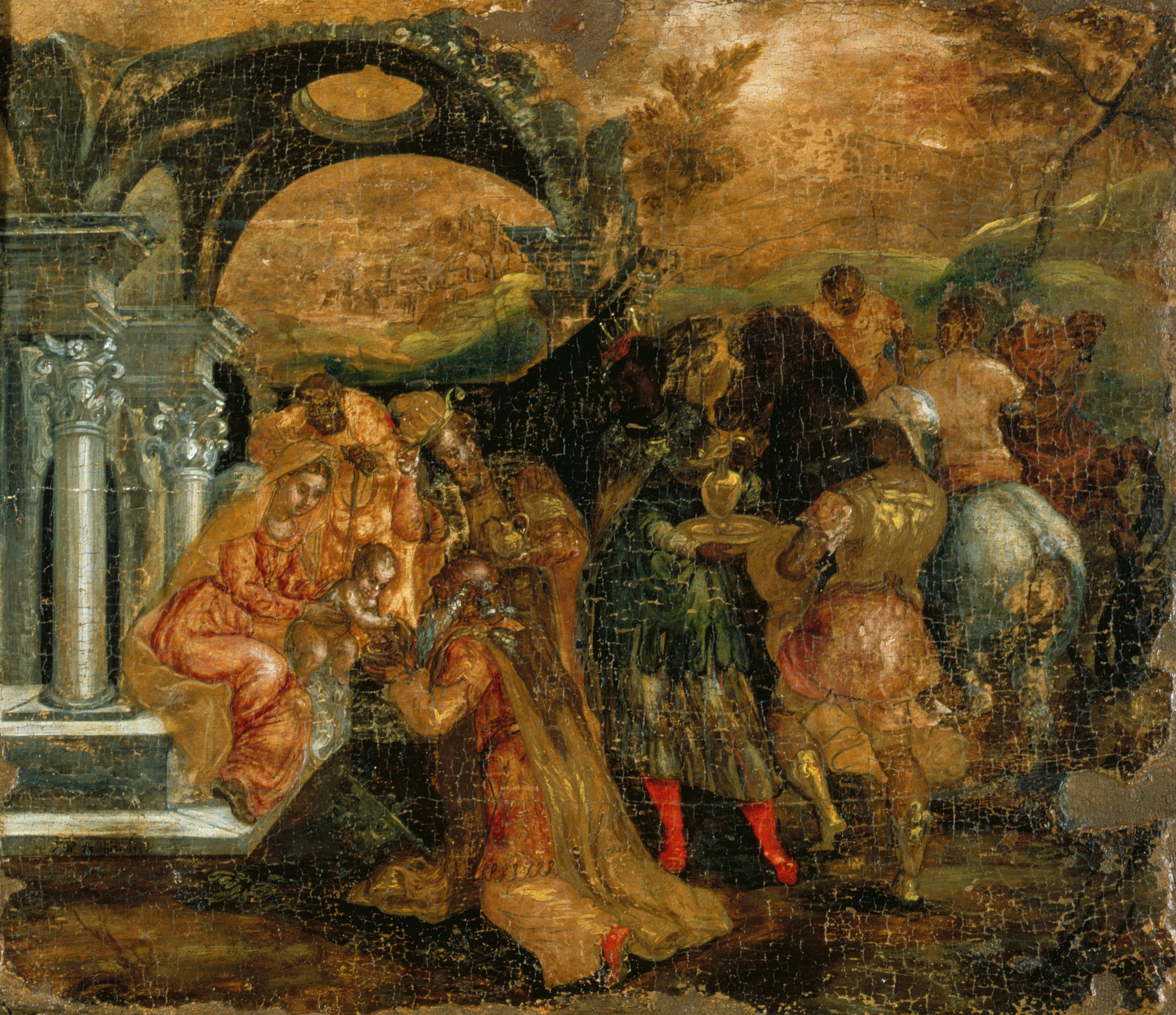
- Artist: El Greco
- Year: 1565–1567
- Medium: Tempera on wood
- Movement: Cretan School
- Dimensions: 40 cm × 45 cm (16 in × 18 in)
- Location: Benaki Museum, Athens

The Adoration of the Magi is an oil painting executed c. 1565–1567 by El Greco. It and his Saint Luke Painting the Madonna and Child are his most Western works, with the Adoration showing the particularly strong influence of Parmigianino at this time in his career. It may have been painted in Venice or elsewhere during his stay in Italy or for an Italian client living in the painter's native Crete, but this is debated. It is now in the Benaki Museum in Athens.

== See also ==
- List of works by El Greco

== Bibliography ==
- Álvarez Lopera, José, El Greco, Madrid, Arlanza, 2005, Biblioteca «Descubrir el Arte», (colección «Grandes maestros»). ISBN 84-9550-344-1.
- Scholz-Hänsel, Michael, El Greco, Colonia, Taschen, 2003. ISBN 978-3-8228-3173-1.
- https://web.archive.org/web/20101129110531/http://www.artehistoria.jcyl.es/genios/cuadros/6292.htm
