= Angelos Delivorrias =

Greek archeologist (1937–2018)

- Άγγελος Δεληβορριάς

Director of Benaki Museum
- In office 1973–2015

Personal details
- Born: 16 August 1937 Athens, Greece
- Died: 24 April 2018 (aged 80) Athens, Greece
- Education: Aristotle University of Thessaloniki; University of Freiburg; École pratique des hautes études
- Occupation: Art historian and academic

Angelos Delivorrias (Greek: Άγγελος Δεληβορριάς; 16 August 1937 – 24 April 2018) was a Greek archeologist who was the director of Benaki Museum for 41 years and a member of the Academy of Athens.

== Career ==
Graduate in the Faculty of Philosophy of the University of Thessaloniki, Angelos Delivorrias graduated from the University of Freiburg in Germany in 1956. In 1965 he was appointed to the Greek Archaeological Service and served at the National Archaeological Museum. In 1973, he graduated from the University of Sorbonne at the École pratique des hautes études. A year later he was assigned the direction of the Benaki Museum in Athens, where he recommended immediately a radical regeneration that was completed after 27 years. In 1992 he was professor of Art History at the Department of Theater Studies of the School of Philosophy of the University of Athens. In 2000, he was honored by the Academy of Athens with its Silver Medal, while the Benaki Museum was awarded the "Gold Medal". On 31 October 2014, at an event held in the main building of the Museum, he announced his departure from the post of director, now occupying a seat in the Administrative Committee of the Foundation. In June 2016 he was elected as full member of the Academy of Athens, in the archeology-museology department.

== Director of Benaki Museum ==
Delivorrias managed to attract the interest of many donors and he realized a narrative process of development, consisting in the prominence of Greek civilization from antiquity to contemporary art. According to himself, he was the longest-lasting internationally head of the Museum, but at the same time the manager, the fundraiser and the scientific officer, as well as the man who had undertaken all sorts of contacts with the administrative services of the Greek state.
