= Benaki Museum =

Museum in Athens, Greece

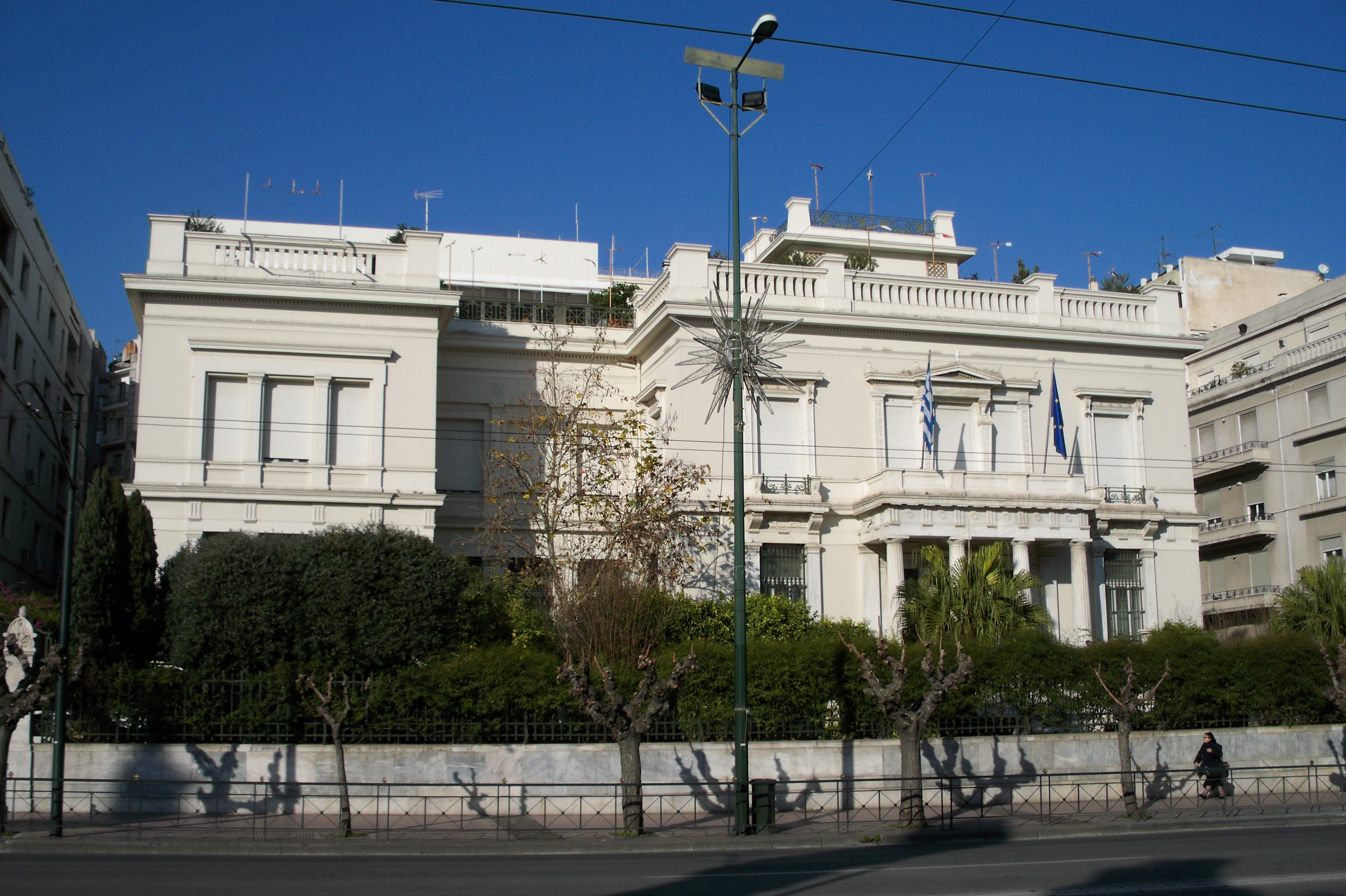
- Interactive fullscreen map
- Established: 1930
- Location: Athens, Greece
- Website: The Benaki Museum

The Benaki Museum, established and endowed in 1930 by Antonis Benakis in memory of his father Emmanuel Benakis, is housed in the Benakis family mansion in Athens, Greece. The museum houses Greek works of art from the prehistorical to the modern times, an extensive collection of Asian art, hosts periodic exhibitions and maintains a state-of-the-art restoration and conservation workshop. Although the museum initially housed a collection that included Islamic art, Chinese porcelain and exhibits on toys, its 2000 re-opening led to the creation of satellite museums that focused on specific collections, allowing the main museum to focus on Greek culture over the span of the country's history. This Museum in Athens houses over 100,000 artifacts from Greek history and showcases the many eras, civilizations and cultures which have influenced the development of Greece. Spread over a number of locations, the museum ranks among Greece’s foremost cultural institutions.

== Athens campus ==
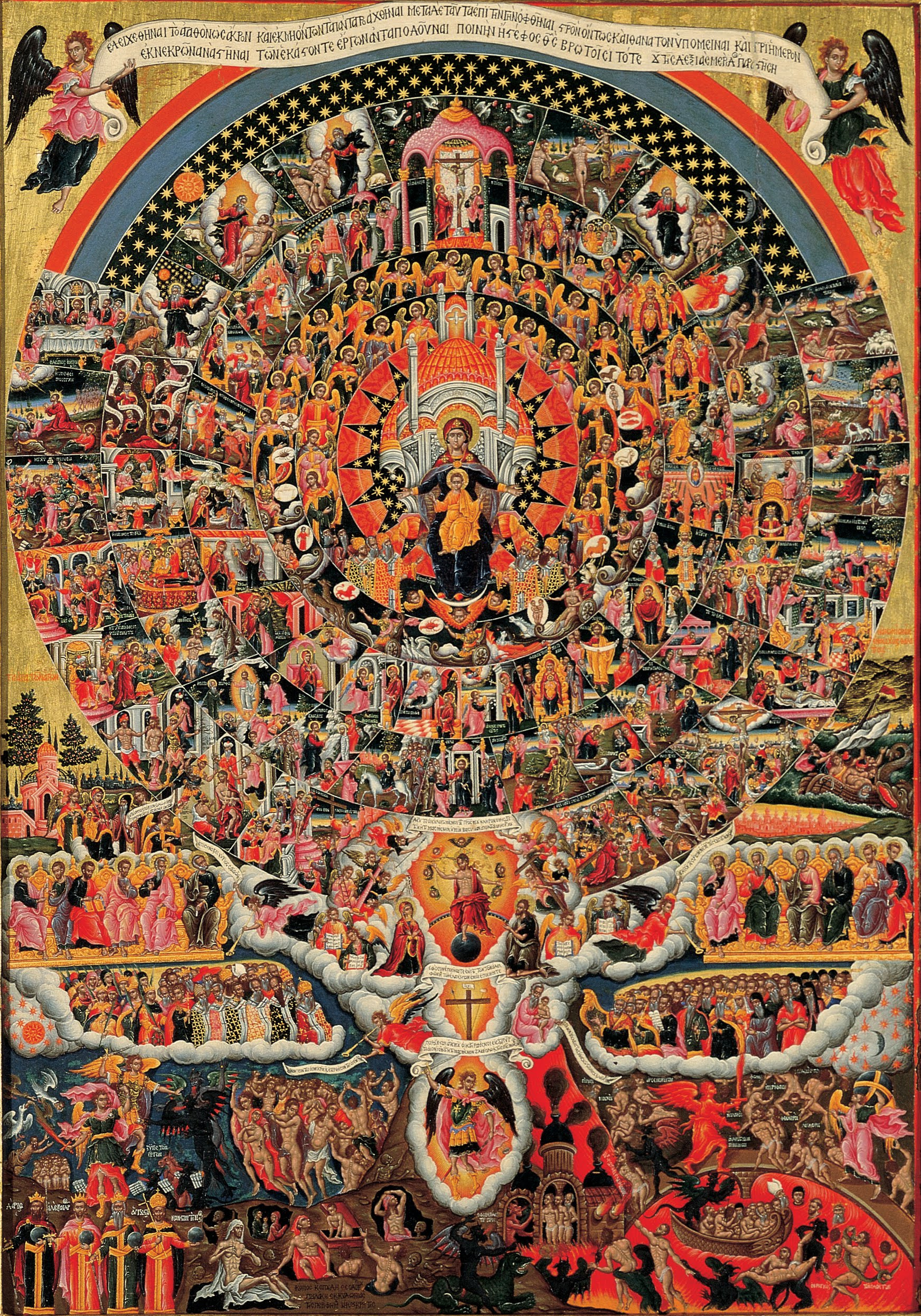
Theodoros Poulakis: Icon illustrating the Hymn to the Virgin, 17th century

The museum's primary home is in the Benakis' house opposite the National Garden on Queen Sofias Avenue and owes its existence to the generosity of Antonis Benakis, whose family lived in Alexandria, Egypt.

In 1931, the Benakis donated the family's house in Athens and their collection of more than 37,000 Islamic and Byzantine objects. More than 9,000 artifacts were added by the 1970s, which spurred donations from other sources. Benakis remained active in the museum until his death in 1954.

Under the directorship of Angelos Delivorrias, the museum added more than 60,000 objects, books and documents, some of which were purchased and others donated. Delivorrias opts to focus on displaying donated items in order to encourage public participation and strengthen the community's ties to the museum. The museum also focuses on the fact that Greek history does not begin and end with specific events but rather exists along a continuum that continues today.

Parts of the museum's collections have travelled worldwide, including Canada in 2008, the United States in 1959 in partnership with the Smithsonian Institution and in 2005, an Ancient Greek solid gold drinking cup left Greece for the first time and traveled to the Powerhouse Museum in Sydney and the Melbourne Immigration Museum in Melbourne, Australia.

=== 2000 re-opening ===
In 2000, the Benaki Museum reopened following a $20 million renovation and restoration of the building, which was damaged in an earthquake. The renovation allowed it to become the only museum in Greece that brings visitors through all ages of Greek culture and history. It is also unique in that it does not focus on nationalism but rather recognizes and celebrates the foreign influences on Greek culture.

Although the museum's director, Angelos Delivorrias, came up with the idea to refocus the museum and its exhibits in 1973, more than 25 years passed before he was able to make this a new reality. This reality involved moving the museum's collections of Islamic Art and Chinese porcelain with painting to other locations so that the main museum in Athens would focus solely on Greece.

== Satellite museums ==
Over the years the museum has been further endowed by various donors, and it now includes the seaside Kouloura Mansion in Palaio Phaliro, which houses the Toy Museum, the Benaki Museum of Islamic Art in the Kerameikos district, the Nikos Hadjikyriakos-Ghikas Gallery in downtown Athens, the Benaki Museum Pireos street Annex (138 Pireos street) and the Penelope Delta House in Kifissia, which houses the Historical Archive Collection.

=== Benaki Museum of Islamic Art ===
As part of the museum's re-focusing on Greek culture, its Islamic collection was moved to a new home in 2004 in time for the Athens Olympics. The new museum also has new galleries for temporary traveling exhibits.

The Islamic art collections of the Benaki Museum are housed in a complex of neo-classical buildings located in the historical centre of Athens, in the Kerameikos district. Major archaeological sites located in the same area include the grounds of the ancient Agora (currently undergoing development), the Doric temple of Hephaestus (the "Theseio") and the Museum of the ancient Kerameikos necropolis (cemetery). This complex of buildings at the corner of Agion Asomaton and Dipylou streets, was donated to the Museum by the late Lambros Eftaxias, who in his later years served as Honorary President of the Museum Board of Trustees.

Inaugurated on 27 July 2004, the museum occupies more than 1,000 square meters of remodeled space showcasing: ceramics, pottery, metalwork, gold, woodcarvings, glasswork and textiles, bone carvings, inscribed funerary steles, arms and armor. The museum's collection is said to rank among the most important worldwide and includes masterpieces from India, Persia, Mesopotamia, the Middle East, Arabia, Egypt, North Africa, Sicily, Spain and Asia Minor. Covering Islamic art from the 7th through the 19th centuries, it has a rich collection of Ottoman art from the Empire's peak in the 16th century.

== Gallery ==
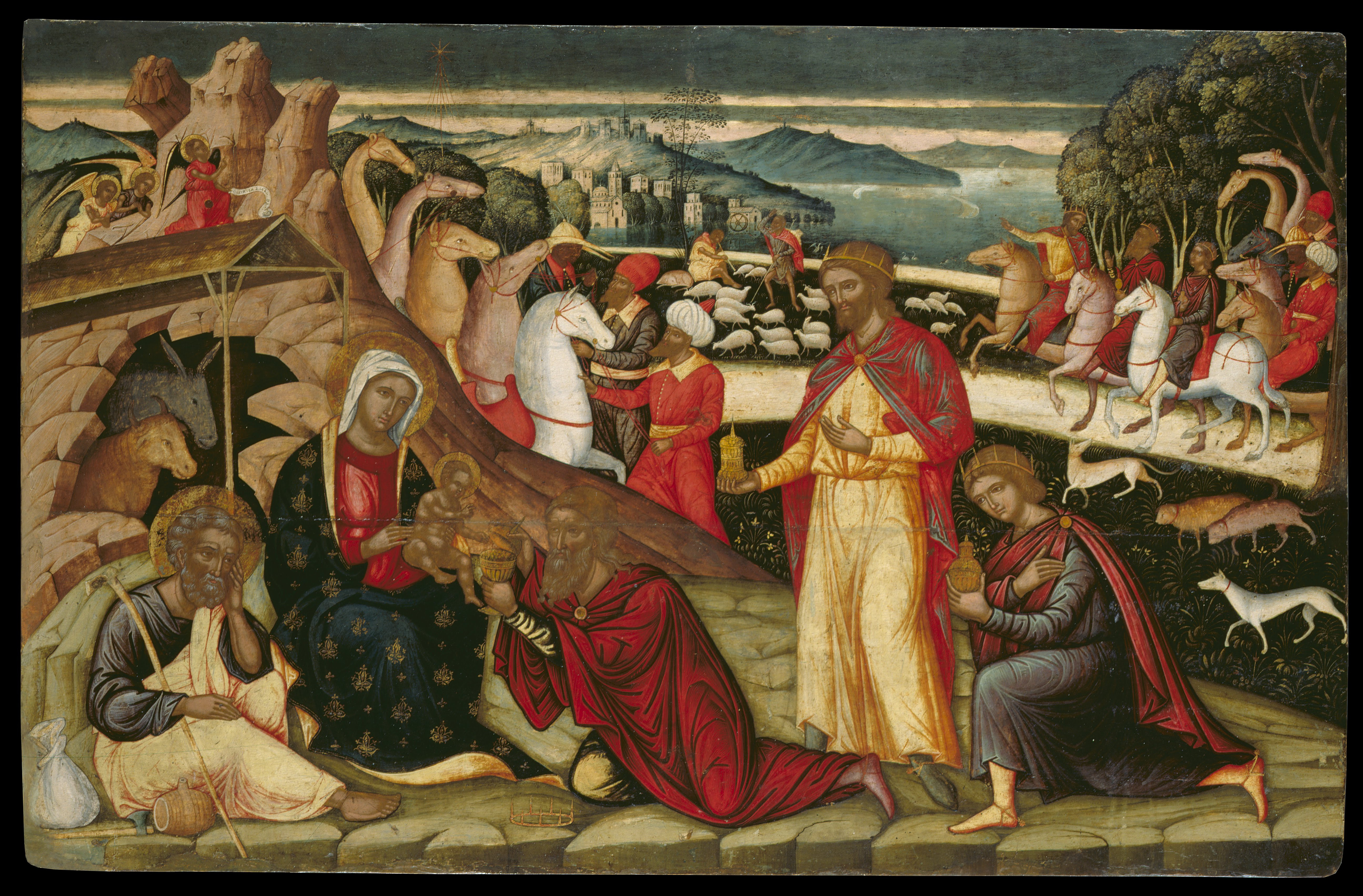
Adoration of the Magi by Ioannis Permeniates

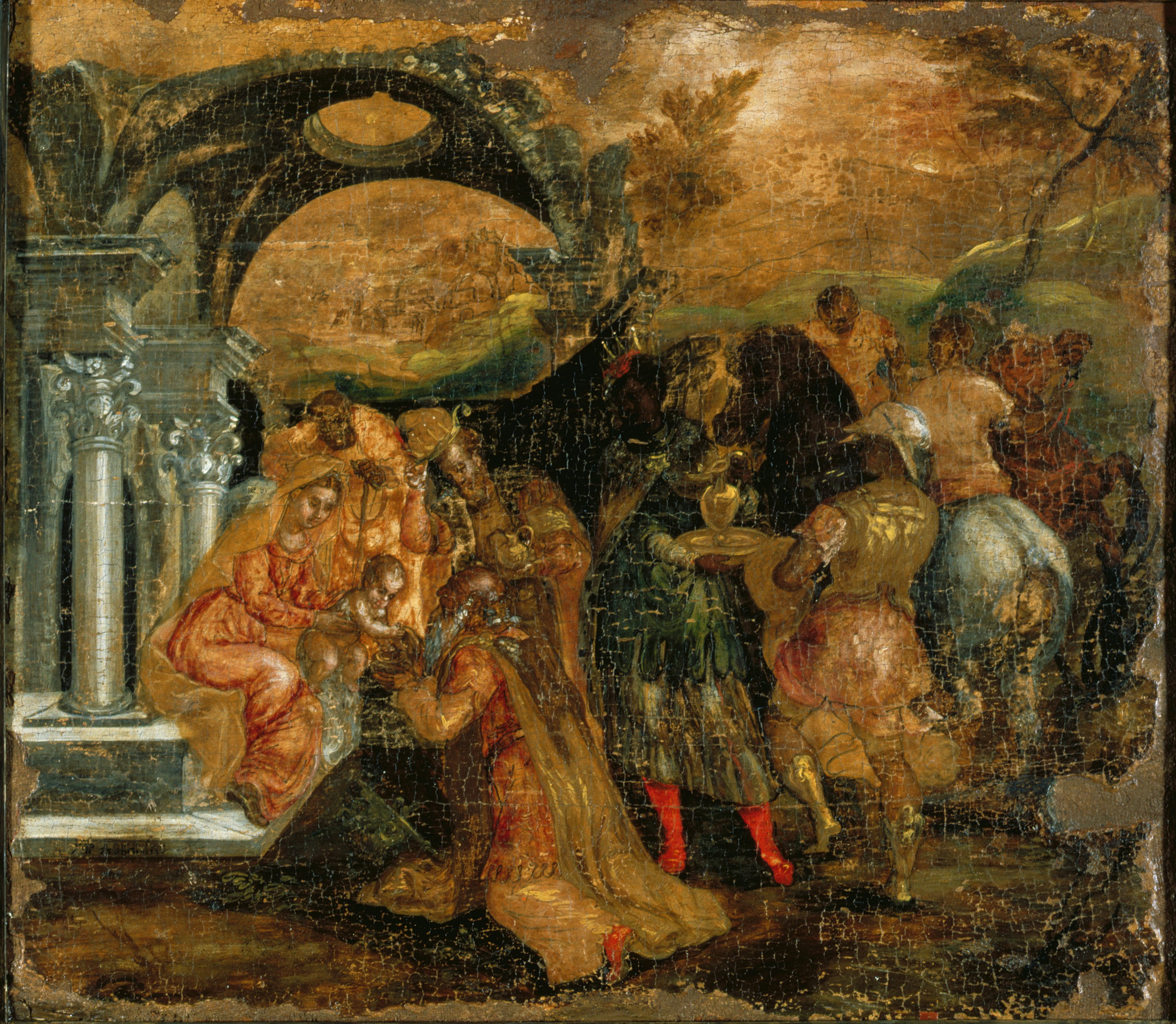
Adoration of the Magi by El Greco

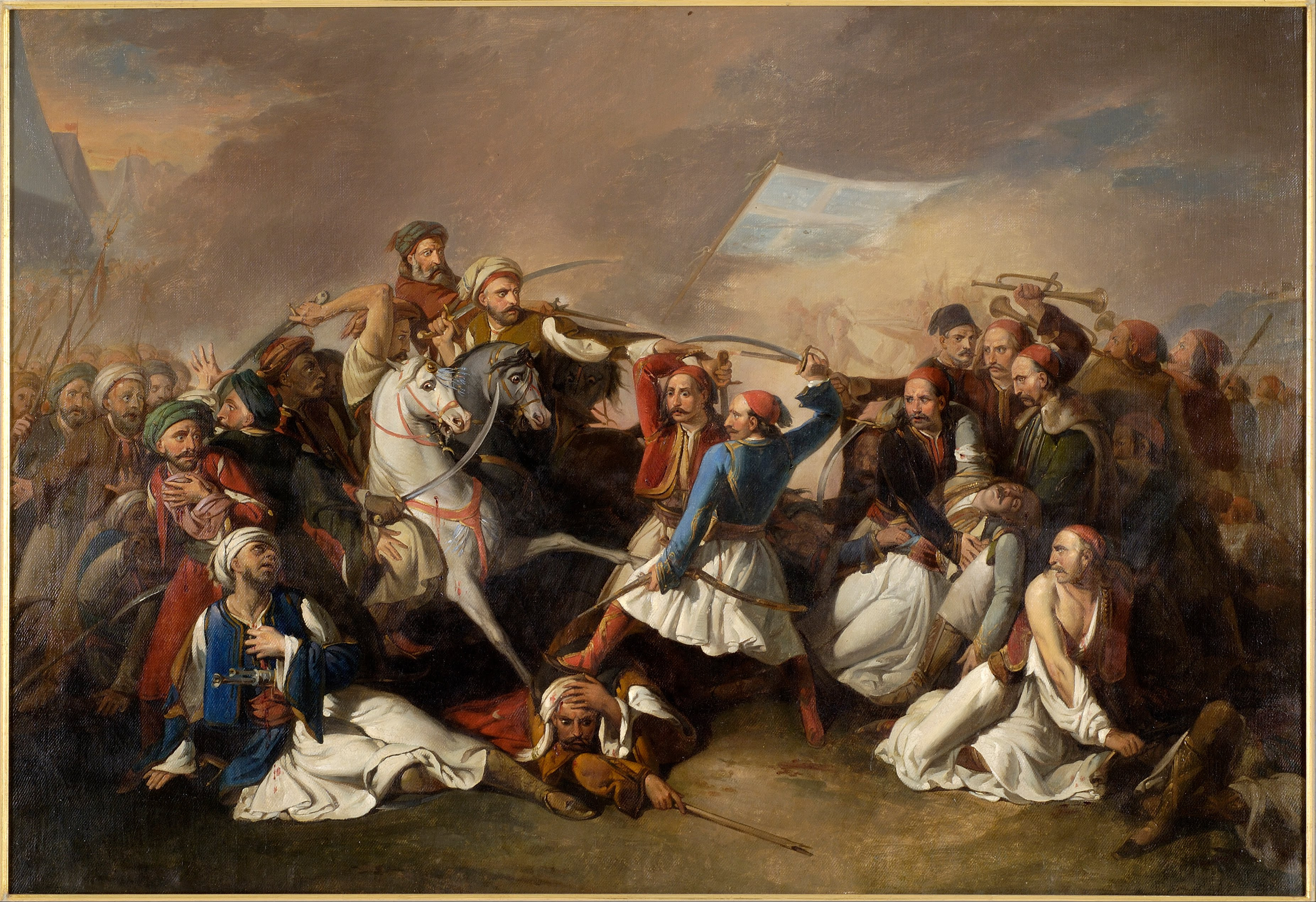
Death of Markos Botsaris by Filippo Marsigli

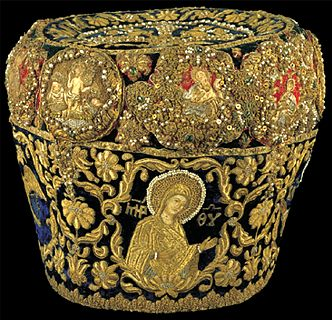
Mitre of 1715
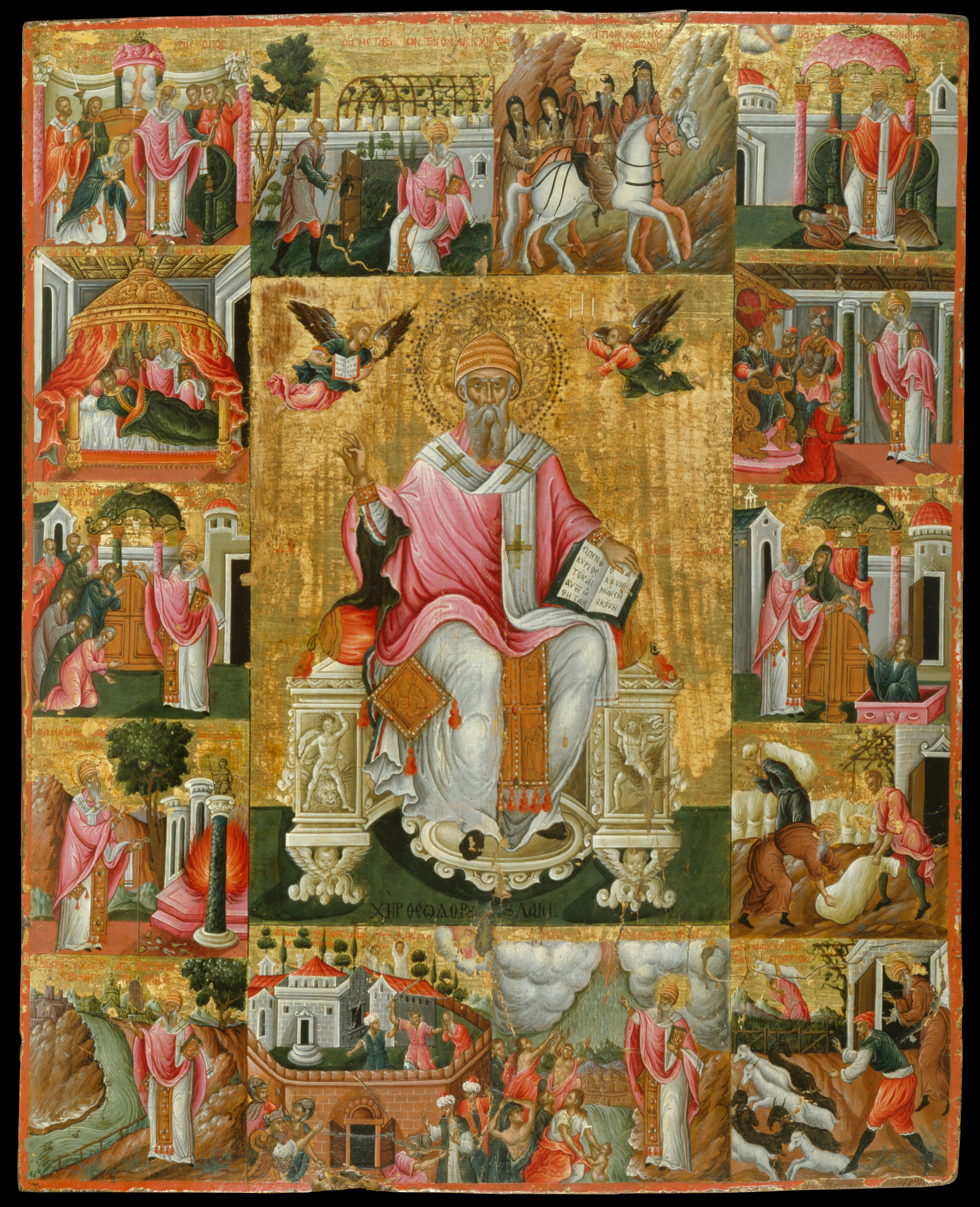
St Spyridon and scenes from his life by Theodoros Poulakis

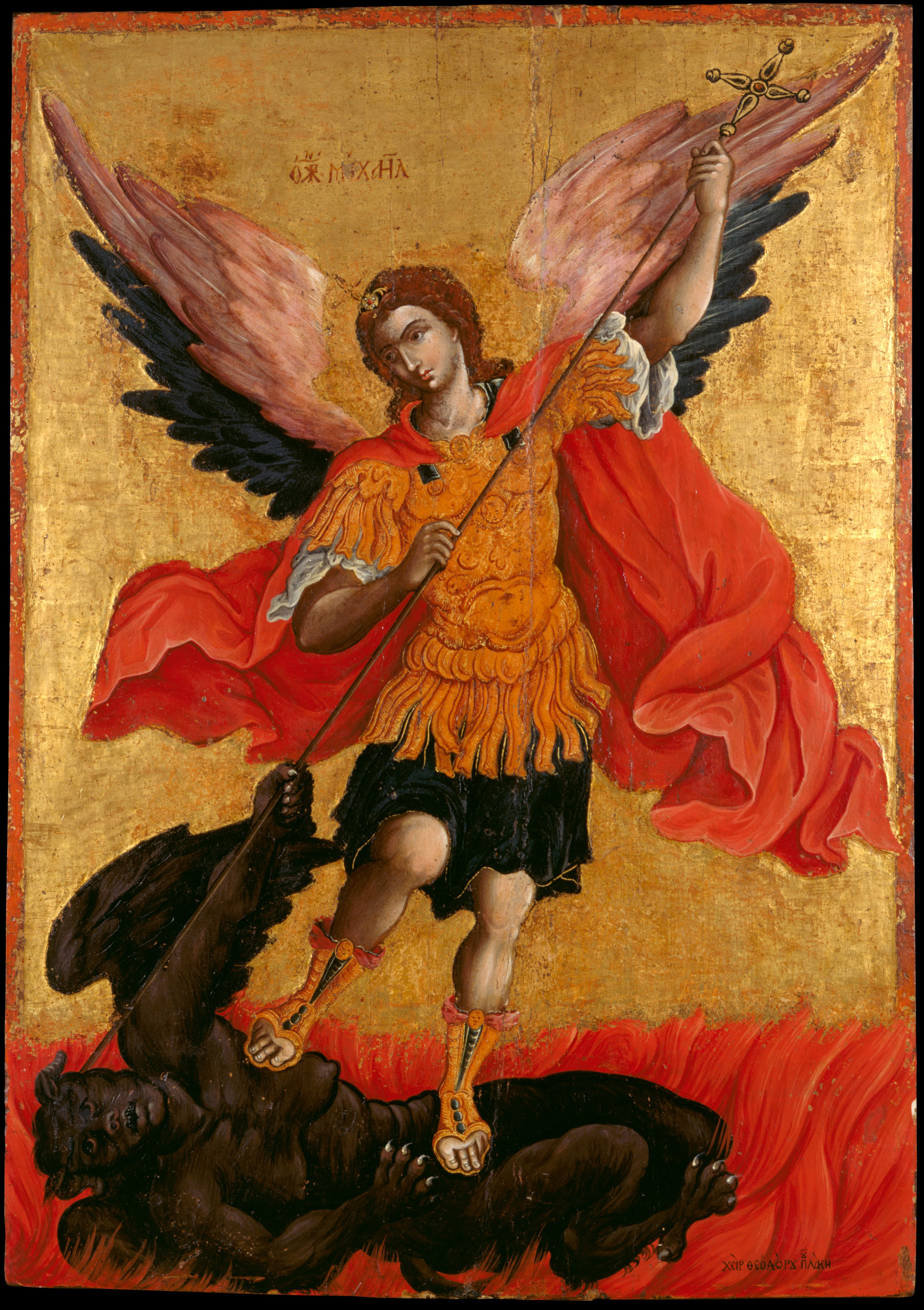
Archangel Michael by Theodoros Poulakis

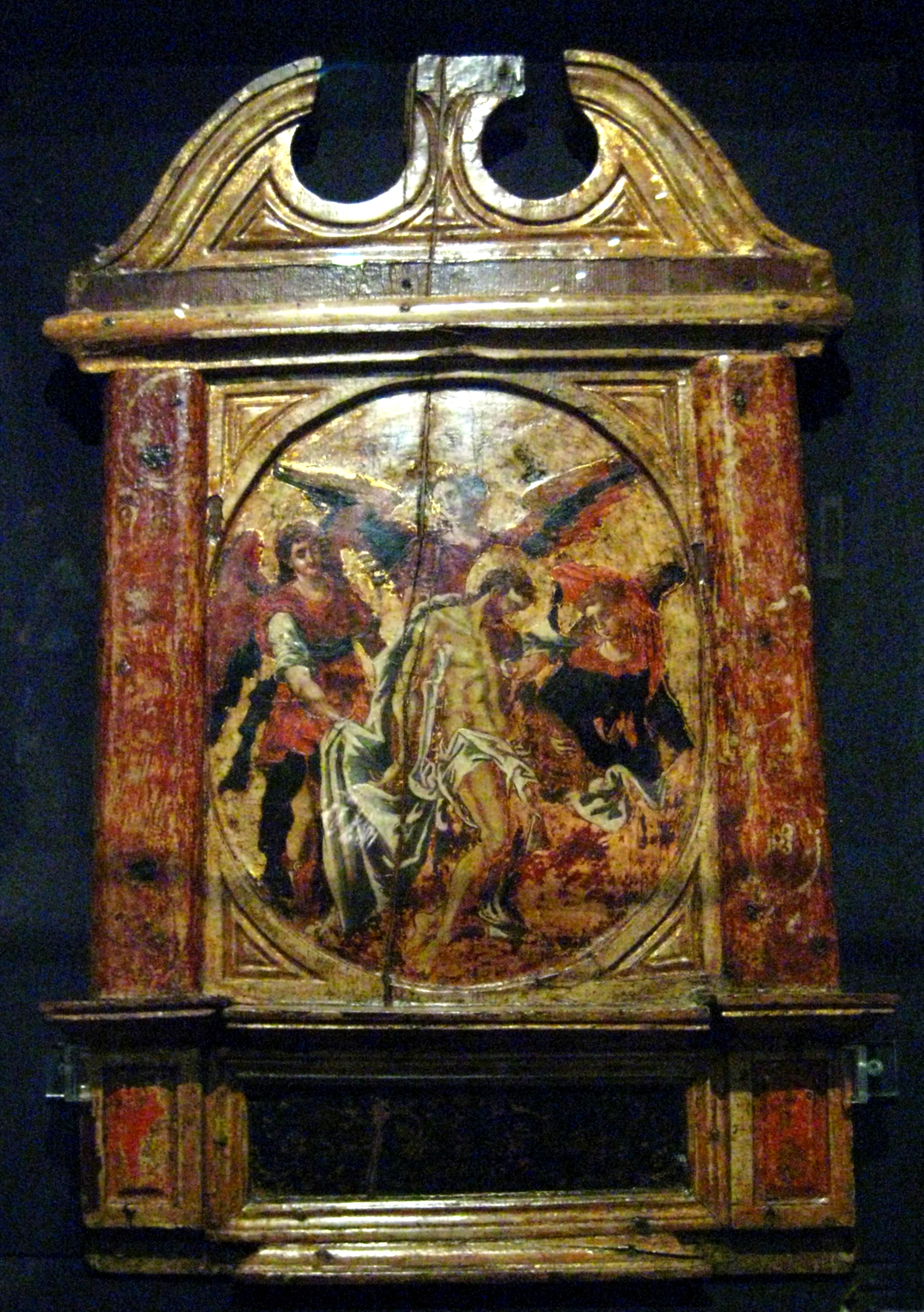
Pieta by El Greco, 1566

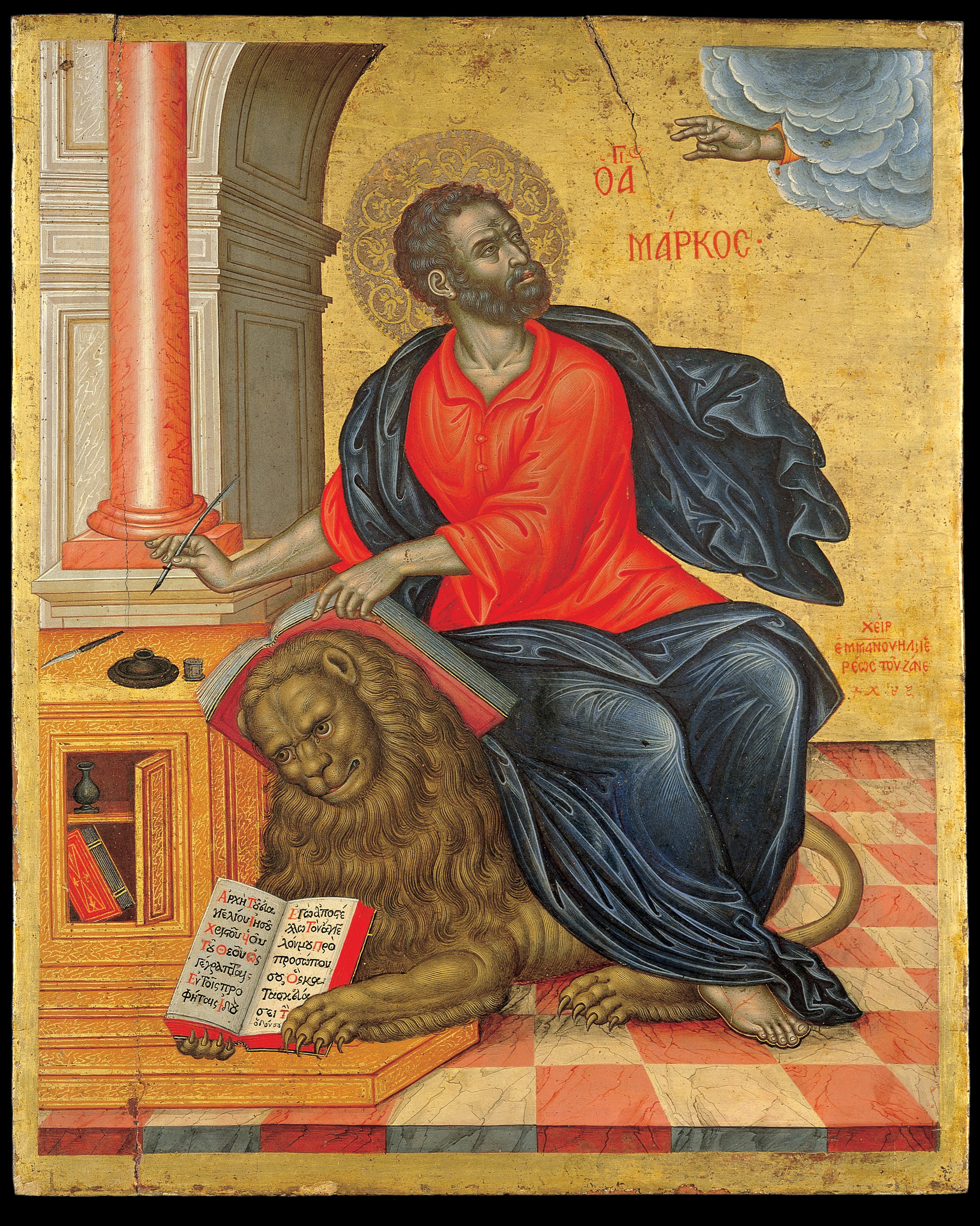
St.Mark the Evangelist by Emmanuel Tzanes, 1657

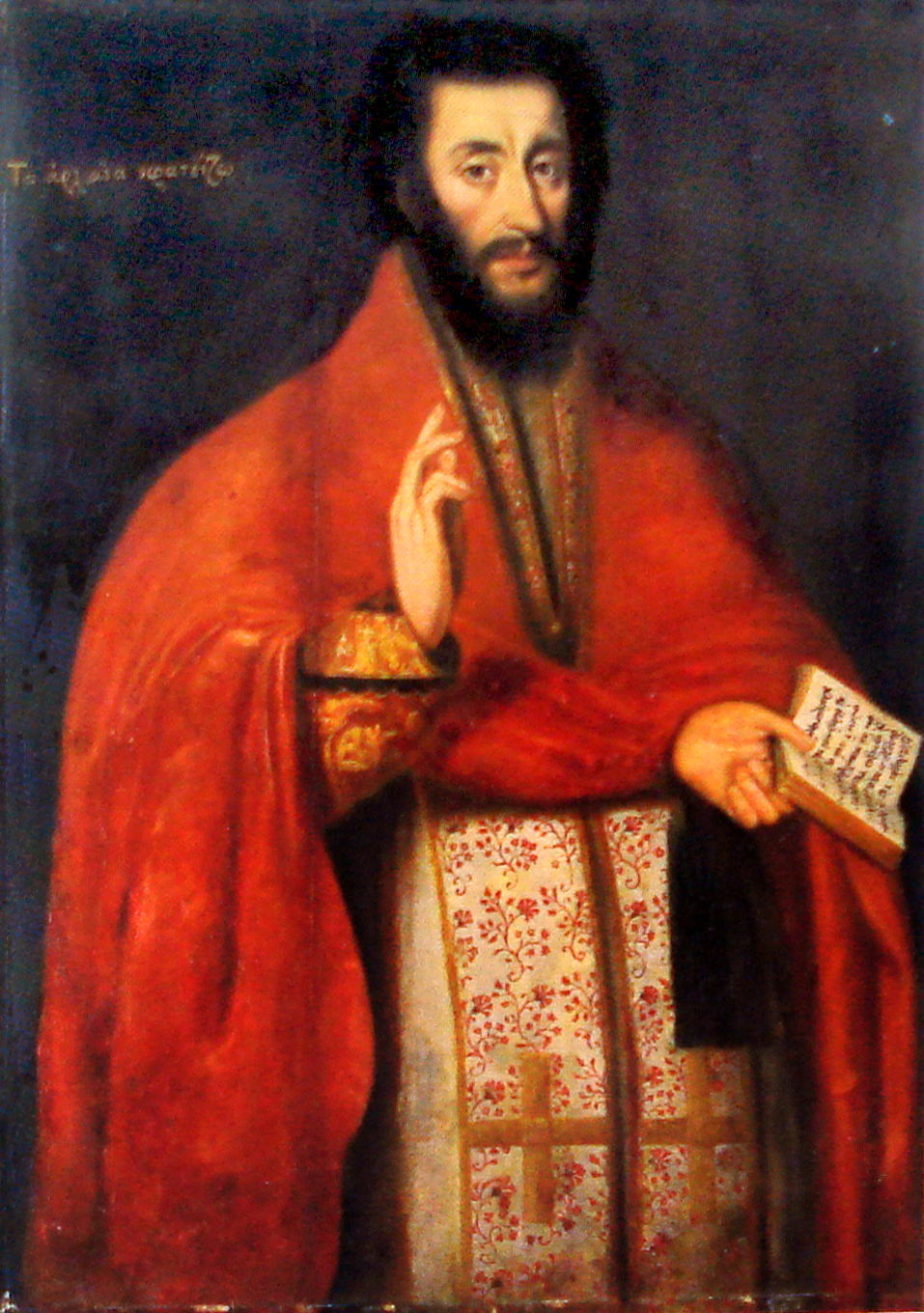
Greek priest by Nikolaos Kantounis

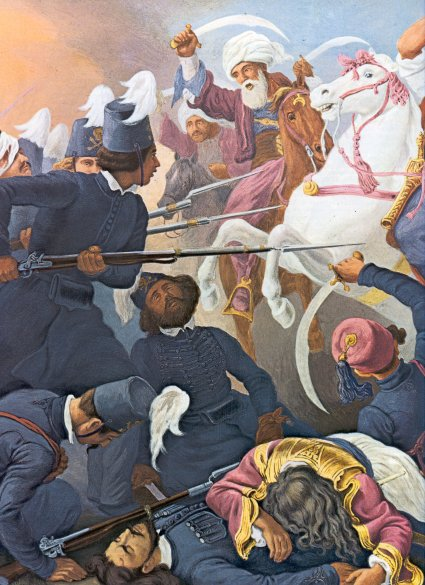
The Sacred Band in Draghasani by Peter von Hess

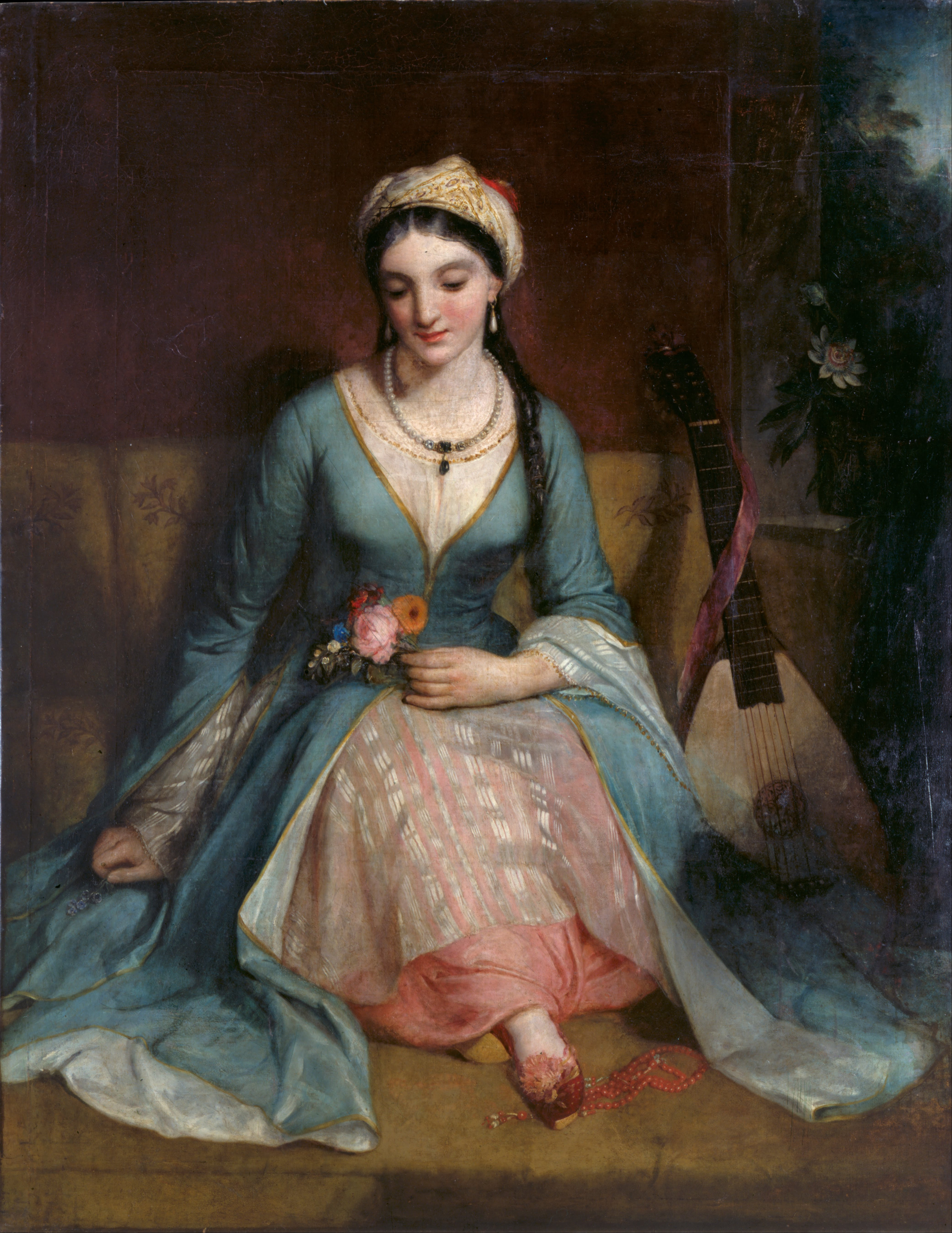
Henry Pickersgill: Greek maiden, 1829

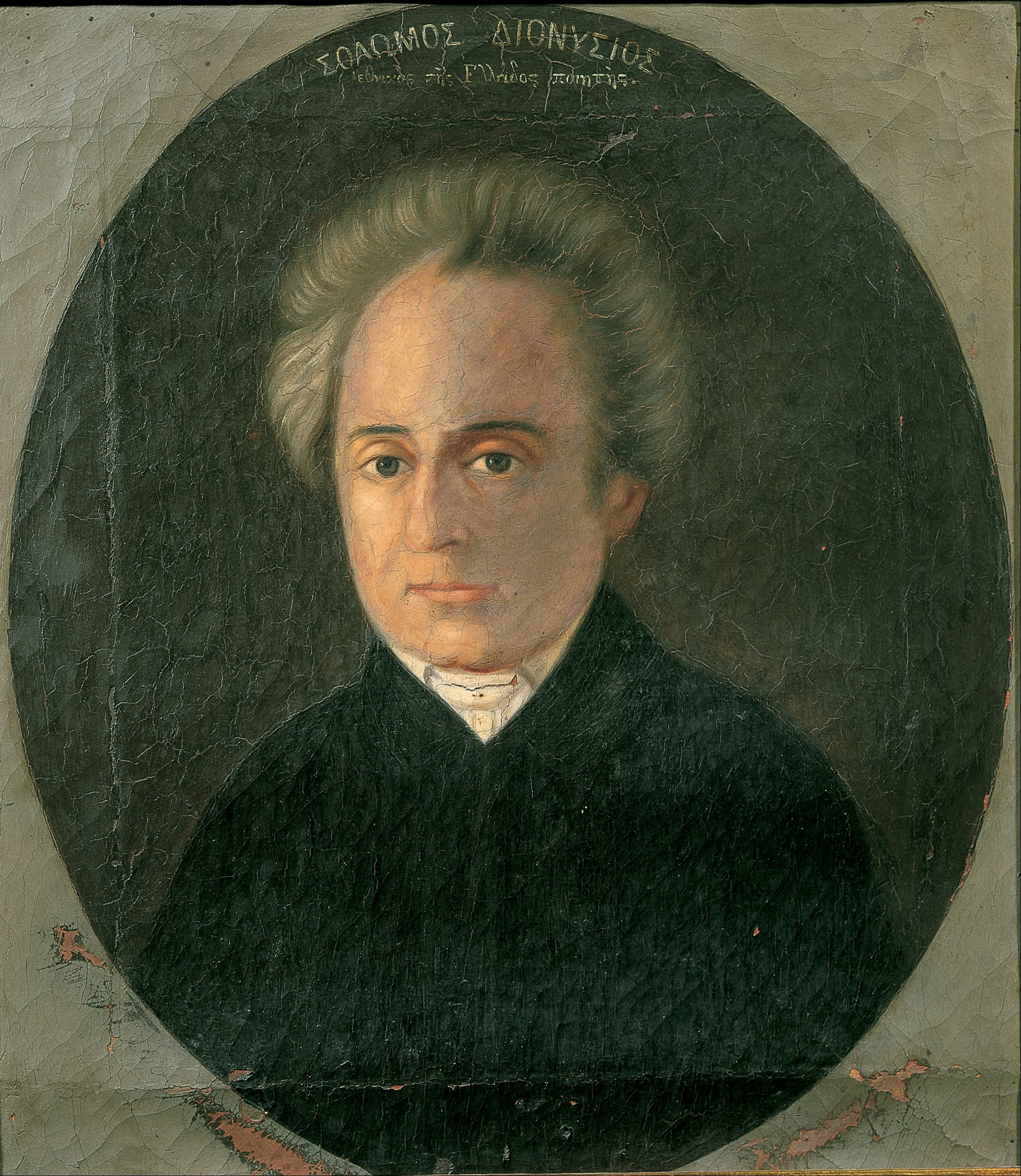
Dionysios Solomos, unknown artist

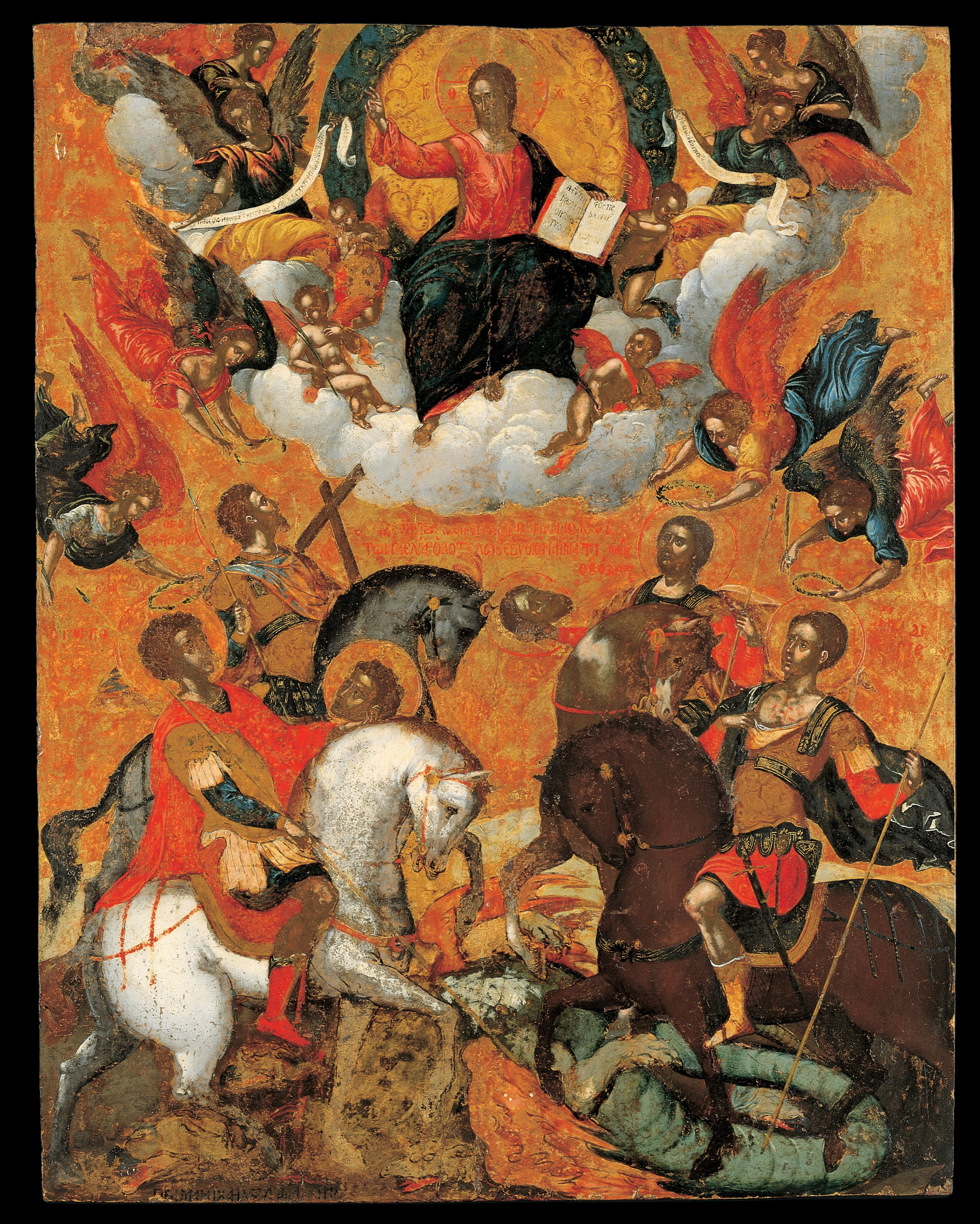
Four military saints by Michael Damaskenos

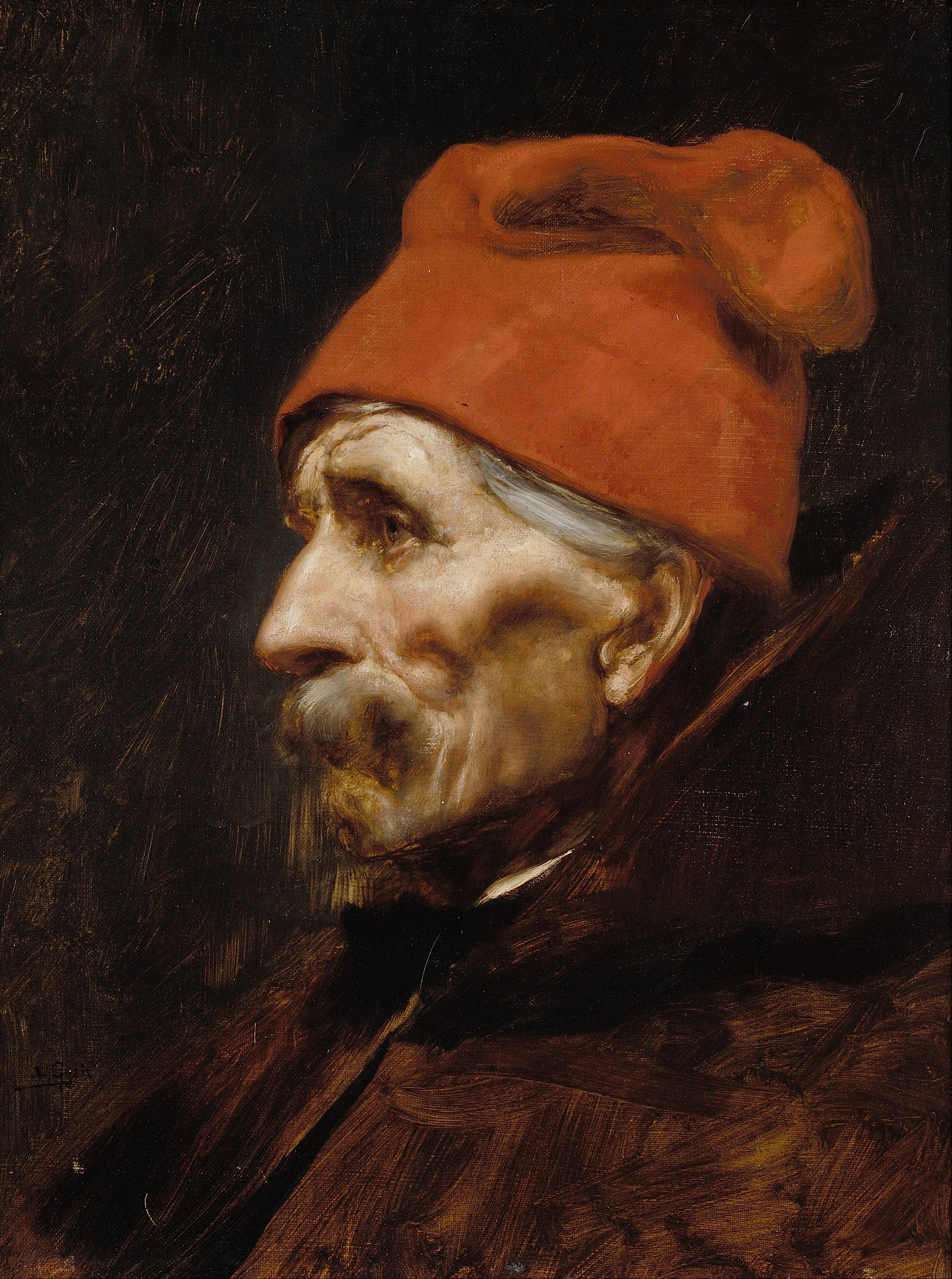
Old man wearing a red fez by Nikolaos Gyzis

== See also ==
- List of museums with major collections of Islamic art
- Cretan School
- Heptanese School

== Bibliography ==
- Hatzidakis, Manolis (1987). Έλληνες Ζωγράφοι μετά την Άλωση (1450-1830). Τόμος 1: Αβέρκιος - Ιωσήφ [Greek Painters after the Fall of Constantinople (1450-1830). Volume 1: Averkios - Iosif]. Athens: Center for Modern Greek Studies, National Research Foundation. hdl:10442/14844. ISBN 960-7916-01-8.
- Hatzidakis, Manolis; Drakopoulou, Evgenia (1997). Έλληνες Ζωγράφοι μετά την Άλωση (1450-1830). Τόμος 2: Καβαλλάρος - Ψαθόπουλος [Greek Painters after the Fall of Constantinople (1450-1830). Volume 2: Kavallaros - Psathopoulos]. Athens: Center for Modern Greek Studies, National Research Foundation. hdl:10442/14088. ISBN 960-7916-00-X.
- Drakopoulou, Evgenia (2010). Έλληνες Ζωγράφοι μετά την Άλωση (1450–1830). Τόμος 3: Αβέρκιος - Ιωσήφ [Greek Painters after the Fall of Constantinople (1450–1830). Volume 3: Averkios - Joseph]. Athens, Greece: Center for Modern Greek Studies, National Research Foundation. ISBN 978-960-7916-94-5.
- Vassilaki, Maria (2015). Working Drawings of Icon Painters after the Fall of Constantinople The Andreas Xyngopoulos Portfolio at the Benaki Museum. Athens, Greece: Leventis Gallery & Benaki Museum.
- Hatzidakis, Nano M. (1998). Icons, the Velimezis Collection: Catalogue Raisonné. Athens, Greece: Museum Benaki. ISBN 9789608452473.
