= Periklis Tsirigotis =

Greek painter

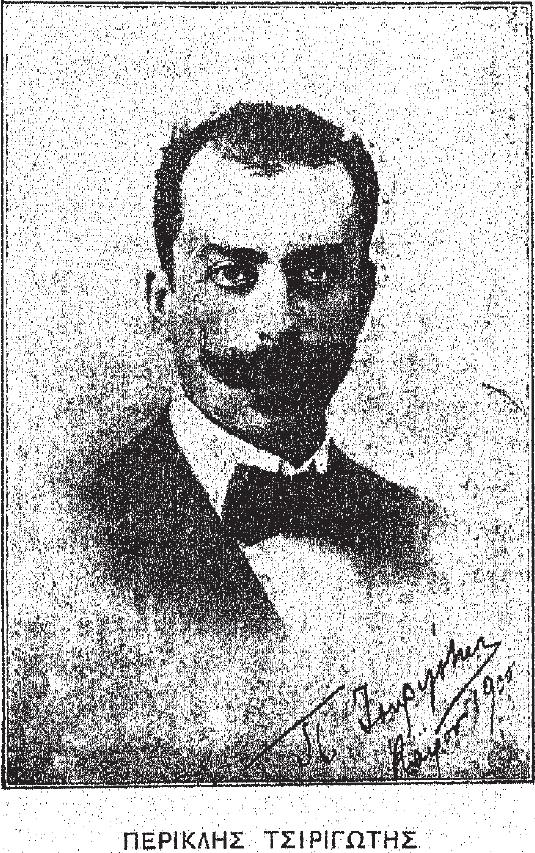
- Periklis Tsirigotis in 1903
- Born: 1860; Corfu
- Died: 1924 (aged 63–64); Cairo, Egypt
- Education: Charalambos Pachis, Corfu; Accademia di Belle Arti di Napoli
- Known for: Painter
- Movement: Orientalist

Periklis Tsirigotis (Greek: Περικλής Τσιριγώτης; 1860, Corfu - 1924, Cairo) was a Greek Impressionist Orientalist painter. Another Greek painter who was also an Impressionist Orientalist active in Cairo around the same period was Théodore Ralli.

== Biography ==
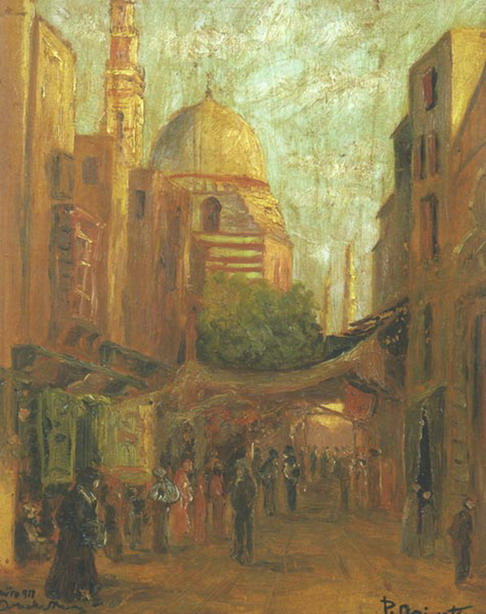
A Lane in Cairo

He was born in Corfu and had his first art lessons there from Charalambos Pachis, who introduced him to the other painters in the Heptanese School.

After leaving Corfu, he studied at the Accademia di Belle Arti di Napoli with Domenico Morelli and Gaetano Marinelli. From there, he went to Rome to complete his studies. He briefly returned to Corfu, but soon left for Cairo to do restorative work at various Greek Orthodox churches there.

He also established a studio and gave private lessons, but eventually took a position as a teacher at a local French Jesuit school.

Although he did some portraits, he focused on the people and landscapes of Egypt. He exhibited at Olympia in 1888, Berlin in 1896, at the Zappeion in 1898 and was one of the first to help establish regular exhibitions in Cairo. His paintings were shown and sold in London, New York and Saint Petersburg.

Eight large paintings of his may be seen at the Patriarchal Church of Saint Nicholas in Cairo. Many of his works are kept at the National Gallery in Athens.

== See also ==
- List of Orientalist artists
- Orientalism
