= George Pastakas =

Greek painter

George Pastakas (born Florina, 1956) is a Greek painter. His work is influenced by humanistic and anthropocentric ideas and often his works contain references to history or landscapes that have inspired him (e.g.Tinos Island or Herculean feats).

He has exhibited both in Greece and internationally and has collaborated with the Hellenic Olympic Committee, the Greek Ministry of Culture and the Piraeus Bank Cultural Foundation.
