= Bularchus =

Bularchus (Ancient Greek: Βούλαρχος) was an Ancient Greek painter; Pliny indicates that he was working in the 8th century BC, during the reign of Candaules, King of Lydia.

== Life ==
Bularchus' Battle of the Magnesians, is the earliest picture of which the ancient writers have left a description. The artist appears to have flourished in the late 8th century BC, as, according to Pliny, this picture was purchased for as much gold as would cover its surface by Candaules, King of Lydia, who died in about 700 B.C.

After Bularchus we encounter a gap of upwards of two centuries and a half in the history of Greek painting. It appears, however, that it was practised on the island of Rhodes, at the time of Anacreon, who lived about 600 years before Christ. That poet, in his twenty-eighth and twenty-ninth Odes, mentions the practice of encaustic painting.
