= Eleni Diamanti =

Greek engineer and researcher

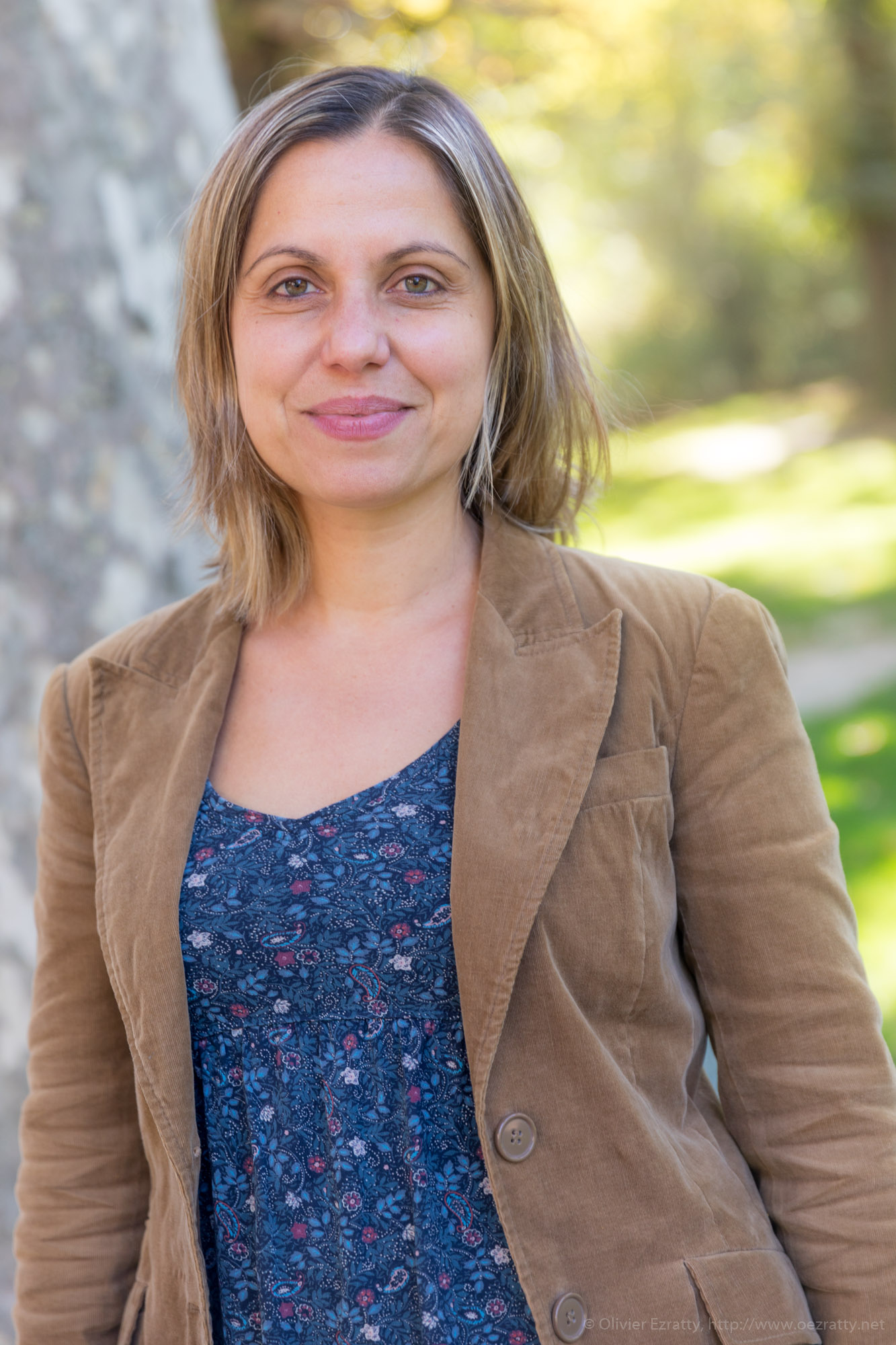
- Diamanti in 2020
- Born: Greece
- Education: National Technical University of Athens; Stanford University
- Scientific career
- Workplaces: French National Centre for Scientific Research
- Thesis: Security and implementation of differential phase shift quantum key distribution systems (2006)
- Website: Eleni Diamanti

Eleni Diamanti is a Greek engineer who is a researcher at the French National Centre for Scientific Research (CNRS). Diamanti serves as Director of the Paris Centre for Quantum Computing. She was awarded a European Research Council Starting Grant in 2018.

== Early life and education ==
Diamanti is from Greece. She was an undergraduate student at the National Technical University of Athens, where she majored in electrical and computer engineering. She moved to the United States for graduate studies, joining Stanford University as a Master's student. She remained at Stanford for her doctoral research, where she looked at the implementation of phase shift quantum key distribution systems. After graduating, Diamanti returned to Europe, where she joined Institut d'Optique as a Marie Skłodowska-Curie Actions Fellow. She completed her habilitation at the Paris Diderot University in 2014.

== Research and career ==
Diamanti was appointed to the faculty at the French National Centre for Scientific Research (CNRS) in 2009. Her research considers experimental quantum cryptography and the development of photonics sources for quantum networks. Alongside developing encryption software using quantum technology, Diamanti was made Vice Director of the Paris Center for Quantum Computing. In this capacity she takes part in the European Union Quantum Flagship. She was awarded a Prime d'Excellence Scientifique from the CNRS in 2013. In 2018 Diamanti was awarded a European Research Council Starting Grant. In 2024 she received the Innovation Medal by the CNRS.

== Selected publications ==
- M Peev; C Pacher; R Alléaume; et al. (2 July 2009). "The SECOQC quantum key distribution network in Vienna". New Journal of Physics. 11 (7) 075001. Bibcode:2009NJPh...11g5001P. doi:10.1088/1367-2630/11/7/075001. ISSN 1367-2630.
- Paul Jouguet; Sébastien Kunz-Jacques; Anthony Leverrier; Philippe Grangier; Eleni Diamanti (14 April 2013). "Experimental demonstration of long-distance continuous-variable quantum key distribution". Nature Photonics. 7 (5): 378–381. arXiv:1210.6216. doi:10.1038/NPHOTON.2013.63. ISSN 1749-4885.
- Carsten Langrock; Eleni Diamanti; Rostislav V Roussev; Yoshihisa Yamamoto; M M Fejer; Hiroki Takesue (1 July 2005). "Highly efficient single-photon detection at communication wavelengths by use of upconversion in reverse-proton-exchanged periodically poled LiNbO3 waveguides". Optics Letters. 30 (13): 1725–1727. doi:10.1364/OL.30.001725. ISSN 0146-9592. PMID 16075551.
