= Charalambos Pachis =

Greek painter

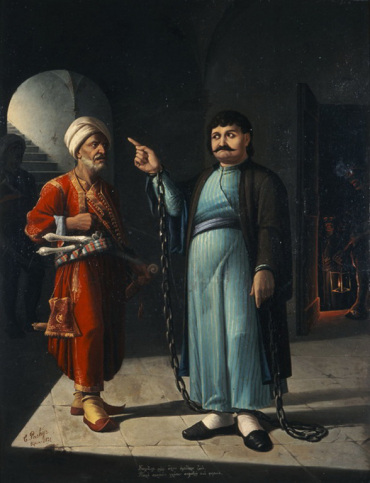
An Allegory on the life of Rigas Feraios (1871)

Charalambos Pachis (Greek: Χαράλαμπος Παχής; 1844, Corfu – 1891, Corfu) was a Greek painter of the Heptanese school who specialized in landscapes and historical scenes.

== Biography ==
Pachis was born in c. 1844. He was still very young when he was working as a servant for a wealthy Englishman, who saw his work and offered to pay his expenses to study in Italy. At first Pachis attended painting lessons at the Accademia di San Luca and later at the Accademia di Belle Arti di Napoli. Pachis was influenced by the work of Dionysios Tsokos and the philhellene artists of the 19th century.

After a study trip to various European cities, he returned to Corfu in 1870, where he taught briefly at the "Kapodistrias School". Following that, he established his own private art school. Periklis Tsirigotis, Angelos Giallinas and Georgios Samartzis were among his best-known students. He apparently put together a huge collection of costumes for use in his classes, which he later sold to provide dowries for his daughters, one of whom married Samartzis. His other daughter also married a painter; Spiros Pizanis.

His most famous historical scenes are depictions of the assassination of Kapodistrias, the Dance of Zalongo and the hanging of Gregory V. He also painted portraits, landscapes and illustrations for hagiographic works. He was one of the first painters of the Heptanese school to create landscapes and genre scenes. Pachis' creations also include the iconography at the Greek Orthodox Church in Durrës.

He was honored with several awards from the Ionian regional government and the Vatican. His major showings include the National Exhibitions at the Zappeion in 1875 and 1888, and the Exposition Universelle (1878).

== Other selected paintings ==
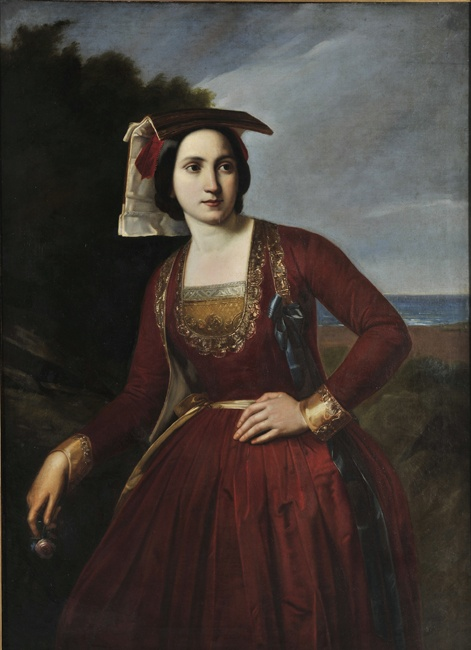
Portrait of a Young Girl

May Day on Corfu

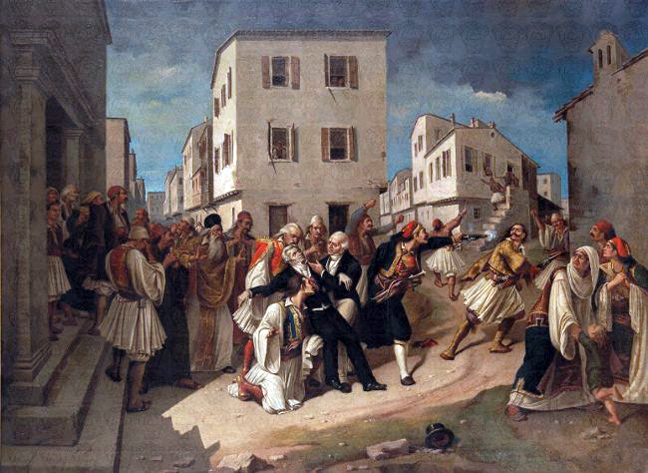
The Assassination of Ioannis Kapodistrias

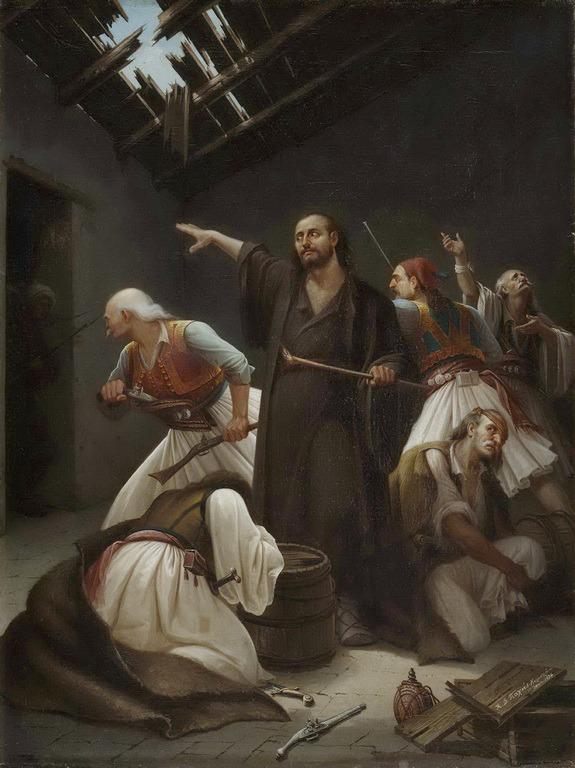
The Monk Samuel at the Fall of Souli
