= Nikolaos Himonas =

Russian painter

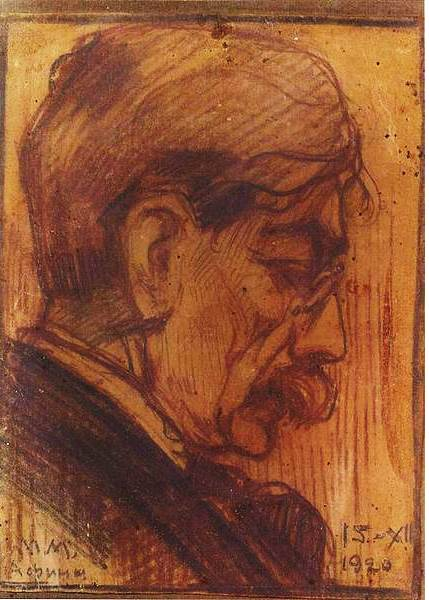
Nikolaos Himonas (1920). Drawing by "V. Marzhuvanov(a)"

Nikolaos Himonas (Greek: Νικόλαος Χειμώνας. Russian: Николай Петрович Химона; 25 September 1864 – 1 August 1929) was a painter and art teacher of Greek ancestry who was born in Russia and spent most of his life there. His name may also be transcribed in English as Heimonas or Cheimonas.

== Biography ==
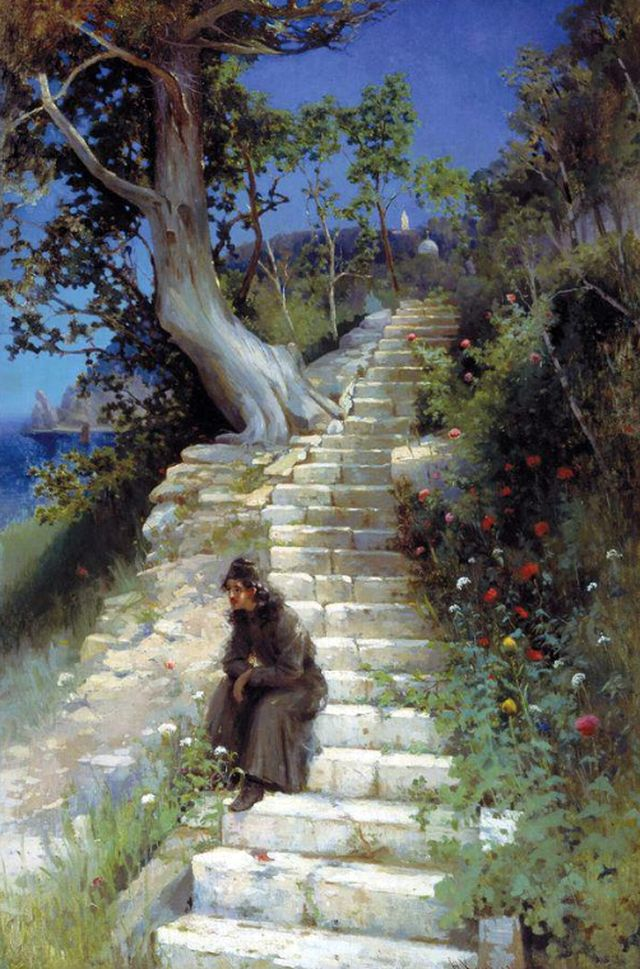
Anchorite on the Steps of the Temple

He was born in Yevpatoria. His father was a retired army sergeant from the Greek Battalion of Balaklava who had fought in the defense of Sebastopol during the Crimean War. His mother was descended from the Pontic Greeks who received asylum in Russia after the Russo-Turkish War of 1768–74. He grew up in Yalta, where the family was engaged in commercial enterprises, and received a well-rounded education.

Later, he attended the Saint Petersburg Art and Industry Academy then, in 1889, began auditing classes at the Imperial Academy of Arts, where his teachers included Ivan Shishkin and Arkhip Kuindzhi, with whom he became a lifelong friend. He graduated in 1897 and was able to travel with a group of Kuindzhi's students to Berlin, Dresden, Vienna and Paris.

In 1902, against her father's wishes, he married Olga Khitrova, a young woman from an old noble family who was only seventeen. Two years later, he made his first trip to Greece and stayed for a year. He taught painting at the "Imperial Society for the Encouragement of the Arts" from 1897 until 1919. From 1900, he was the Inspector there, and became a full member in 1909, the year that he helped create the "Kuindzhi Artists' Society". In 1916, he was named an Academician.

=== Leaving Russia ===
In 1919, during the Russian Civil War, Olga was denounced and arrested by the new government for transferring messages written by political prisoners. His attempts to free her failed, and only served to make his situation dangerous, so he sought refuge with relatives in Crimea and, when the opportunity arose, emigrated to Greece. After arriving, he spent several years travelling throughout the Peloponnese, Crete, and the islands on the west coast, painting landscapes and architectural sites. Eventually, due to her father's influence, Olga was freed and, with some searching, was able to rejoin him. After that, she essentially became his manager.

In 1929, they settled on Skyros, where he became ill with malaria and died as a result of an incorrect diagnosis and improper treatment. Later that year, Olga presented a major retrospective of his works in Athens and, the following year, in London. Some sources indicate that he actually died in London, but this apparently derives from his frequent visits there to exhibit, and to confusion with Olga who did, in fact, die there in 1963.

== Selected scenes from Greece ==
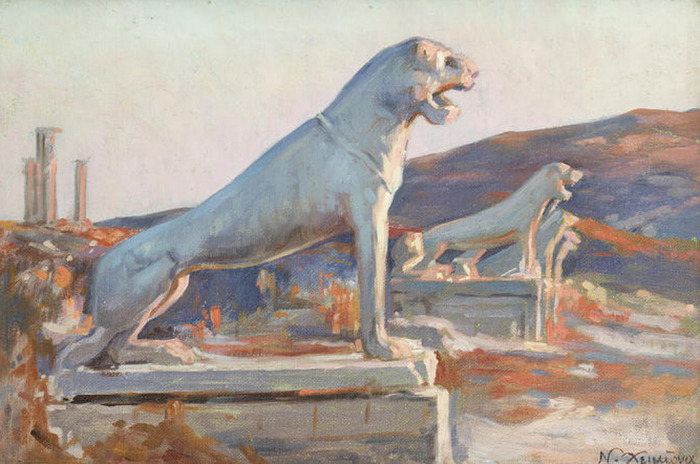
The Terrace of the Lions at Delos

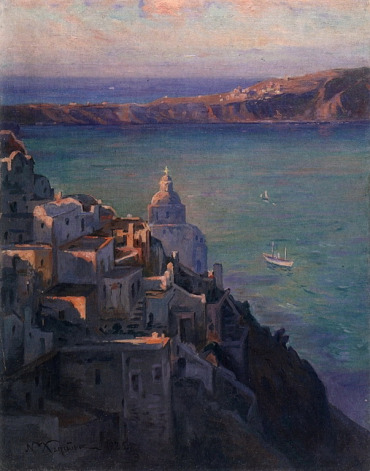
Santorini

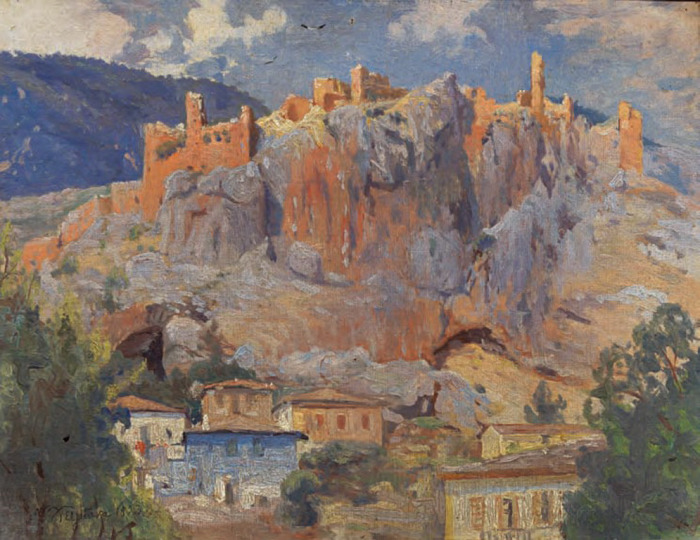
Amfissa

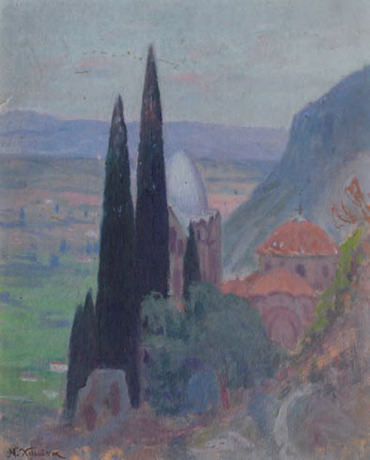
Mystras
