= Frissiras Museum =

Coordinates: 37°58′20.2″N 23°43′55.9″E

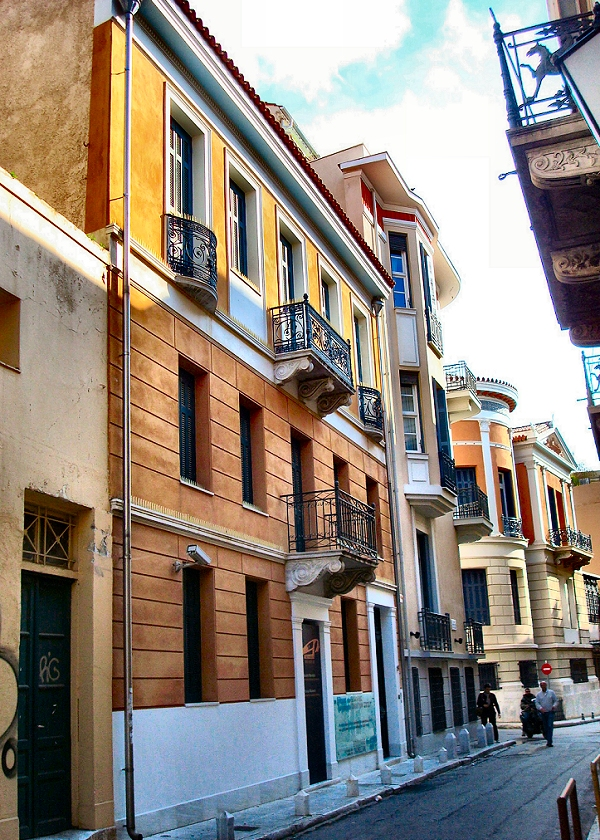
- Location: 3-7 Monis Asteriou, Plaka, Athens, Greece
- Type: Art museum
- Public transit access: Athens Metro stations: Syntagma Station
- Website: frissirasmuseum.com

Frissiras Museum is a contemporary painting museum in Plaka Athens, Greece. Its permanent collection consists of around 4000 paintings and sculptures by Greek and other European artists on the subject of the human form. Due to the relatively small size of the museum, its collection is displayed in rotating temporary exhibitions.

The museum was inaugurated by President of the Republic Konstantinos Stephanopoulos on November 27, 2000 and was officially opened by the Mayor of Athens Dimitris Avramopoulos on December 4, 2000.

The museum is a non-profit organisation founded and administered by the Frissiras family. It houses the private collection of Vlassis Frissiras, its founder, an attorney. He began collecting works by young Greek visual artists in 1978, with the aim of forming a collection consisting of paintings centered on the human form and body, and figurative painting that reinstates methodology marginalized by newer art forms. In the 1990s he began to focus on other European artists.
