= Diamantis Stagidis =

Greek contemporary artist

Diamantis Stagidis (born 1959) is a contemporary artist; primarily a painter in oils. He lives in Kavala. Although his artwork seems abstract, nothing is random, except for the wet colour. The lines dance, composing abstract figures reminding the viewers of familiar scenes moving at the edge between remembrance and oblivion. Therefore, the real meaning of the art is what cannot be said, the ineffability. Through Stagidis, the new movement of neo-renaissancian abstract art begins.

== Biographical Overview ==
Various exhibitions in Greece and from the beginning 2007 he collaborates with gallery in Los Angeles, New Orleans, Houston and LONDON. Stagidis has participated in the seventh Florence Biennale 2009 and in the third Athens Biennale 2011.
