= Mina Papatheodorou-Valiraki =

Greek painter

Mina Papatheodorou-Valyraki
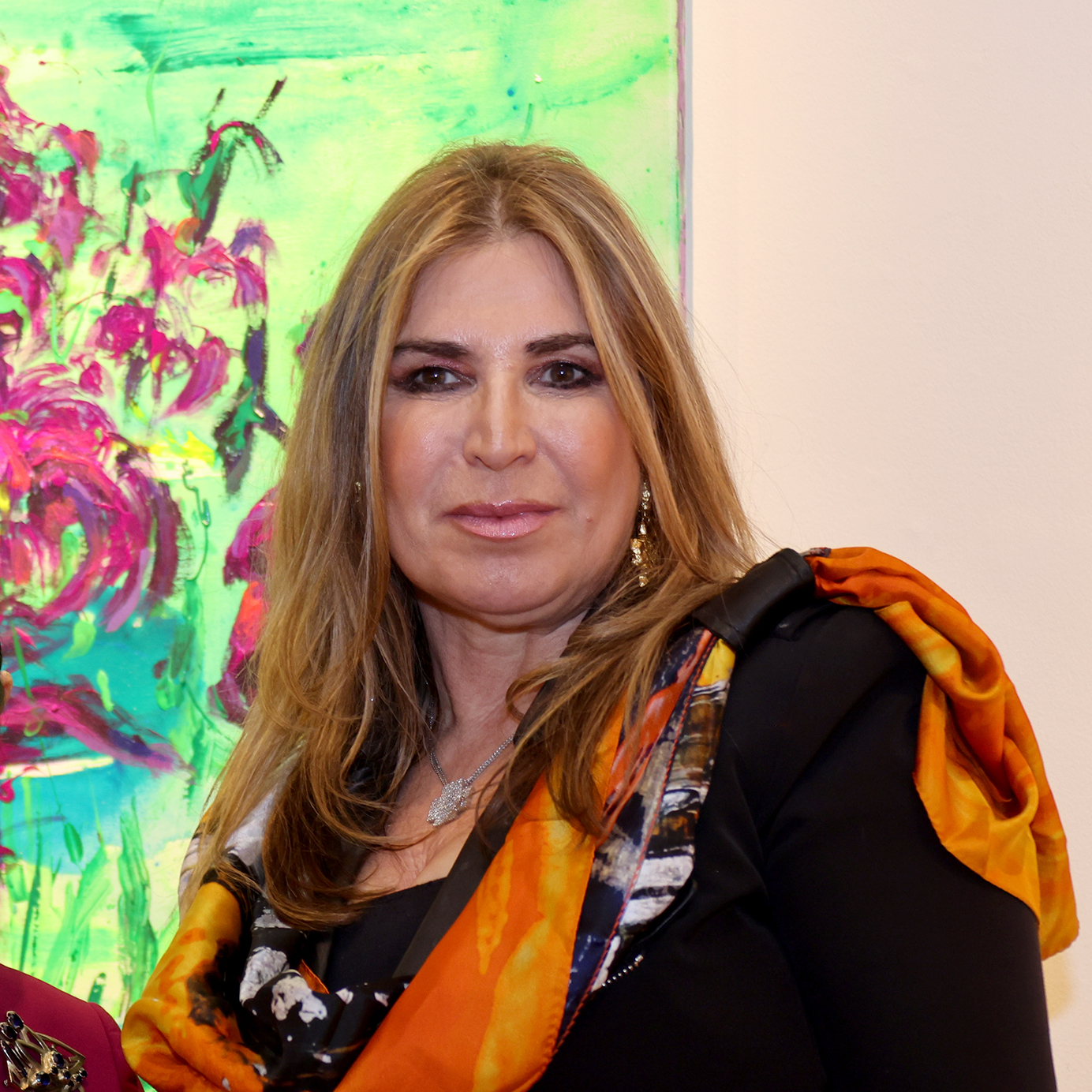
- Mina Papatheodorou-Valyraki
- Born: 1958 (age 67–68); Athens
- Education: Highest School of Fine Arts of the National Technical University of Athens; PhD studies in Art History at the University of Florence
- Occupation: Greek artist
- Spouse: Sifis Valyrakis
- Writing career
- Language: Greek, English, French, Italian
- Subjects: ASAMA Museum of the Academy of Sports, Alabama, US; National Museum of Women in the Arts, Washington; National Gallery of Athens; Olympic Museum of Lausanne; Museum of Barcelona; United Nations General Assembly Building in New York; Museo Lamborghini in Italy
- Notable awards: U.S.S.A ACADEMY AWARD, SPORT ARTIST OF THE YEAR, 2002
- Website: www.minapapatheodorou.gr

Mina Papatheodorou-Valiraki (Greek: Μίνα Παπαθεοδώρου-Βαλυράκη, translit. Mina Papatheodorou-Balyrake, transcr. Mina Papatheodorou Valiraki is a Greek painter specialising in sports-related subjects.

== Life ==
Valiraki was born in Athens, Greece.

From 1975 to 1980, she studied painting at the Athens School of Fine Arts under Professor Yiannis Moralis. In 1986, she received her Ph.D. from the University of Florence. She was married to the late Sifis Valirakis, the former Greek Minister of Sport, and had two children with him.

She is frequently listed as Mina Papatheodorou Valyraki in English, a spelling that combines elements of 2 approaches to transcribing Modern Greek names, alternatively she is sometimes listed by her maiden name of Mina Papatheodorou only, or as Mina Valirakis, using the nominative instead of the genitive form of her husband's surname. (See Greek surnames for more information on women's surname practices in Greece).

== Works ==
Valiraki's works are exhibited in the National Gallery of Athens, the Olympic Museum of Lausanne, and the National Museum of Women in the Arts of Washington, D.C., among others. Her one-woman shows include exhibitions at the Galleria Ca' d'Oro in Rome, 1993; the CART Art Gallery in Italy, 1999; and Monte Carlo, 2000, for the 58th Monaco Grand Prix. Her work "La Storia Della Lamborghini, 35 years" was commissioned by Automobili Lamborghini in June 1998 to decorate the industry's hall in Sant'Agata Bolognese, Italy, and has hung there since 1999.

Valiraki's works were used as official posters for the 2002 Winter Olympics.
