= Choereae =

Town in ancient Euboea, in the territory of Eretria

Choereae or Choireai (Ancient Greek: Χοιρέαι) was a town in ancient Euboea, in the territory of Eretria. It was a deme of Eretria. During the Greco-Persian Wars, it was a landing spot of the Persians in 490 BCE in their attack on Eretria.
