= Archaeological Museum of Eretria =

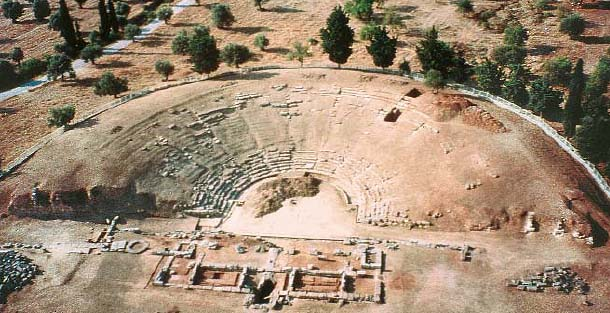
- Ancient theatre in Eretria
- Established: 1960
- Location: Eretria, Euboea regional unit, Central Greece
- Coordinates: 38.3961°N 23.78956°E
- Type: Archaeological museum

The Archaeological Museum of Eretria is a museum in Eretria, in the Euboea regional unit of Central Greece.

The museum was established in 1960, but was enlarged between 1961 and 1962. It underwent further renovation and extension between 1987 and 1991 by the 11th Ephorate of Antiquities of the Greek Archaeological Service in collaboration with the Swiss School of Archaeology in Greece.

== Collection ==
The museum, which is located adjacent to the archaeological site of Eretria, contains artifacts unearthed at Xeropolis, the cemetery of Skoumbri, Palaia Perivolia, and Toumba in Lefkandi, at Paliochora and Geraki hill in Amarynthos and at Eretria and Magoula. Many artifacts found at Eretria though are on display at the National Archaeological Museum in Athens and in the Louvre in Paris.

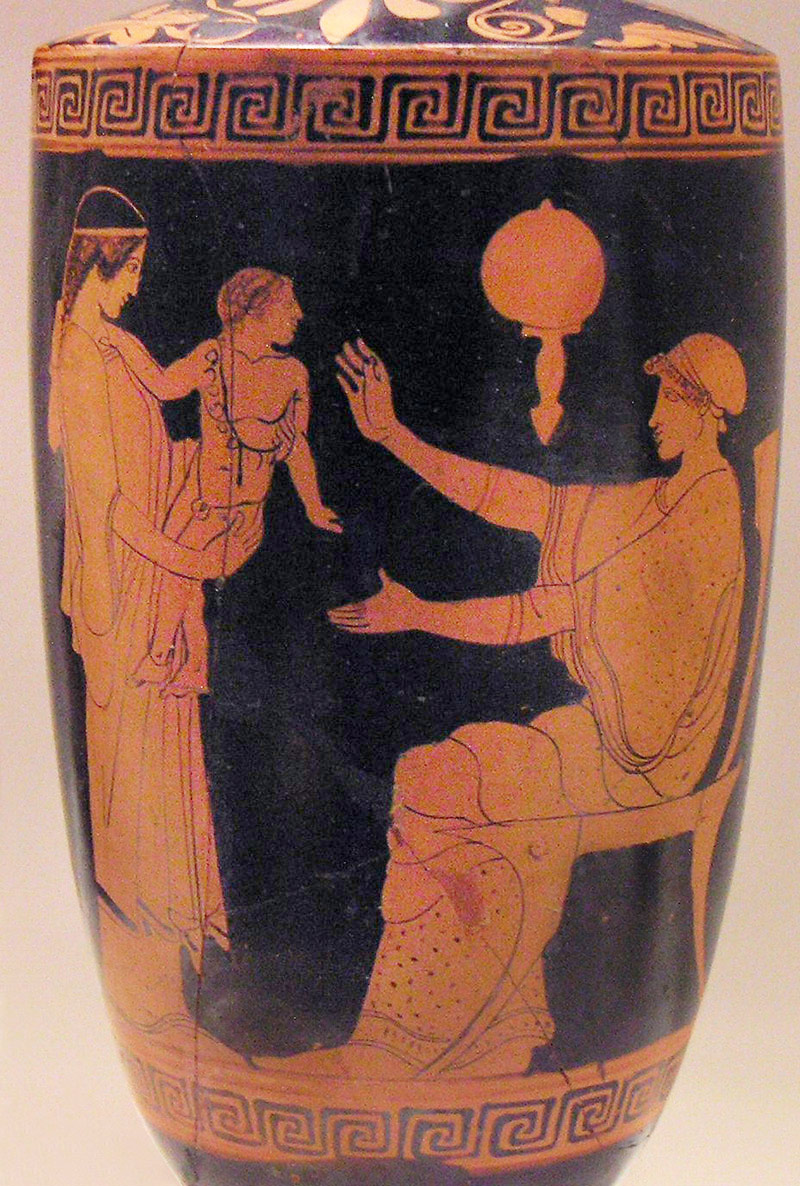
An example of the type of pottery found at Eretria. This particular item though is on display at the National Archaeological Museum in Athens

Of major note is the terracotta centaur from Lefkandi, dated to the second half of the 10th century BC. The figurine was discovered broken in two parts, each of which had been placed in a different grave. Also found at Lefkandi is a straight-sided Mycenaean alabastron with three handles, dated to the 12th century BC. The decoration is in matt white paint on a dark surface, and the shoulder and body are covered with the figures of a griffin, a roe and a deer.

The museum has a black-figure epinetron from Amarynthos dated to the end of the 6th century BC. The funerary amphora, depicting geometric patterns and birds, contained the bones of a child and is a product of a local Euboean workshop of the Geometric period, dated to the 8th century BC. There are also many more amphoras and vases, including a funerary amphora from the coastal necropolis of Eretria dated to 560 BC which depicts the battle between Herakles and Centaurs on the front and Potnia Theron (Mistress of the Animals) on the rear, and a Panathenaic amphora dated to around 363-362 BC. The front side of the amphora depicts the armed goddess Athena, while the rear illustrates a scene from the Panathenaic contest for which the vase was the prize. Also is the terracotta gorgoneion dated from the 4th century BC which belonged to the decoration of the House with the Mosaics at Eretria.

Excavation at Eretria has unearthed some notable sculptures which are on display in the museum, including those from the west pediment of the archaic temple of Apollo Daphnephoros that depict an Amazonomachy. Of particular note is the sculpture representing Theseus and Antiope, believed to have been made by the famous Athenian sculptor Antenor in the 6th century BC.

The museum also contains Archaic relief pithos fragments decorated with representations of birds devouring bodies dated to the 7th century BC and a necklace made of faience beads representing Isis and Horos possibly from Cyprus and dating from the Protogeometric period, 11th-10th centuries BC.

== Gallery ==
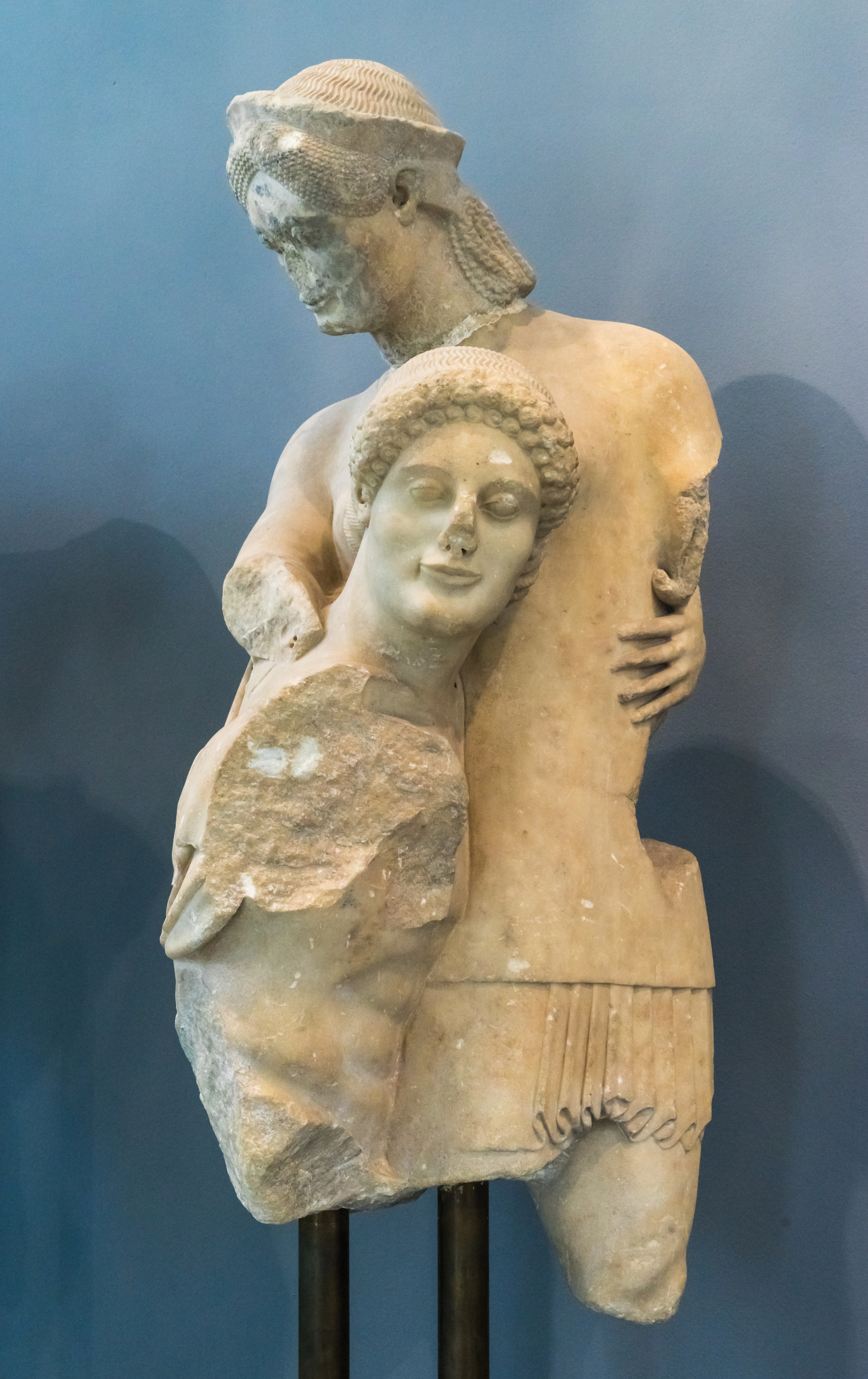
Theseus and Antiope, ca.510 BCE.

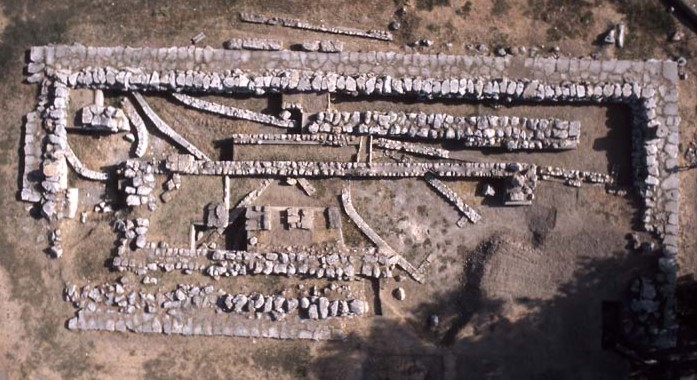
Aerial view of the archaic temple of Apollo Daphnephoros

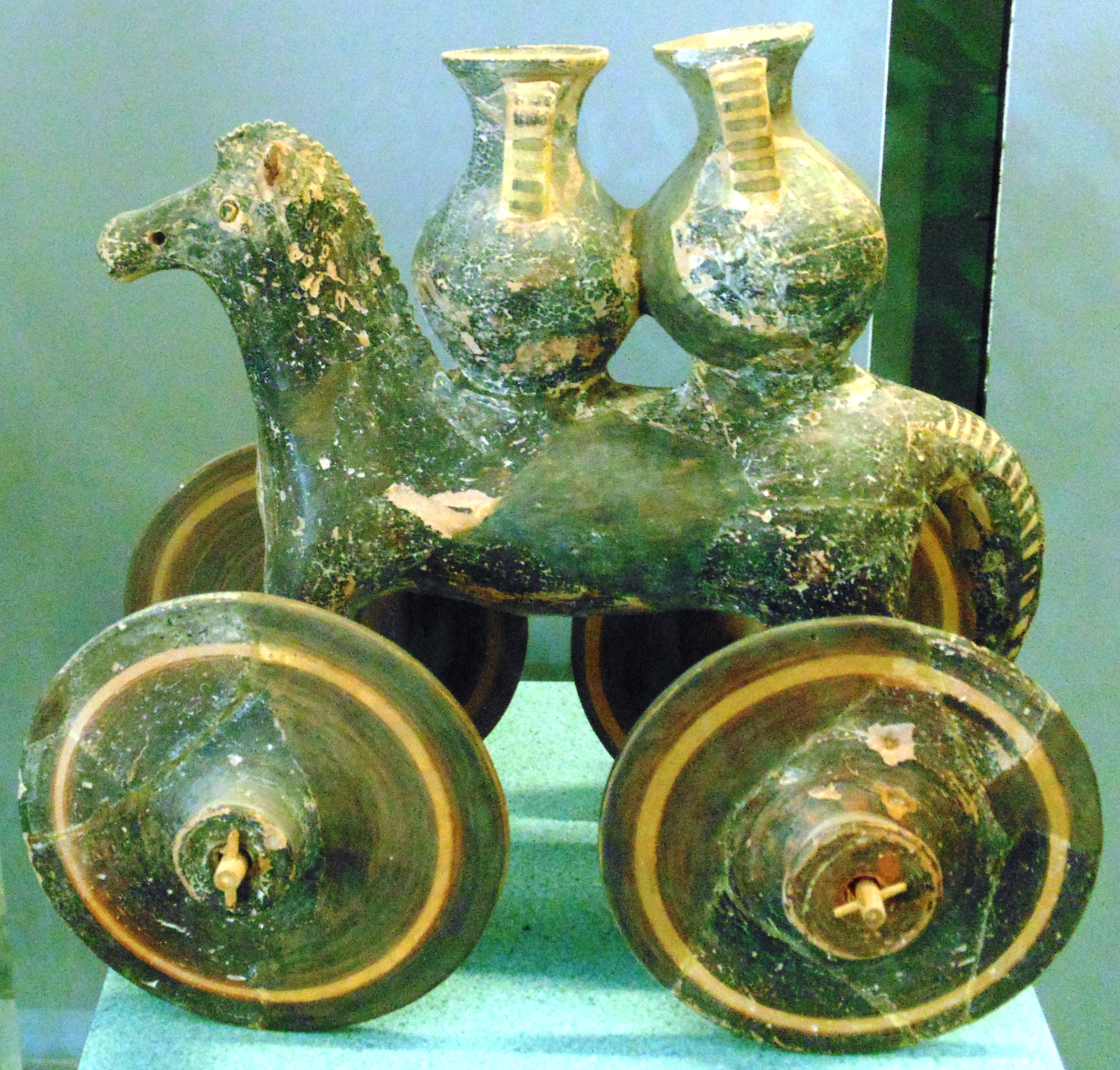
Part of Geometric and archaic period collection.

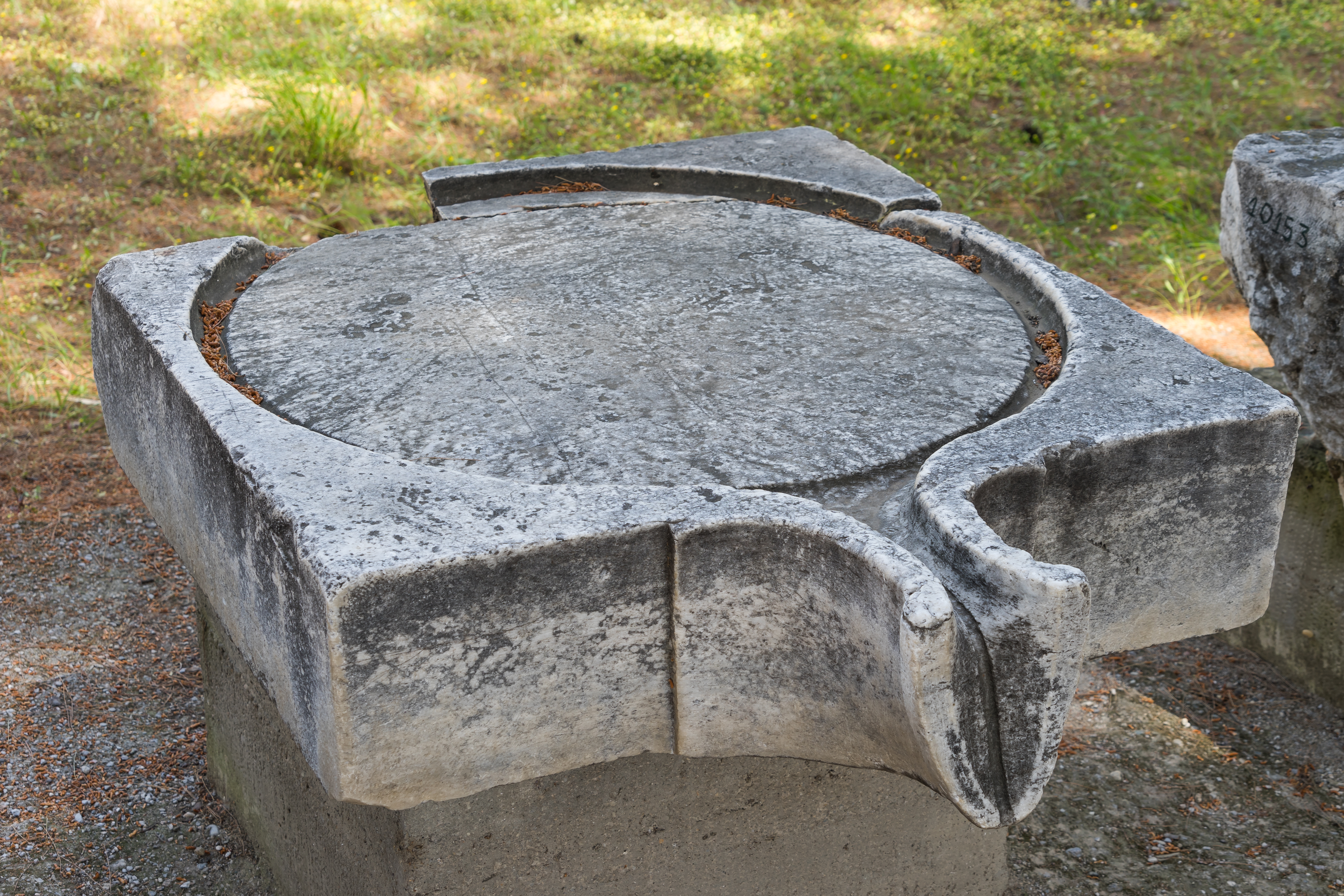
Ancient Greek or Roman piece of a wine- or olive-press

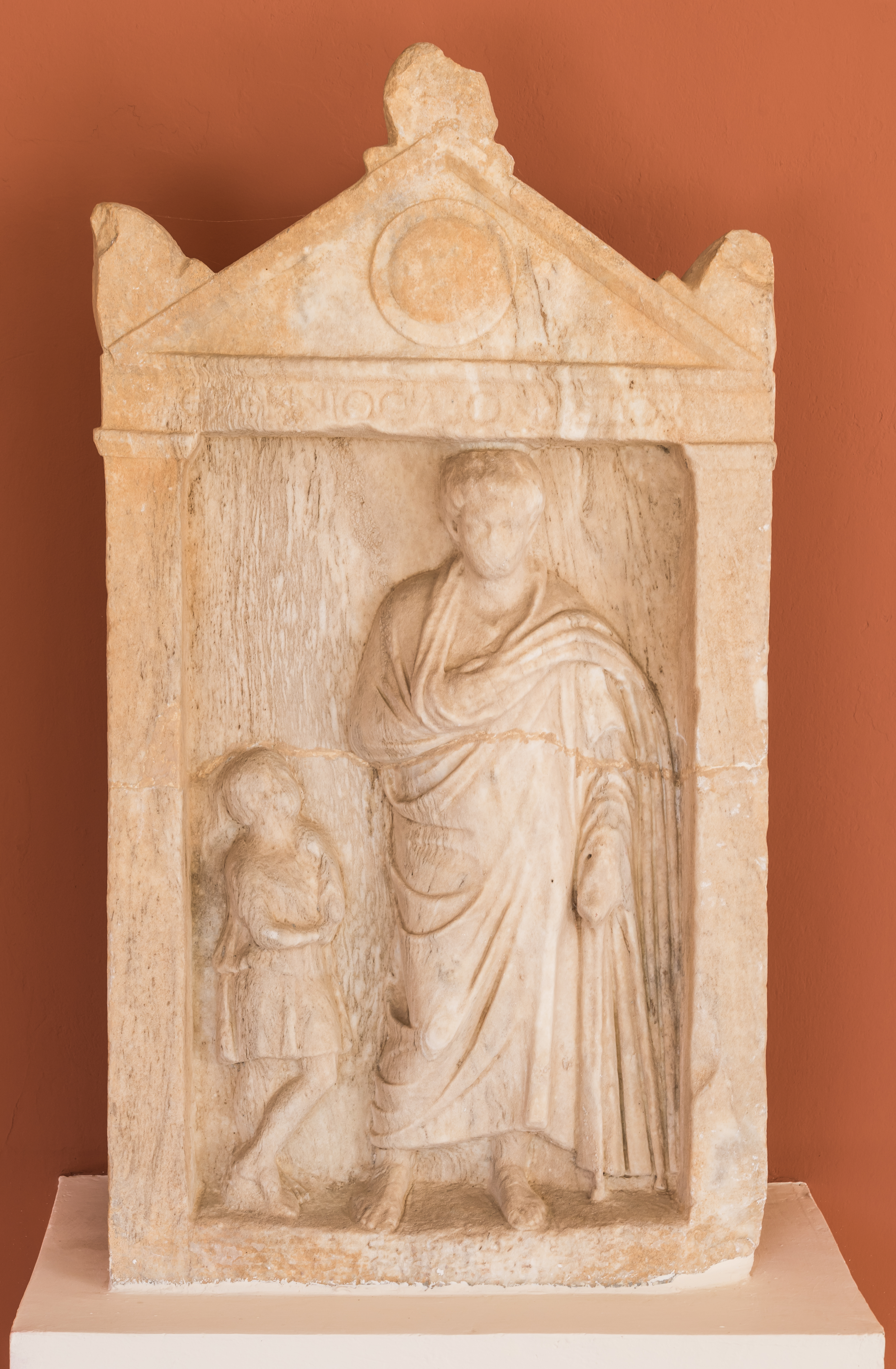
Funerary stele with a man and a boy.
