= Galleria Ca' d'Oro =

Galleria Ca' d'Oro is an international contemporary art gallery curated and organized by Gloria Porcella. The gallery was founded in Rome by Antonio Porcella in 1970, and currently has three locations in Rome, Miami, and New York City.

Galleria Ca’ d’Oro is the culmination of four generations of Italian writers, artists, and curators. The legacy began with Alpinolo Porcella, a writer, artist, and close friend of Filippo de Pisis and Giorgio de Chirico. Alpinolo's son, Amadore Porcella, continued the family's tradition as an art critic and principal writer for L’Osservatore Romano. Amadore founded Galleria San Bernardo in Piazza San Bernardo in 1945, and in 1970, his son Antonio opened Galleria Ca’ d’Oro. The gallery originally opened on Via Condotti, then moved to the Piazza di Spagna. The gallery is currently located on Via Del Babuino.

In 1982, Antonio collaborated with painter and printmaker Renzo Vespignani at The Collaboration of ACTAS-Platea Estate at Castel Sant’Angelo. In 1983, Antonio helped to curate the "Spes Contra Spem" show by painter Renato Guttuso. Antonio was also the director of figurative art for the Platea Estate 1983 and collaborated with Italian sculptor Emilio Greco. In 1986, Galleria Ca’ d’Oro presented the sculptures of Salvador Dalí in Paris at FIAC. In 1990, the Porcella family launched La Fondazione Giorgio e Isa de Chirico. Antonio's daughter, Gloria brought Galleria Ca' d'Oro to Miami in 2010, and to New York City in 2014.

Today, Galleria Ca' D'Oro is curated by Antonio's daughter, Gloria Porcella, who was raised in Rome and studied at San Diego State University. The gallery currently represents artists John Seward Johnson II, Alfredo Rapetti Mogol (a.k.a. Cheope), Ewa Bathelier, Erika Calesini, the Cracking Art Group and Blue and Joy.
