= Pharbelus =

Town in ancient Macedonia

Pharbelus or Pharbelos (Ancient Greek: Φάρβηλος) was a town of the Chalcidice in ancient Macedonia. It belonged to the Delian League since it appears in the tribute records of Athens between 454/3 and 433/2 BCE, as well as in a tributary decree of 422/1 BCE. It is probable that it was one of the cities that rebelled against Athens in the year 432 BCE. Pharbelus is mentioned by Stephanus of Byzantium, who says it was a city of Eretria; this has been interpreted as either that Pharbelus was an Eretrian colony or there was an otherwise unknown town of that name in Euboea.

Its site is unlocated.
