= ESAG =

ESAG may refer to:

- École Suisse d'Archéologie en Grèce (Swiss School of Archaeology in Greece)
- École supérieure de design, d'art graphique et d'architecture intérieure (Penninghen school or ESAG Penninghen), a high school in Paris
- Expression site associated gene, a gene found in the bloodstream expression site of the variable surface glycoproteins of the sleeping sickness parasite, Trypanosoma brucei
- Eksperimentinė sportinės aviacijos gamykla (Lithuanian glider manufacturer later privatized as Sportinė Aviacija)
