= Sifis Valirakis =

Greek politician (1943–2021)

Sifis Valirakis Σήφης Βαλυράκης
- Born: Iosif Valirakis; Ιωσήφ Βαλυράκης; 12 March 1943; Chania, Crete Kingdom of Greece
- Died: 24 January 2021 (aged 77); Eretria, Greece
- Occupation: Politician
- Known for: Politics, anti-junta resistance
- Title: Minister of Public Order
- Term: 1995–1996
- Predecessor: Stelios Papathemelis
- Successor: Kostas Geitonas
- Political party: PASOK
- Spouse: Mina Papatheodorou-Valiraki

Iosif (Sifis) Valirakis (Greek: Ιωσήφ (Σήφης) Βαλυράκης, 12 March 1943 – 24 January 2021) was a Greek politician of Panhellenic Socialist Movement (PASOK) political party. His first name, the Greek form of Joseph, is commonly represented in its Cretan diminutive Sifis ("Joe"), by which he is popularly known.

== Life ==
He was born in 1943 in Chania on the island of Crete. His father, Ioannis Valirakis, was an officer in the Hellenic Army and a member of the Centre Union party. He studied electrical engineering in Germany and Sweden, with a specialization in industrial automation. He spoke English, German and Swedish in addition to Greek.

=== Anti-junta activity ===
As a leading member of the anti-junta resistance and of the armed branch of the Panhellenic Liberation Movement, Valirakis was wanted by the Greek military regime for three years for bombings and was finally apprehended in 1971 and jailed by the Special Investigative Section (ETA) of the Greek Military Police (ESA). Nevertheless, he escaped by cutting the bars of his cell and causing a short-circuit in the jail's electrical grid. He remained on the loose in Athens for fifteen days before fleeing his safe house for Patras, where he hopped on the roof of a train that was heading to Yugoslavia. Unluckily for him, the train stopped for provisioning at the border, and he was captured and retaken into custody. After that incident, he was transported to a prison on the island of Corfu, to a new cell with extra strong bars.

At length he made another escape, this time by swimming to Albania. He avoided hypothermia by covering himself with butter stolen from a prison kitchen, and kept his clothes dry in a nylon bag. But when he got there, the regime of Enver Hoxha thought that he was a spy for the Greek junta, and initially sentenced him to three years hard labour at a camp near Fier. The conditions at Fier were worse than the military prisons under the junta in Greece, and for fifteen days he was cold, over-worked and on punishment, in which he was permitted fifteen grammes of meat in the morning, his sole ration for each day in that period. However, he was fortunate at that time as Andreas Papandreou was mobilizing his contacts in the international Maoist and Sinophile movements — Albania at that time was a major satellite of Maoist China — to save him. At long last, the then-Sovereign Prince and once-and-future King of Cambodia, Norodom Sihanouk, a close friend of Andreas Papandreou, intervened with the Chinese, who then intervened with the Albanians, and thus Sifis Valirakis was released.

=== Political career ===
After the fall of the junta, he was elected to parliament the first time for Andreas Papandreou's Panhellenic Socialist Movement (PASOK) in 1977. He was appointed Deputy Minister of Transport and Communications (October 1981 - November 1984), Deputy Minister of Culture and Sport (July 1985 - June 1988), Deputy Minister of Public Order (June 1988 - July 1989 and July 1994 - March 1995) and Minister of Public Order (March 1995 - January 1996).

On 1 February 2009, Sifis Valirakis was detained for several hours by American authorities immediately after his arrival at the airport in New York, because of the revocation of the visa for which he had applied. That restriction brought to the fore Valirakis' old hostility against the United States government, which in the decade of the 1980s had theorized him to be the "founder" of the Revolutionary Organization 17 November.

He was married to the noted painter Mina Papatheodorou-Valiraki, who has earned many international accolades for her works. The couple had two children.

=== Death ===
On the morning of 24 January 2021, Valirakis went alone on a small boat trip on the coast of Eretria, Euboea, Greece. At about 12:00 local time, his wife tried to contact him but there was no signal. After trying again, with no results, she alerted police and coast guards that her husband was not traceable. His boat was then found near the scene, with the engine running. Valiraki's body was later found on the evening of the same day, and was declared dead at the scene. He had drowned. He was 77.
