= Teleidae =

Coordinates: 38°34′58″N 24°07′55″E

Teleidae or Teleidai (Ancient Greek: Τηλειδαί), also appearing as Teleidon (Τηλειδῶν), was a town in ancient Euboea. It was a deme of Eretria. It is located near modern Paralia Oxylithou.
