= Achaeus of Eretria =

5th-century BC Greek playwright

Achaeus of Eretria (Ancient Greek: Ἀχαιός ὁ Ἐρετριεύς; born 484 BC in Euboea) was a Greek playwright and author of tragedies and satyr plays. He is variously said to have written 24, 30, or 44 plays, of which 19 titles are known: Adrastus, Aethon, Alcmeon, Alphesiboea, Athla, Azanes, Cycnus, Eumenides, Hephaestus, Iris, Linus, Moirai (Fates), Momus, Oedipus, Omphale, Philoctetes, Phrixus, Pirithous, and Theseus. Achaeus of Eretria was regarded in antiquity as being the second greatest writer of satyr plays, after Aeschylus.

Achaeus' first play was produced in 447 BC and won a prize. A quote in Aristophanes' The Frogs suggests he was dead by around 405 BC. Some classicists suggest that the fact that he only won a single prize was due to his non-Athenian birth, as the men of Athens were loath to honour any but their own fellow-citizens.

Achaeus of Eretria belongs to the classic age, but is not recognized as a classic writer. His satyric plays were much admired for their spirited style, albeit somewhat laboured and lacking in clarity. The philosopher Menedemus thought his plays second only to Aeschylus, he was part of the Alexandrian canon, and Didymus wrote a commentary on him. Athenaeus (10.451c) describes him as having a lucid style, but with tendencies to obscurity. Athenaeus also claimed that Euripides took a line from Achaeus, while Aristophanes quotes him twice, in The Frogs and The Wasps.

His work survives only in fragments, as well as the titles of seven satyr plays and eleven tragedies, which are as follows:

== Tragedies ==
- Adrastos (Ἀδράστος)
- Azanes (Ἀζάνες)
- Athla (Ἆθλα)
- Alphesiboia (Ἀλφεσίβοια)
- Eumenides (Εὐμενίδης)
- Theseus (Θησεύς)
- Kyknos (Κύκνος)
- Momos (Μώμος)
- Oedipus (Οἰδίπους)
- Peirithous (Πειρίθους)
- Philoctetes in Troy (Φιλοκτήτης ἐν Τροίαι)
- Phrixos (Φρίξος)

== Satyr Plays ==
- Aithon (Αἴθων)
- Alkmaion (Ἀλκμαίων)
- Hephaestus (Ἥφαιστος)
- Iris (Ἴρις)
- Linos (Λινός)
- Moirai (Μοῖραι)
- Omphale (Ὀμφάλη)
