= Gloria Porcella =

Italian curator and writer

Gloria Porcella is a curator, writer, and art critic.

== Biography ==
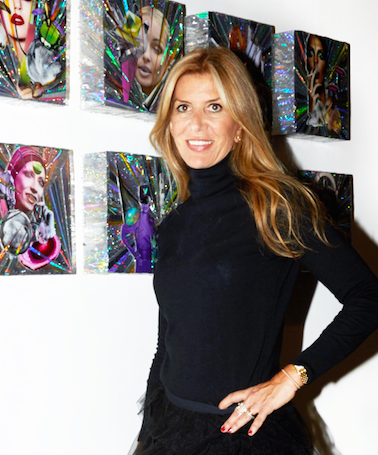
Gloria Porcella standing in front of Andrea Stanislav's work at Galleria Ca' d'Oro.

Porcella was born and raised in Rome and attended San Diego State University and University of California San Diego. Her great-grandfather, Alpinolo Porcella, was a curator and a friend of Italian artists Filippo de Pisis and Giorgio de Chirico. Her grandfather, Amadore Porcella, was a writer for the Vatican's newspaper L’Osservatore Romano. He also founded Galleria San Bernardo in 1945 at the Piazza San Bernardo. In 1970, Porcella's father, Antonio Porcella, established Galleria Ca’ d’Oro first on Via Condotti, and then moved it to the Piazza di Spagna. Galleria Ca’ d’Oro is now located on Via Del Babuino. In 1990 he helped to launch La Fondazione Giorgio e Isa de Chirico.

Following university, Gloria Porcella interned for Sotheby's on New Bond street in London from 1995 to 1997 in the Impressionist and Modern Art Department. In 1997, she returned to Rome to stage her first exhibition at Galleria Ca’ d’Oro. She also served as a Councilor of Cultural Commission, Head of the Cultural Center in Rome, and as an advisor to the Ministry of the Environment in Italy. Porcella has staged exhibitions at the European Parliament of Brussels for Italian artist Giorgio de Chirico and is the European curator for American artist Seward Johnson.

Porcella expanded Galleria Ca’ d’Oro to Miami in 2010, where she began curating exhibitions linking Italian art with the United States. In 2014 she opened a gallery in New York City in Chelsea in 2014. She works in public art projects around the world and has staged shows in Berlin, Gstaad, Hannover, Milan, Monte Carlo, Palermo, Rome, Sardinia, Siracusa, and Turin.

== Curatorial work ==
In 2003, Porcella curated Madonna in Contemporary Art, an exhibition honoring the 25th anniversary of Pope John Paul II's papacy. The exhibit was shown at the European Parliament in Brussels, and then at the Pantheon in Rome.

In 2011 Porcella orchestrated "Mona Lisa Unveiled" at Miami's Freedom Tower. The exhibition included 16th-19th century works and a variety of 20th century reinterpretations of Leonardo da Vinci's Mona Lisa, including works by Salvador Dalí, Marcel Duchamp, and Brazilian Neo-pop artist Romero Britto.

In alliance with Cracking Art Group, Porcella coordinated the REGeneration Art Project which featured a set of recycled plastic animals first exhibited in 2009 at the G8 Summit in Italy. The project was then displayed at the 2010 Art Basel Miami Beach, and at the 2011 Venice Biennale. In 2013 the REGeneration Art Project was shown in Central Park celebrating the Year of Italian Culture in the United States, and in 2014 the exhibit was again shown in Columbus Circle.

In partnership with Lamberto Petracca, the Dante Alighieri Society, and her father, Antonio Porcella, Porcella curated "Omaggio a de Chirico" in 2010 in New York, Los Angeles, and Miami with sponsorships from the UN. The exhibition featured a collection of de Chirico reinterpretations by 67 contemporary artists.
