= Cracking Art =

Art movement

Cracking Art is an art movement created by an Italian artist collective, and known for urban installations characterized by the presence of giant animals made of recyclable and colored plastic.

== History ==
The Cracking Art movement was born in 1993 in Biella. It was founded by Omar Ronda, Alex Angi, Renzo Nucara, Carlo Rizzetti, Marco Veronese and Vittorio Valente, who left the group almost immediately and was replaced by Kicco. In 2000 Alessandro Pianca was the first new addition to the group. In 2003 they were joined by William Sweetlove. In 2008, Omar Ronda left the project in order to start a solo career.

The Cracking Art movement is currently formed by five artists: Alex Angi, Renzo Nucara, Marco Veronese, William Sweetlove and Kicco. The common objective is to make art through a strong social and environmental commitment that, combined with an innovative use of plastic materials, evokes the close relationship between natural and artificial realities.

== Philosophy ==
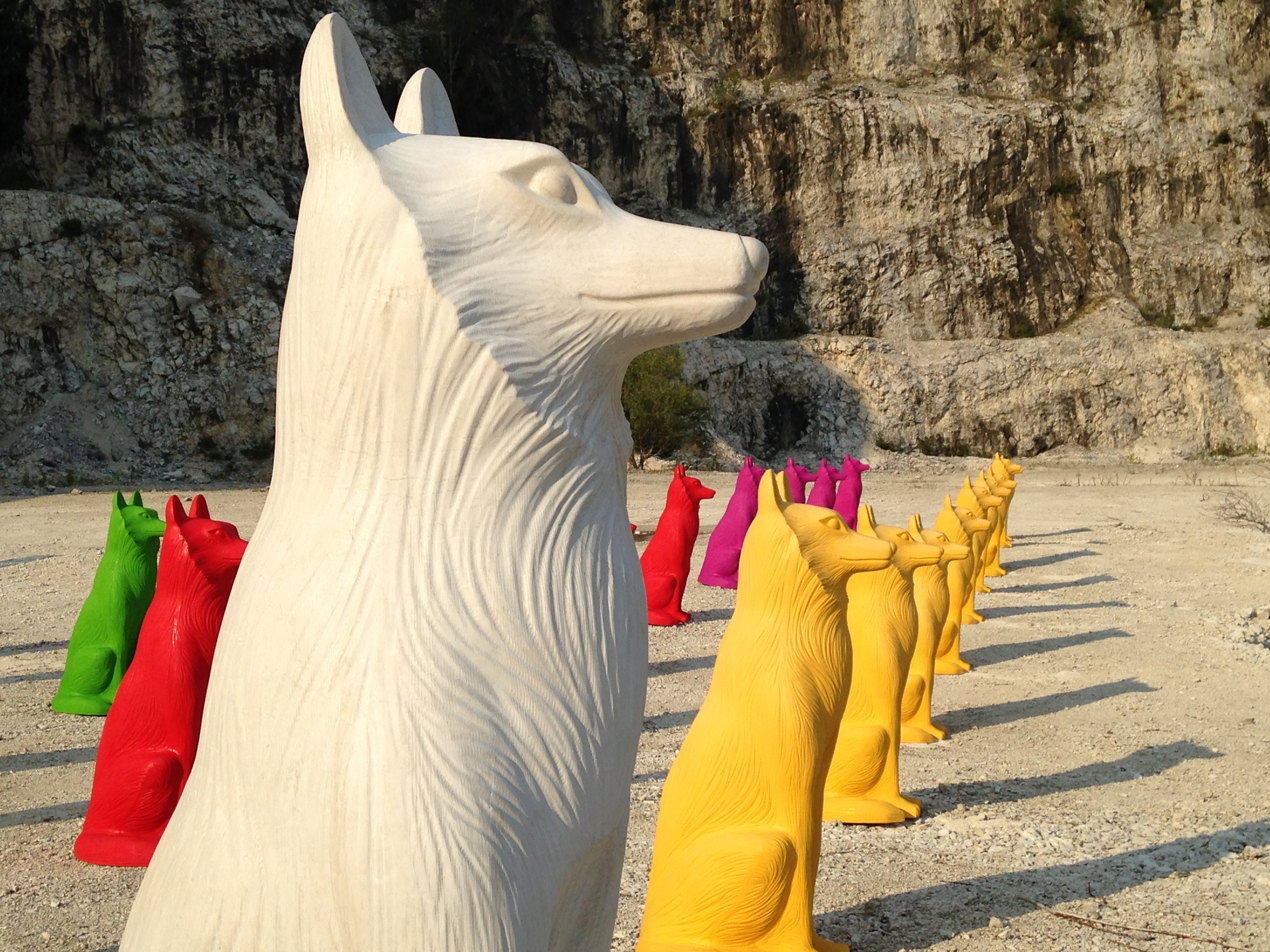
Installation in Rezzato, Italy.

The name "Cracking Art" comes from the verb "to crack" which indicates the state of being split, broken, crashed. Moreover, the catalytic cracking is the name that stands for the chemical reaction occurring when the raw crude oil is converted into plastic. This is the reason why for the movement "cracking" represents the moment when something natural becomes artificial, the most important instant that for the artists of the movement should be represented through art.

1. Cracking is the process that transforms petroleum into virgin naphtha, a material used for creating many products of synthesis as plastic.
2. Cracking is the gap of the contemporary man who struggles between his primary naturalness and a future that becomes more and more artificial.
3. Plastic finds its roots in a millenary tradition of civilization, in a huge and deep cultural evolution that link together the human being, the artificial creations and the environmental nature. In a certain sense Cracking could be considered as a conceptual formula used to challenge the rules of contemporary art.
4. Cracking is the process that transforms natural into artificial, organic into synthetic. It is the process that puts us all in front of new realities.

=== The concept of regeneration ===
The concept of regeneration enlivens the artistic history of the movement since its origins. The plastic, chosen material of the movement, has the eternal property of being crushed and reshaped into other sculptures. The artworks are designed to inspire sensibility in recycling plastic for the environment while leaving a significant artistic value to the world we live in. Recycling plastic means to subtract toxic destruction which devastates nature, as well as creating plastic artworks means to communicate through a universal language while paying strong attention to the planet.

The aim is to connect common reasoning to individual meditation, creating installations with animals that appear unexpectedly in everyday places. The astonishment of meeting an ordinary subject transformed into something extraordinary through its super size, color and shape catches people attention and invites them to see urban life and cities in a different way.

== Major installations ==
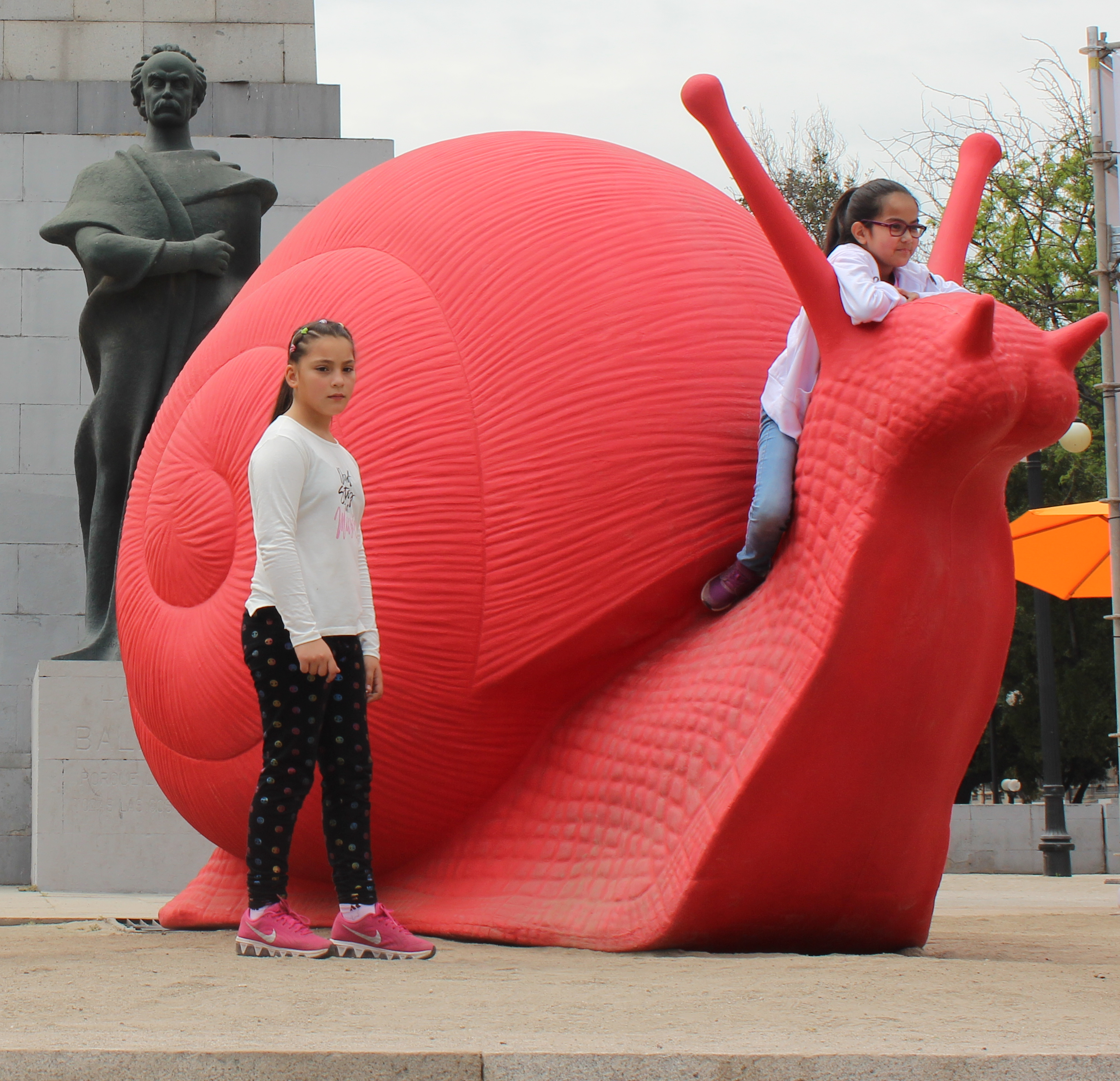
Snails in Santiago

- "Regeneration Cleveland", urban installation in Cleveland, Ohio, 2016
- "Regeneration Reggia", installation at Palace of Caserta, 2016
- "Regeneration Siena", urban installation in Siena, 2015
- "Swallow Nest", installation at Sforza Castle, Milan, 2014
- "Regeneration Art Project", installation at Central Park and Columbus Circle New York City, 2013
- "SOS World", installation at Venice Biennale, 2001
- "1000 dolphins in Milan", installation at Royal Palace of Milan, 1996

== Bibliography ==
- Massimiliano Finazzer Flory, Damian Sausset, Partrick Alton, Treviso 2010 - Cracking Art - Regeneration, Consorzio Per Mio Figlio, Treviso, 2010
- Philippe Daverio, Domenico Pertocoli, Arte stupefacente: da dada al cracking art, Edizioni Gabriele Mazzotta, Milan, 2004
- Maurizio Sciaccalunga, Alessandro Riva, Cracking Art: S.O.S World, Electa, Milan, 2001
- Gianni Pozzi, Cracking Art. Natural/Artificial, Edizioni Gabriele Mazzotta, Milan, 1999
- Gianni Pozzi, Epocale: Pop Art, Graffiti Art, Cracking Art, Edizioni Gabriele Mazzotta, Milan, 1998
- Luca Beatrice, Tommaso Trini, Cracking Art, Adriano Parise, Rome, 1993
