= Swiss School of Archaeology in Greece =

Archaeological institute operating in Athens, Greece

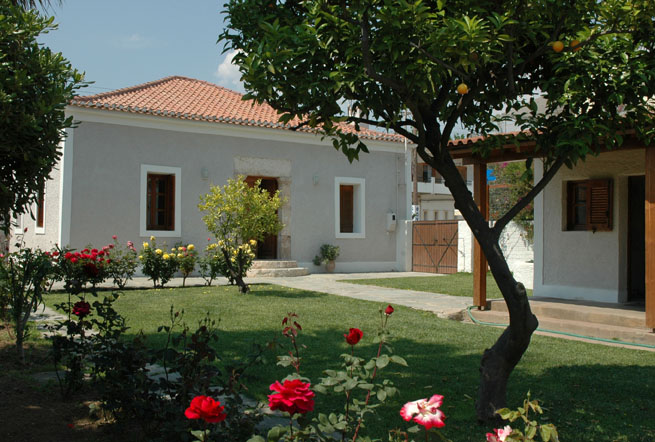
The Swiss School house at Eretria

The Swiss School of Archaeology in Greece (ESAG) (French: École Suisse d'Archéologie en Grèce; German: Schweizer Archäologische Schule in Griechenland; Italian: Scuola Elvetica d'Archeologia in Grecia; Greek: Ελβετική Αρχαιολογική Σχολή στην Ελλάδα) is one of the foreign archaeological institutes operating in Greece. Since 1964, the Swiss archaeologists have been excavating the remains of the ancient site of Eretria (Euboea), a medium-sized city which has extensively contributed to the development and the influence of the Greek civilisation. Hosted in Switzerland by the University of Lausanne, the Swiss School has its head office in Athens, in an Art Nouveau building at Odos Skaramanga 4B. The school has also offices in a 19th-century neoclassical house in Eretria, Odos Apostoli 15.

== History ==
Swiss archaeologists started to work in Euboea in April 1964, but the Greek Archaeological Council had already accepted the principle of Swiss participation in the excavation and study of the ruins of Eretria in 1962. Vasilis Petrakos, who was then the epimelete in charge of Eretria, had drawn the attention of the Greek archaeological authorities to the threat to Eretria's ancient remains posed by the development of the small modern town. In fact, no other foreign archaeological team had been involved in studying the site since 1895, when the American School of Classical Studies at Athens completed its work. In 1975, after the end of the rule of the military junta (1967–1974), the Swiss Mission requested and received the title, habitual in Greece, of "School of Archaeology". The activities of the Swiss School of Archaeology in Greece in Eretria are multiple: they include the exploration of the city's past by the excavation of its ruins, the study of the material discovered, the publication of research, the preservation of archaeological remains in the field and in the Museum, and their development and presentation to the public.

== A few milestones ==
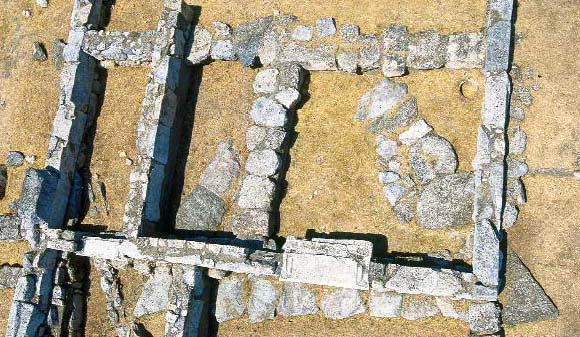
The geometric Heroon

The forty years of Swiss archaeological excavations in Eretria (1964–2004) can be divided into three phases. The first phase, which extends from the beginning until 1982, is that of the great discoveries: the rich necropolis from the Geometric Period (Heroon), the structures predating the temple of Apollo Daphnephoros uncovered under the foundations of the 6th century BC temple, and the sumptuous dwellings of the Classical-Hellenistic Period, including the House of the Mosaics. The second phase, from 1982 to 1995, is that of consolidation, research on the material excavated, and finally a more moderate extension of the terrain (the West Quarter, the North Gymnasium, the acropolis, the Sacrificial area north of the Sanctuary of Apollo). The third phase (1996–2009) is marked by a new spurt of excavation activity with the exploration of a sector located not far from the House of the Mosaics, which led to the discovery of the Industrial Quarter as well as remains going back to the second millennium BC.

== Funding research ==
During the first eighteen years of its existence (1964–1982), the Swiss School of Archaeology in Greece, relied on the Swiss National Science Foundation (SNF) as the sole source of financial support for its activities. Created in 1983, the "Foundation of the Swiss School of Archaeology in Greece" assumed responsibility for high-level administration and for seeking indispensable financial income from various donors: patrons, foundations, industries and companies, Swiss universities, and the Swiss Academy of Human and Social Sciences (SAGW). The University of Lausanne (UNIL), which has served as the Foundation's headquarters in Switzerland since 1982, plays a crucial role in its organization.

== Research and training ==
Thanks to the excavations it has conducted and the research it has organized -from the study of the data gathered in the field to their publication- the Swiss School of Archaeology in Greece provides a valuable framework for cultural exchange: many professors, doctoral candidates, advanced students, and interns from Swiss universities have in fact taken part in the activities of the School and in the study of Eretria's past. It is clear that much remains to be discovered. Only a tiny part of ancient Eretria has been excavated, while the materials deposited in the Museum and the documentation of older excavations have not yet yielded all the information they hold. In the years to come, we hope to learn more about the beginnings of the city and about the occupation of the territory, to cite only a few of the research projects underway. All the projects are subject to the authorization of the Greek government's Ministry of Culture, and the provision of advance notice to the Ephorate of Euboean Antiquities, which is also responsible for overseeing the activities.

== Restoration, preservation, and publications ==
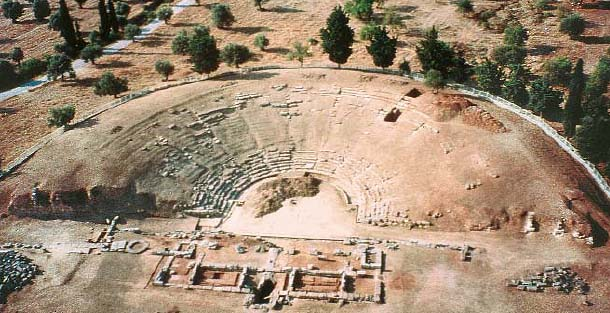
The theater

The School has conceived, financed and carried out the expansion of the archaeological Museum, as well as the construction of a pavilion to protect and display the mosaics of the House of the Mosaics (1987–1991). It preserves and maintains the archaeological remains it excavates. It has proposed various projects for the preservation and presentation of the Theater. The results of its investigations are published annually in the Swiss journal Antike Kunst and summaries appear in the series Eretria, Excavations and Researches (20 volumes published to date). Eretria has continued to provide numerous subjects for articles, books and university dissertations.

== Archaeology and modern urban development ==
From the outset, the School has taken an interest in the origins of the modern town of Eretria. In 1974‒75, a team from the Swiss Federal Institute of Technology Zurich drew up a map showing numerous 19th-century houses and proposed that they be preserved. A project was submitted to municipal and governmental authorities, and then presented in two exhibitions, one in Eretria, the other in Athens. The creation of an archaeological zone in the region between the Temple of Apollo Daphnephoros and the House of the Mosaics, which constituted an important part of the 1975 project, has sporadically inspired interest. In 1998, the Swiss School gave a new impulse to studies on modern and contemporary Eretria that led to the publication of a book. In terms of specific accomplishments, the School has restored a 19th-century house that belonged to Admiral Nikodimos, one of the heroes of the Greek War of Independence, and also established its headquarters in Eretria.

== Publications ==
- I Paul Auberson, Temple d'Apollon Daphnéphoros. Architecture.

- II Ingrid R. Metzger, Die hellenistische Keramik in Eretria.

- III Claude Bérard, L'Hérôon à la Porte de l'Ouest.

- IV Clemens Krause, Das Westtor. Ergebnisse der Ausgrabungen 1964-1968.

- V André Hurst, Jean-Paul Descoeudres, Paul Auberson, Ombres de l'Eubée?; Die vorklassische Keramik aus dem Gebiet des Westtores; Le temple de Dionysos.

- VI Jean-Paul Descoeudres, Christiane Dunant, Ingrid R. Metzger, Claude Bérard, Euboeans in Australia; Stèles funéraires; Gefässe mit Palmetten-Lotus Dekor; Die Funde aus den Pyrai; Topographie et urbanisme de l'Erétrie archaïque: l'Hérôon.

- VII Ingrid R. Metzger, Das Thesmophorion von Eretria. Funde und Befunde eines Heiligtums.

- VIII Pierre Ducrey, Ingrid R. Metzger, Karl Reber, Le Quartier de la Maison aux mosaïques.

- IX Kristine Gex, Rotfigurige und weissgrundige Keramik.

- X Karl Reber, Die klassischen und hellenistischen Wohnhäuser im Westquartier.

- XI Denis Knoepfler, Décrets érétriens de proxénie et de citoyenneté.

- XII Nina Mekacher, Marek Palaczyk, Matrizengeformte hellenistische Terrakotten; Esther Schönenberger, Amphorenstempel. Grabungen 1964-2001.

- XIII Elena Mango, Das Gymnasion.

- XIV Sandrine Huber, L'Aire sacrificielle au nord du Sanctuaire d'Apollon Daphnéphoros. Un rituel des époques géométrique et archaïque.

- XV Ferdinand Pajor, Eretria - Nea Psara. Eine klassizistische Stadtanlage über der antiken Polis.

- XVI Stephan G. Schmid, Boire pour Apollon. Céramique hellénistique et banquets dans le Sanctuaire d'Apollon Daphnéphoros.

- XVII Béatrice Blandin, Les pratiques funéraires d'époque géométrique à Erétrie. Espace des vivants, demeures des morts.

- XVIII Hans Peter Isler, with a contribution by Elisa Ferroni, Das Theater.

- XIX Caroline Huguenot, La Tombe aux Erotes et la Tombe d'Amarynthos. Architecture funéraire et présence macédonienne en Grèce centrale.

- XX Samuel Verdan, Anne Kenzelmann Pfyffer, Claude Léderrey, Céramique géométrique d'Erétrie.

- XXI Sylvian Fachard, La défense du territoire. Etude de la chôra érétrienne et de ses fortifications.

- XXII Samuel Verdan, Le Sanctuaire d’Apollon Daphnéphoros à l’époque géométrique.

- Eretria. A Guide to the Ancient City.

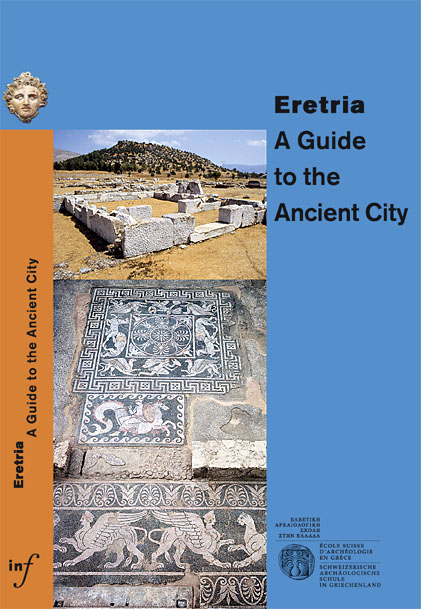
Eretria. A guide to the ancient city

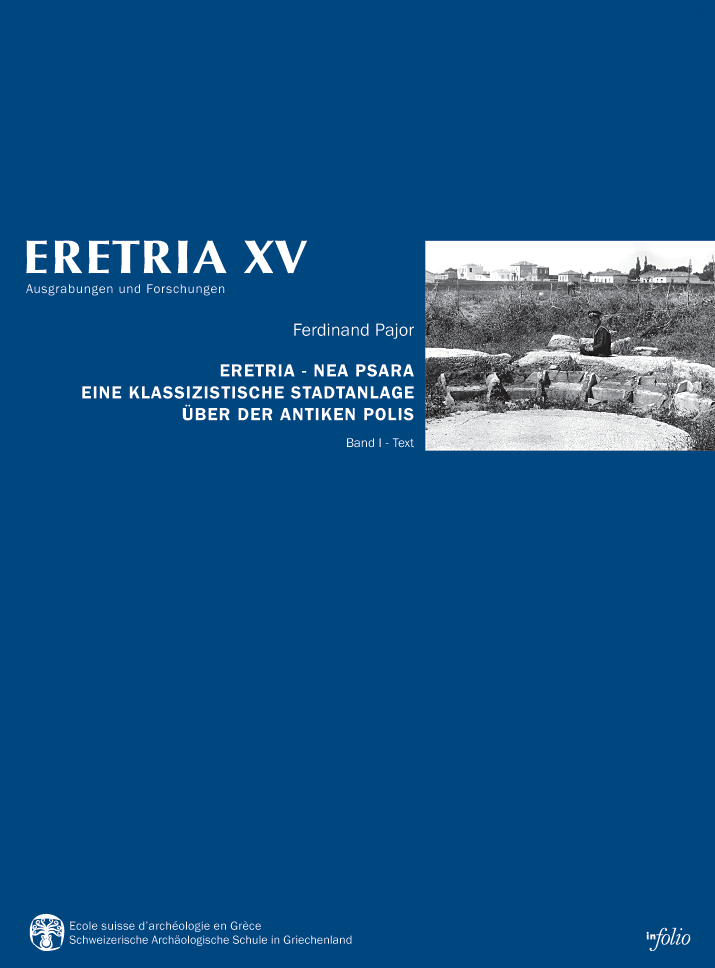
Eretria XV

== Bibliography ==
- E. Korka et al. (eds.): Foreign Archaeological Schools in Greece, 160 Years, Athens, Hellenic Ministry of Culture, 2006, p. 96-101.
