= Eretria =

Town in Euboea, Greece

Eretria Ερέτρια
- Municipality
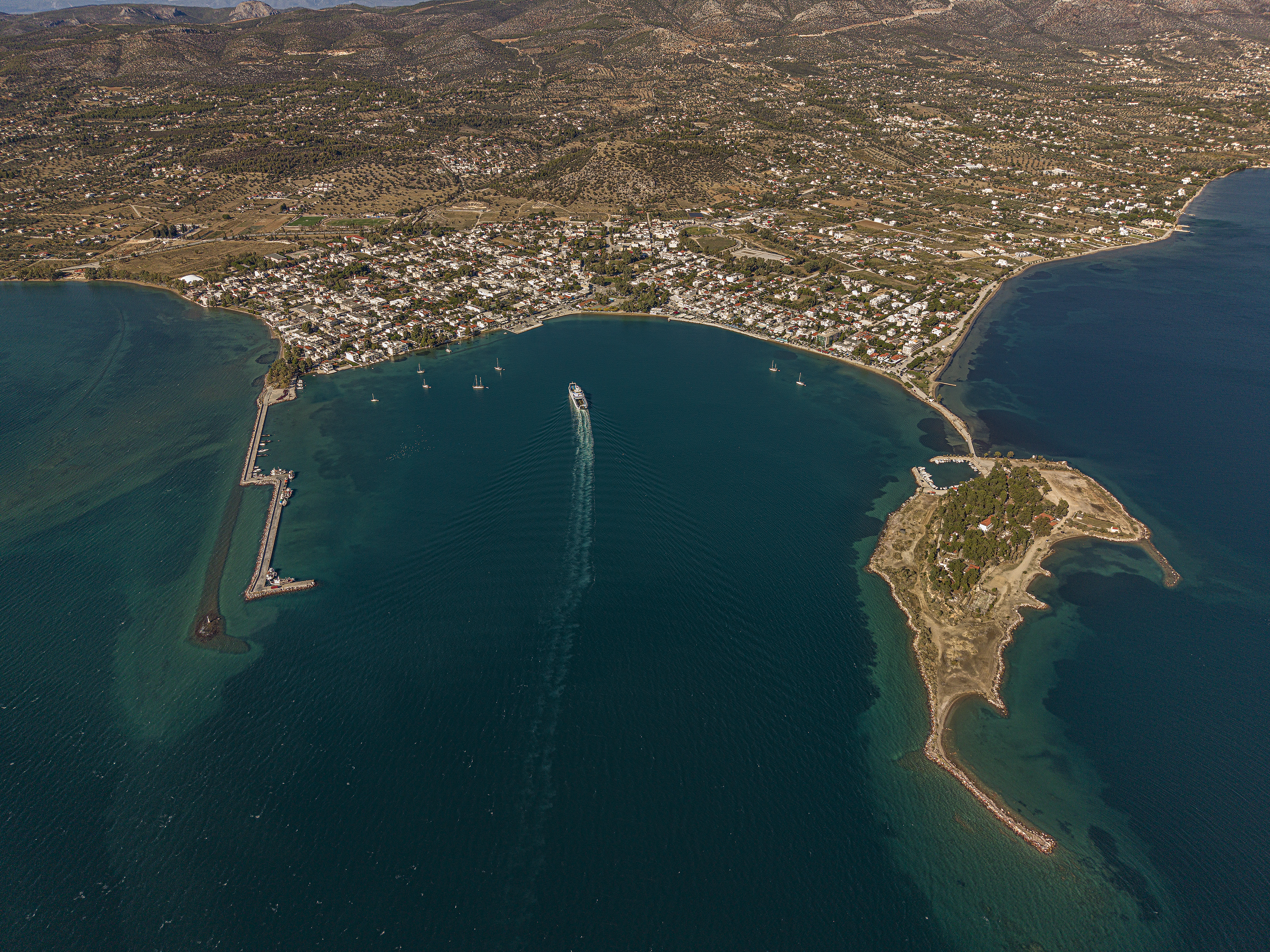
- Aerial view of Eretria.

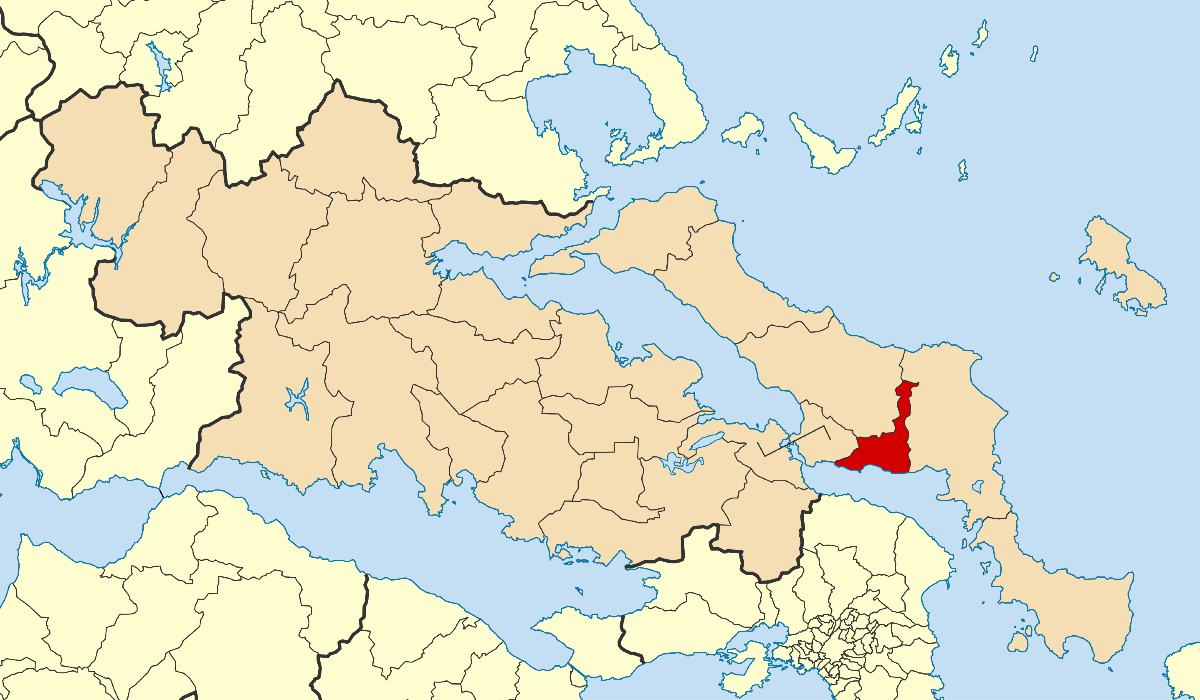

- Location within Greece
- Coordinates: 38°23′53″N 23°47′26″E
- Country: Greece
- Administrative region: Central Greece
- Regional unit: Euboea

Area
  - Municipality: 168.56 km^{2} (65.08 sq mi)
  - Municipal unit: 58.65 km^{2} (22.64 sq mi)
- Elevation: 8 m (26 ft)

Population (2021)
  - Municipality: 10,652
  - Density: 63.194/km^{2} (163.67/sq mi)
  - Municipal unit: 6,567
  - Municipal unit density: 112.0/km^{2} (290.0/sq mi)
- Time zone: UTC+2 (EET)
  - Summer (DST): UTC+3 (EEST)
- Postal code: 340 08
- Area code: 22290
- Vehicle registration: ΧΑ

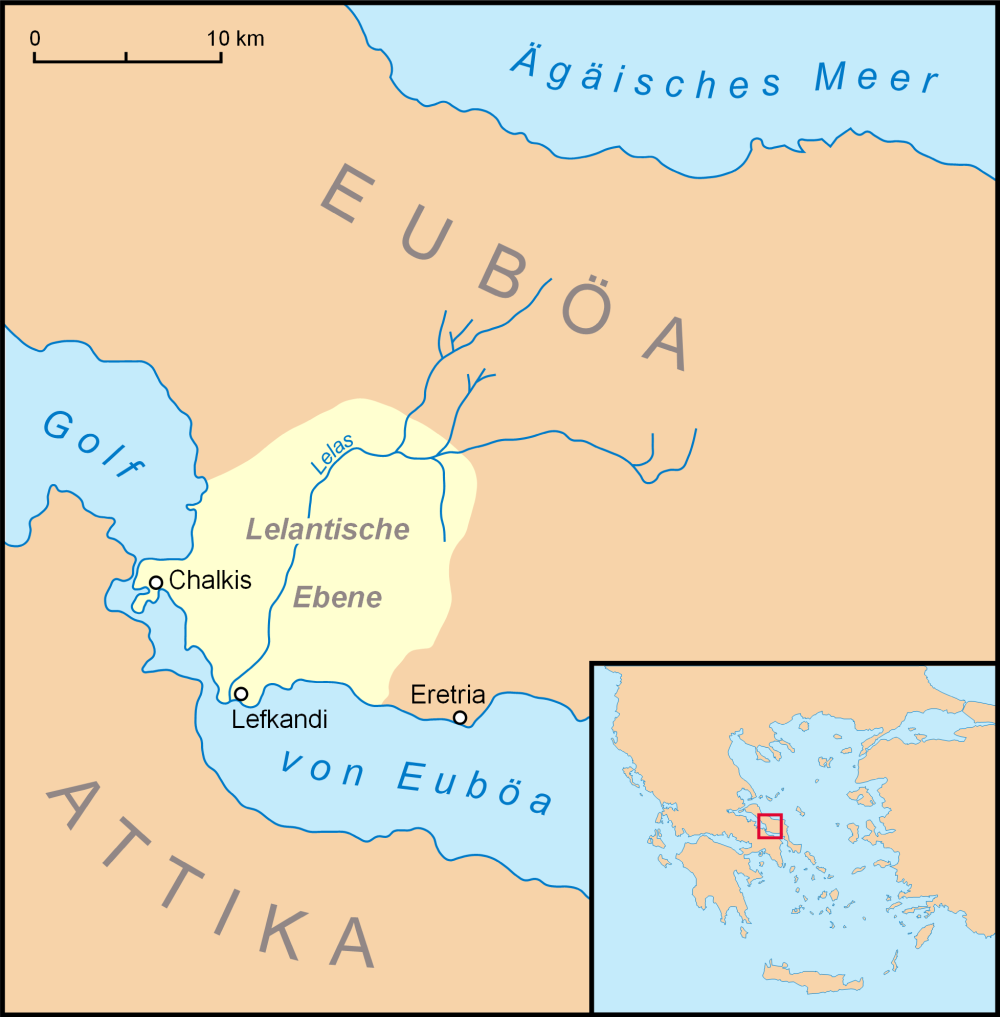
Neighbouring ancient cities

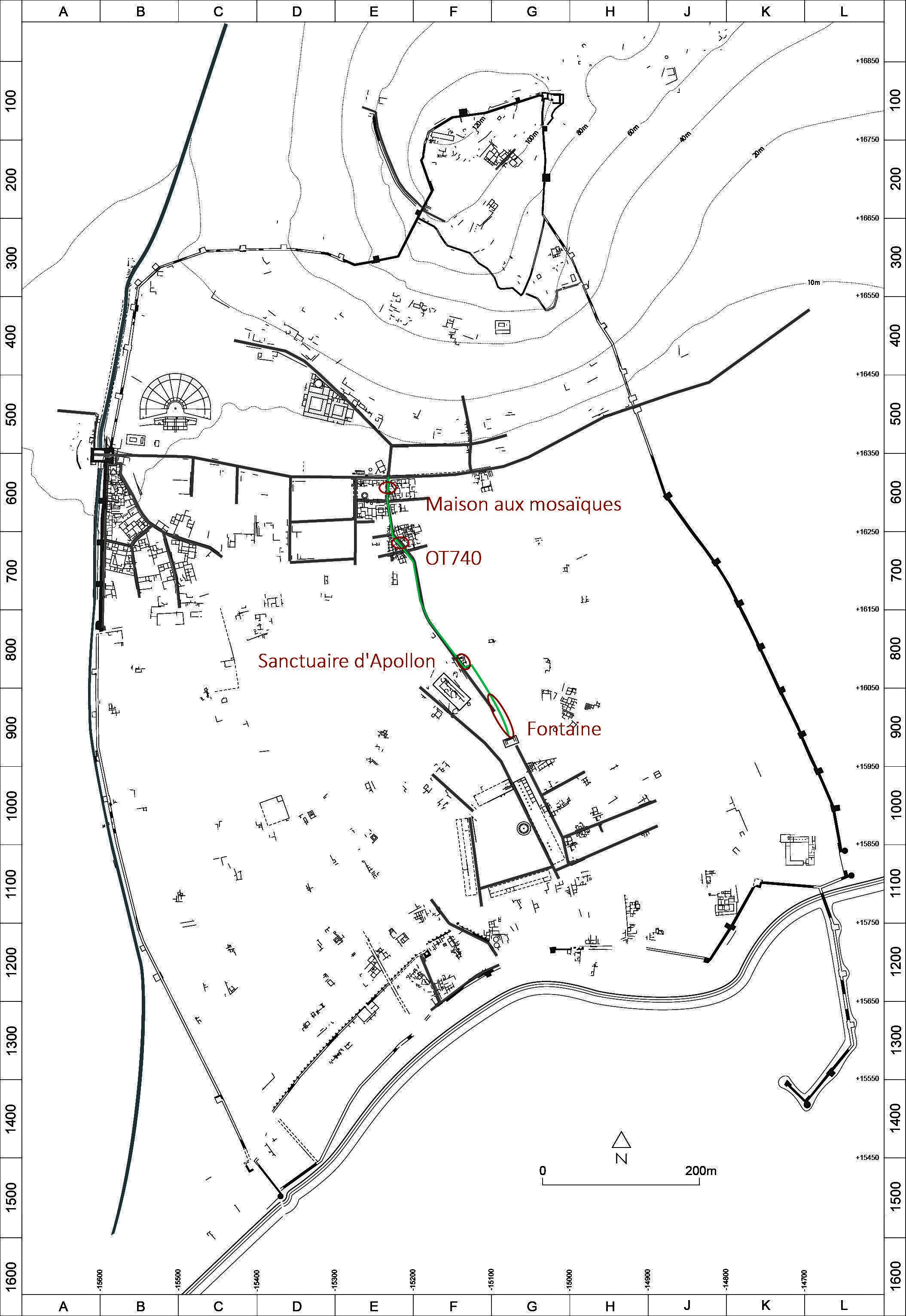
Plan of the site

Eretria (/əˈriːtriə/; Greek: Ερέτρια, Erétria, Ancient Greek: Ἐρέτρια, Erétria, literally 'city of the rowers') is a town in Euboea, Greece, facing the coast of Attica across the narrow South Euboean Gulf. It was an important Greek polis in the 6th and 5th century BC, mentioned by many famous writers and actively involved in significant historical events.

Excavations of the ancient city began in the 1890s and have been conducted since 1964 by the Greek Archaeological Service (11th Ephorate of Antiquities) and the Swiss School of Archaeology in Greece.

== History ==
=== Neolithic Age ===
The first evidence for human activity in the area of Eretria are pottery shards and stone artifacts from the late Neolithic period (3500–3000 BC) found on the Acropolis as well as in the plain. No permanent structures have yet been found. It is therefore unclear whether a permanent settlement existed at that time.

=== Bronze Age ===
The first known settlement from the Early Helladic period (3000–2000 BC) was located on the plain. A granary and several other buildings, as well as a pottery kiln, have been found so far. This settlement was moved to the top of the Acropolis in the Middle Helladic period (2000–1600 BC) because the plain was flooded by the nearby lagoon. In the Late Helladic period (1600–1100 BC), the population dwindled and the remains found so far have been interpreted as an observation post. The site was abandoned during the Greek Dark Ages.

=== Iron Age ===
The oldest archaeological finds date the foundation of the city to the Greek Dark Ages.

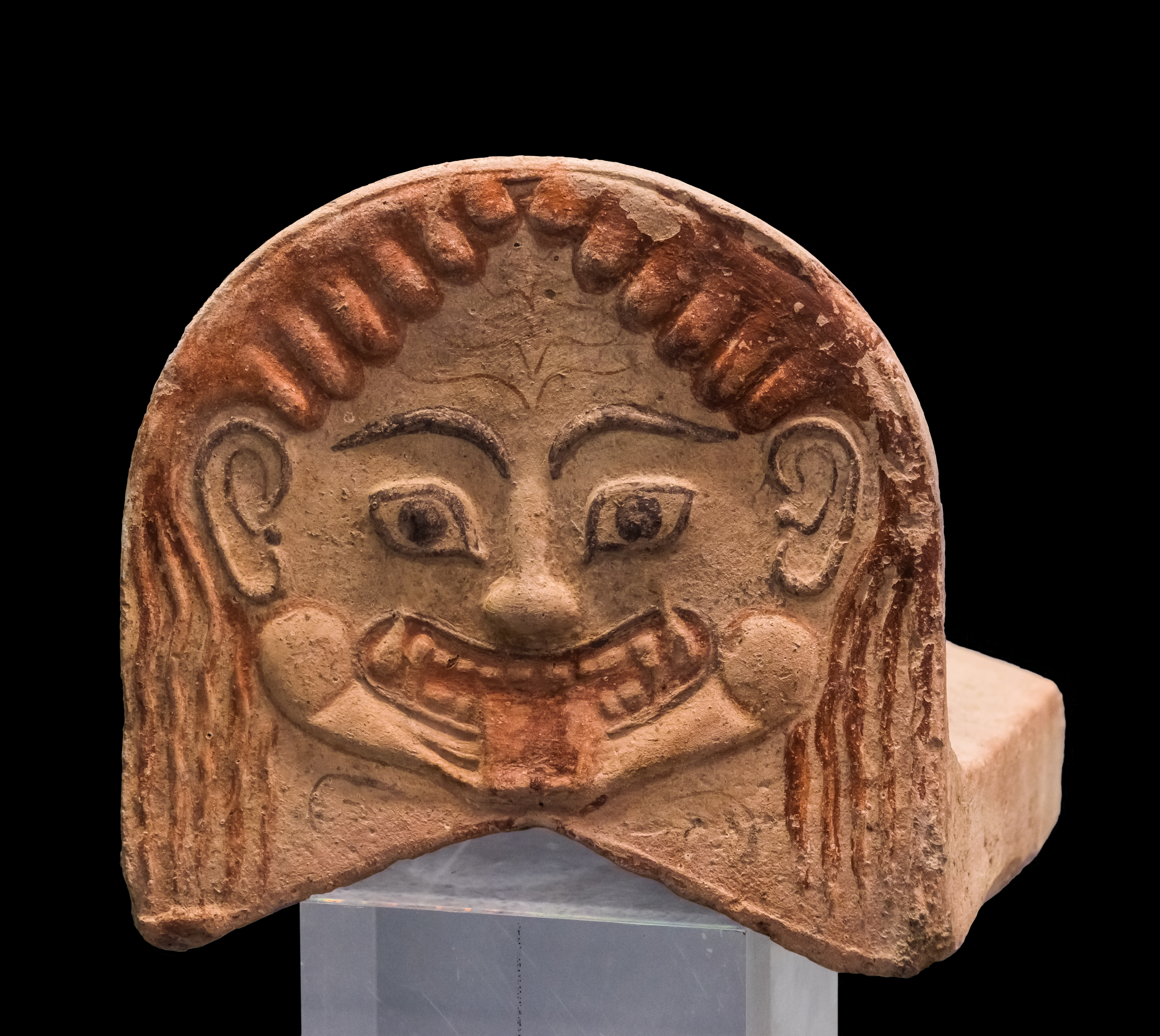
Ancient Greek polychrome antefix, featuring a Gorgona. Archaeological Museum of Eretria

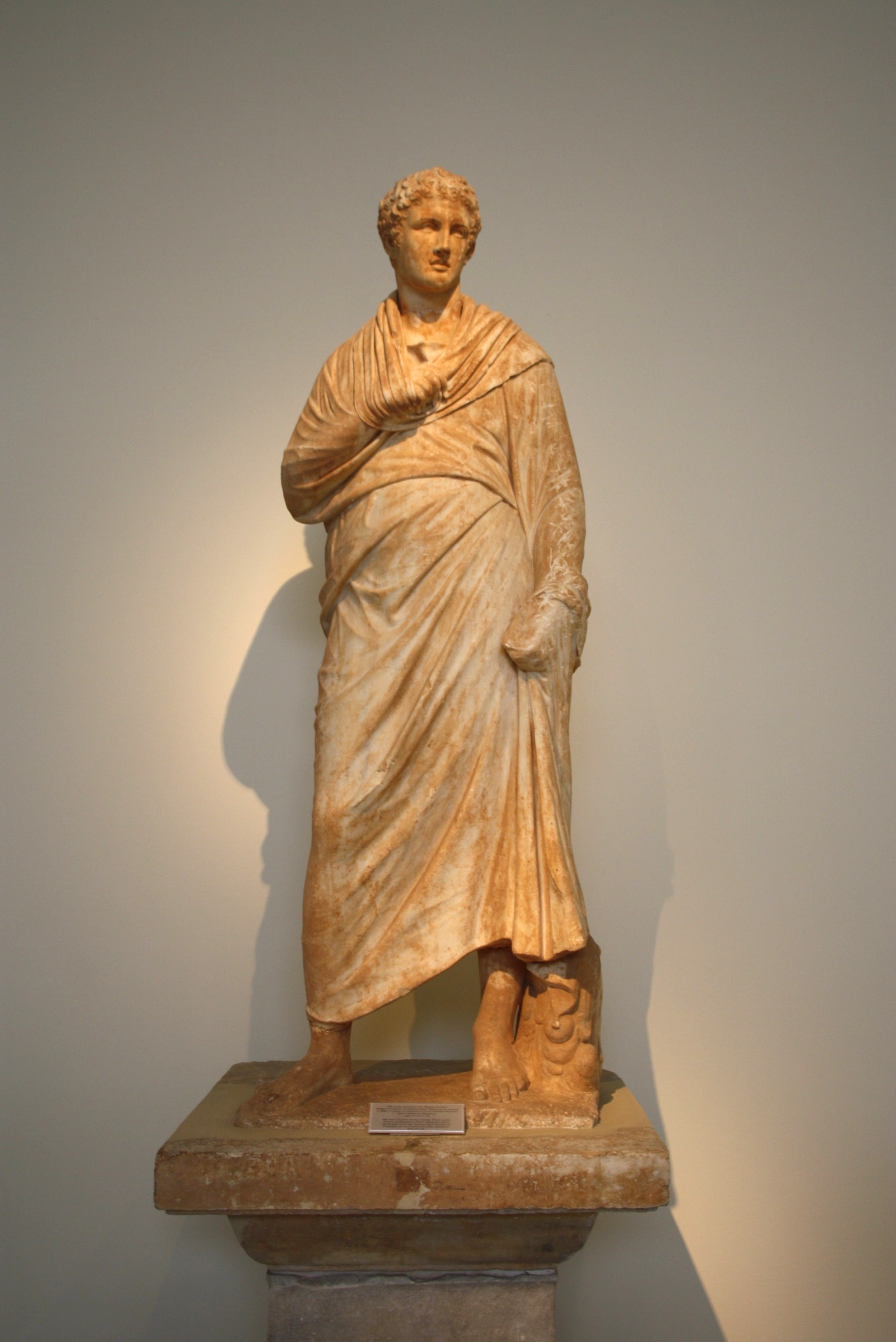
Statue of a youth found in the gymnasium, now in the National Archaeological Museum in Athens

The earliest surviving mention of Eretria was by Homer (Iliad 2.537), who listed Eretria as one of the Greek cities which sent ships to the Trojan War. In the 8th century BC, Eretria and her near neighbour and rival, Chalcis, were both powerful and prosperous trading cities. Eretria controlled the Aegean islands of Andros, Tenos and Ceos. They also held territory in Boeotia on the Greek mainland. Eretria was also involved in the Greek colonisation and founded the colonies of Pithekoussai and Cumae in Italy together with Chalcis.

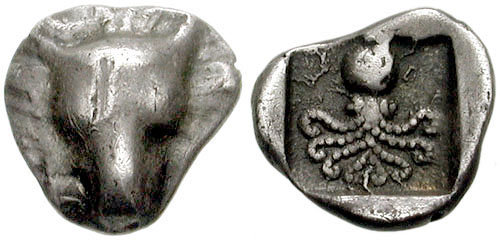
Coin of Eretria, 500–490 BC. Silver obol. Obverse: Facing head of cow. Reverse: Octopus in incuse square.

At the end of the 8th century BC, however, Eretria and Chalcis fought a prolonged war (known mainly from the account in Thucydides as the Lelantine War) for control of the fertile Lelantine plain. Little is known of the details of this war, but it is clear that Eretria was defeated. The city was destroyed and Eretria lost her lands in Boeotia and her Aegean dependencies. Neither Eretria nor Chalcis ever again counted for much in Greek politics. As a result of this defeat, Eretria turned to colonisation. It planted colonies in the northern Aegean, on the coast of Macedon, in Italy, and in Sicily.

=== Classical Age ===
It became an important city in the 6th/5th century BC mentioned by many famous writers and actively involved in significant historical events. The Eretrians were Ionians and were thus natural allies of Athens. When the Ionian Greeks in Asia Minor rebelled against Persia in 499 BC, Eretria joined Athens in sending aid to the rebels, because Miletus had supported Eretria in the Lelantine War. The rebels burned Sardis, but were defeated and the Eretrian general Eualcides was killed. Darius made a point of punishing Eretria during his invasion of Greece. In 490 BC the city was sacked and burned by the Persians under the admiral Datis. In retribution for the stout resistance, the victors killed all the male citizens and deported women and children barefoot to Arderikka in Susiana, Persia, forcing them into slavery. The Persians also destroyed the great temple of Apollo, built around 510 BC; parts of a pediment were found in 1900, including the torso of a statue of Athena.

Eretria was rebuilt shortly afterwards and took part with 600 hoplites in the Battle of Plataea (479 BC). The ancient writer Plutarch mentions a woman of Eretria, "who was kept by Artabanus" at the Persian court of Artaxerxes, who facilitated the audience that Themistocles obtained with the Persian king. During the fifth century BC the whole of Euboea became part of the Delian League, which later became the Athenian Empire. Eretria and other cities of Euboea rebelled unsuccessfully against Athens in 446 BC. During the Peloponnesian War Eretria was an Athenian ally against her Dorian rivals Sparta and Corinth. But soon the Eretrians, along with the rest of the Empire, found Athenian domination oppressive. When the Spartans defeated the Athenians at the Battle of Eretria in 411 BC, the Euboean cities all rebelled.

After her eventual defeat by Sparta in 404 BC, Athens soon recovered and re-established her hegemony over Euboea, which was an essential source of grain for the urban population. The Eretrians rebelled again in 349 BC and this time the Athenians could not recover control. In 343 BC supporters of Philip II of Macedon gained control of the city, but the Athenians under Demosthenes recaptured it in 341 BC.

==== Macedonian period ====
The Battle of Chaeronea in 338 BC, in which Philip defeated the combined armies of the rest of the Greeks, marked the end of the Greek cities as independent states. However, under Macedonian rule Eretria experienced a new period of prosperity which lasted until the 3rd century as attested by many inscriptions, by extensions to the west and south sections of the walls and by many other private and public new buildings including the circus.

From 318 to 312 BC King Cassander lived at Eretria and commissioned the painter Philoxenus of Eretria to paint the battle of Issus, of which the famous Alexander Mosaic in the Naples museum is a copy and the wall paintings in Phillip's tomb at Vergina are connected.

From 304 BC Demetrius I granted the city partial autonomy. During this time the city was governed by Menedemos who founded the Eretrian school of philosophy. After the Chremonidean War (267–262 BC) a permanent Macedonian garrison was installed.

==== Roman period ====
In 198 BC in the Second Macedonian War Eretria was plundered by the Romans. The admiral Lucius Quinctius Flamininus was joined by the allied fleets of Attalus I of Pergamon and of Rhodes, and used them in besieging Eretria. He eventually took the town during a night-time assault during which the citizens surrendered. Flamininus came away with a large collection of art works as his share of the booty.

Eretria became an object of contention between the Romans and Macedonians, but was given partial independence and experienced a new period of prosperity. Under the Romans, athletic contests for children and youths called the Romaia were held.

In 87 BC it was finally destroyed in the First Mithridatic War and gradually declined further.

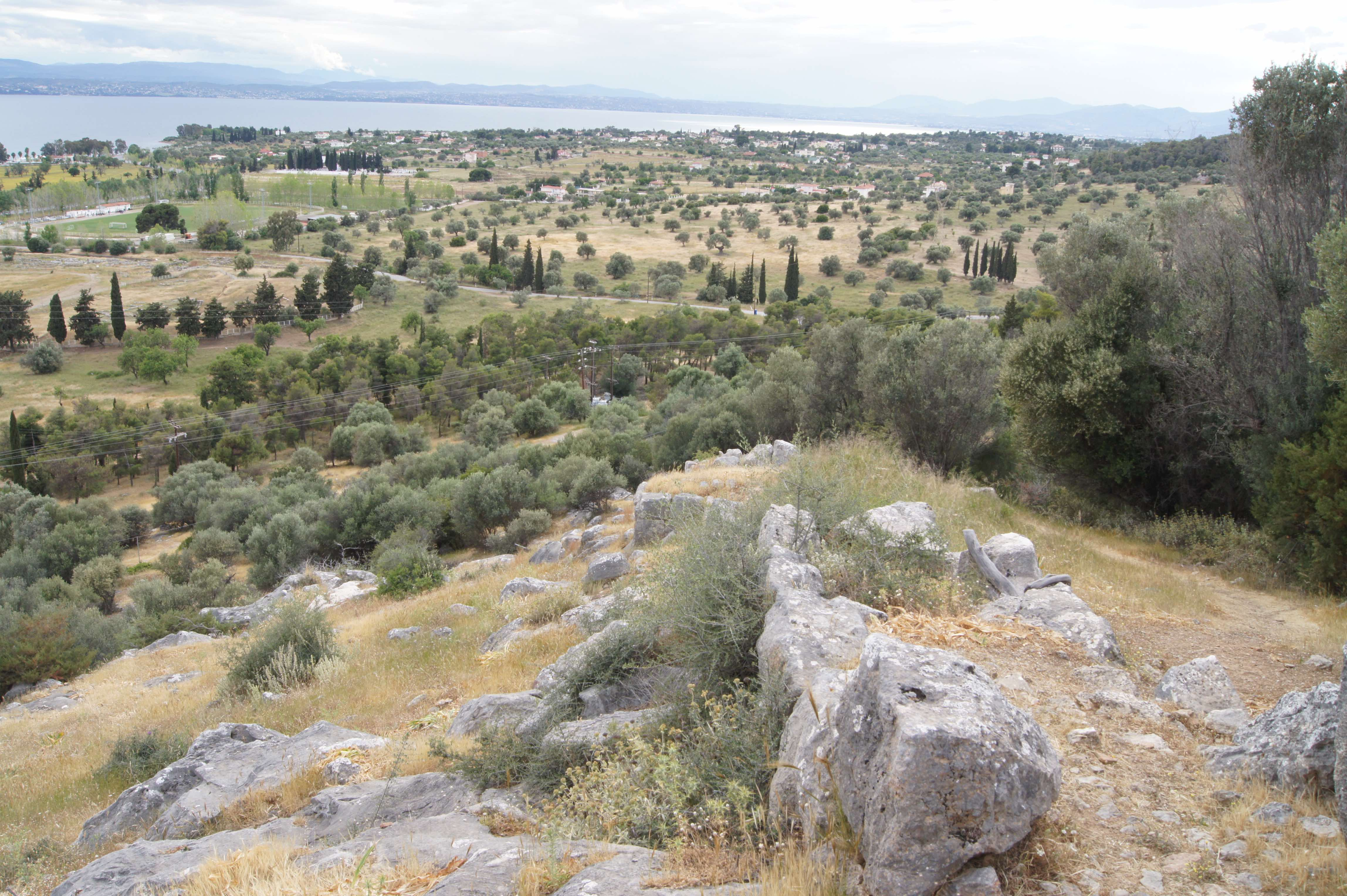
Ancient polygonal city walls on the acropolis

== Site monuments ==
Many remains of the ancient city can be seen today including:

- Parts of the city walls and gates (of 4 km length)
- The Theatre
- Palaces I and II
- Upper and Lower Gymnasiums
- House of the mosaics
- The Baths
- Temple of Apollo Daphnephoros
- Temple of Artemis
- Temple of Isis
- Temple of Dionysos
- The Acropolis
- Macedonian tomb

=== Temple of Apollo Daphnephoros ===
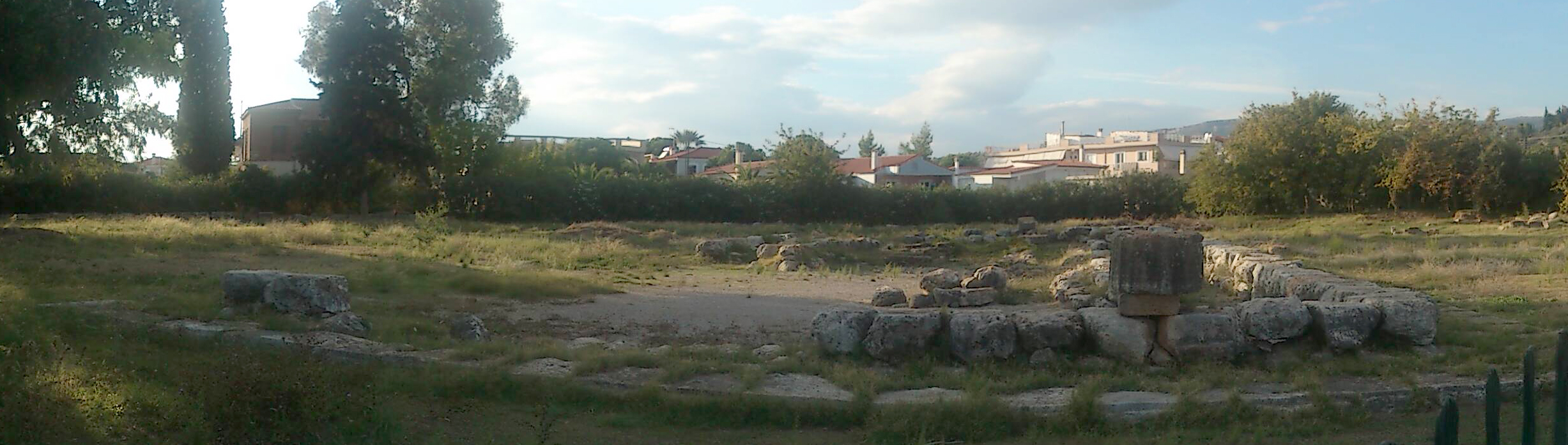
Temple of Apollo Daphnephoros

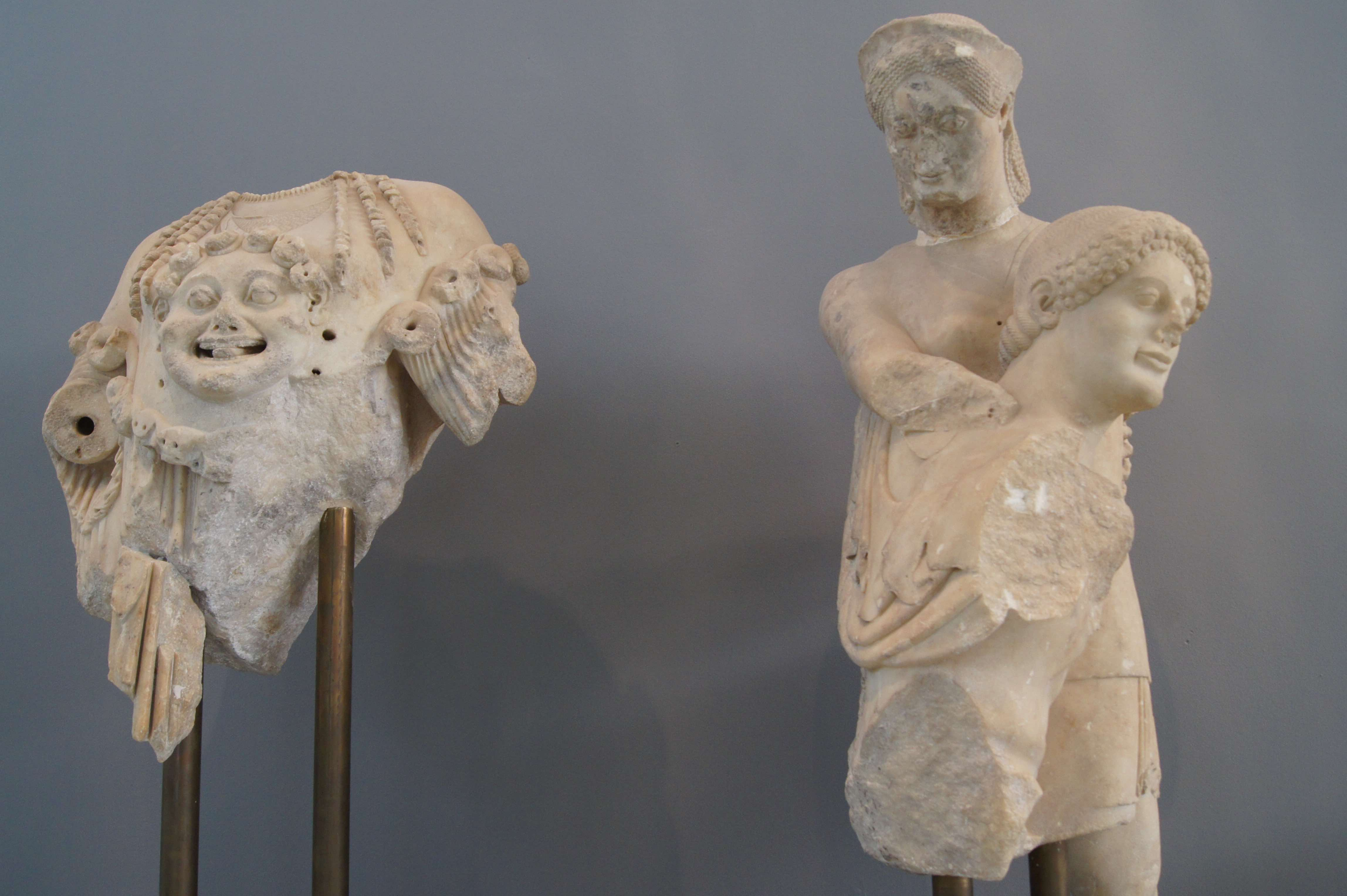
Temple of Apollo pediment sculptures

The temple of Apollo Daphnephoros is the most important and wider known monument of Eretria, featuring sparkling and sharp sculptures on the pediments, their postures well in advance of experiments in Athens of the time. Together with its enclosure it constituted the sacred temenos of Apollo, a religious centre and fundamental place of worship within the core of the ancient city, to the north of the Agora.

According to the Homeric hymn to Apollo, when the god was seeking for a location to found its oracle, he arrived to the Lelantine plain. The first temple is dated to the Geometric period and was situated probably near the harbour, as the sea then reached the area of the Agora. The hecatompedon (hundred-footer) apsidal edifice is the earliest in its type among those mentioned by Homer, and slightly after the hecatompedon temple of Hera on the island of Samos. It was flanked to the south by another apsidal building which also came to light: the so-called Daphniforio or "space with laurels" (7.5 x 11.5m) is the most ancient edifice in Eretria, related to the early cult of Apollo in Delphi.

At the centre of this edifice were preserved the clay bases supporting the laurel trunks that propped up the roof. In the early sixteenth century a second hecatompedon temple was erected through earth fills upon its Geometric predecessor, on a solid artificial terrace. This temple had wooden columns (six at the narrow sides and nineteen at the longer sides), and was subsequently covered with earth in order to build the later and most renowned of all temples in the city.

Construction started at the late sixth century BC (520-490 BC) and the temple was perhaps still unfinished when the Persians razed the city in 490 BC. Poros stone and marble were the materials used for this Doric peristyle (surrounded by colonnades) temple (6 x 14 columns). It had a prodomos (anteroom) and an opisthodomos (back section) arranged with two columns in antis; the cella (in Greek sekos was divided into three naves by two interior colonnades. After the destruction of the city by the Persians, the temple was repaired and remained in use; yet in 198 BC it was destroyed again, this time by the Romans, a fact which initiated the gradual abandonment and dilapidation of the monument until the first century BC. Some important sculptures were found and are displayed in the Chalcis museum. One of the Amazons was salvaged in antiquity and carried off to Rome. Several Niobids perhaps from the pediment of the temple were probably taken to Rome by Augustus including the dying Niobid and the running Niobid (now in the Ny Carlsberg Glyptotek).

The majority of architectural parts from this temple and other sanctuaries of the city were re-used as construction material; only a few (column) drums together with fragmented capitals and triglyphs remain from the superstructure of the monument.

Of the sumptuous sculptural decoration survive only parts of the west pediment featuring in relief the fight of the Amazons (or Amazonomachy, a usual motif for the iconography at the time). The centre was occupied by Athena and is partially preserved, depicting her trunk with the Gorgoneion on the thorax; a superb work of art is the complex of Theseus and Antiope marked by sensitivity and softness of the form, internal force and clarity, despite the ornamental tendency obvious in the coiffures and the folds of their clothes. These sculptures are impregnated by the rules of archaic plasticity; the analogies are rendered in an innovative manner, a precursor to the idealization and the force of the classical art. The entire composition supposedly featured chariots to Athena's right and left, one chariot presumably carrying Theseus and Antiope, while Hercules might ride the other, and the picture could be complemented by fighting Amazons and a dead warrior. The east pediment possibly narrated the Gigantomachy (fight of the Giants). The details of the faces and the clothes were coloured, thus rendering the depiction more vivid. Fragmented sculptures that may be part of the temple after the destruction by the Persians (warrior, Amazon and Athena's trunk) have been located in Rome. Today are visible only the foundations of the Post-Archaic temple, as well as remains of the Geometric temples uncovered in lower deposits.

The temples in the temenos of Apollo Daphniforos were excavated between 1899 and 1910 by Κ. Kourouniotis. Further investigations were conducted by Mrs. I. Konstantinou and by the Swiss Archaeological School.

=== The ancient theatre of Eretria ===
The most impressive monument of ancient Eretria, one of the oldest known theatres, lies in the western section of town, between the western gate, the stadium and the upper gymnasium; the temple of Dionysos was found at its south-west end. As indicated by the architectural remains of the scene, the initial construction phase followed the invasion by the Persians and the reconstruction of the city in the fifth century BC, whereas the fourth century BC marked the site's peak.

A striking fact is the construction of the cavea (Gr. koilo, auditorium) on an artificial hill surrounded by numerous retaining walls, instead of taking advantage of the citadel's slopes. During the first building phase, the scene looked like a palace, disposed of five adjacent rectangle rooms and found itself at the same level as the circular orchestra, leading to it via three entrances. At its peak (fourth century BC), the theatre suffered transformations and was shaped to a large extent in its present form. The cavea comprised eleven tiers divided by ten staircases. The circular orchestra was transferred for 8m to the north, and was lowered by 3m. The scene was amplified by two backstages connected through a portico with an Ionic façade, thus raising above the orchestra. This difference in heights was evened up by a vaulted underground gallery, leading through the scene to the centre of the orchestra; this was in all probability the "charonian stairway" (stairs of Hades) allowing actors impersonating chthonic deities and the dead to appear and perform at the orchestra.

Local poros stone was used for the foundation and limestone for the parodoi (passageways), which sloped to the orchestra in order to diminish the difference in height with the cavea. The theatre seated 6,300 spectators and is reminiscent in form to the Theatre of Dionysos in Athens, after transformation of the latter in 330 BC. Following the destruction of Eretria by the Romans in 198 BC, it was rebuilt with lower quality materials and the rooms to the south of the parodos were then apparently decorated with colour mortars of the first Pompeian style.

Most benches have been looted. There are still the impressive remains of the scene, especially the vaulted underground passage leading to the orchestra centre. Excavation of the monument was undertaken by the American Archaeological School, while the local Ephorate of Antiquities strived greatly for its restoration.

=== Temple of Isis ===
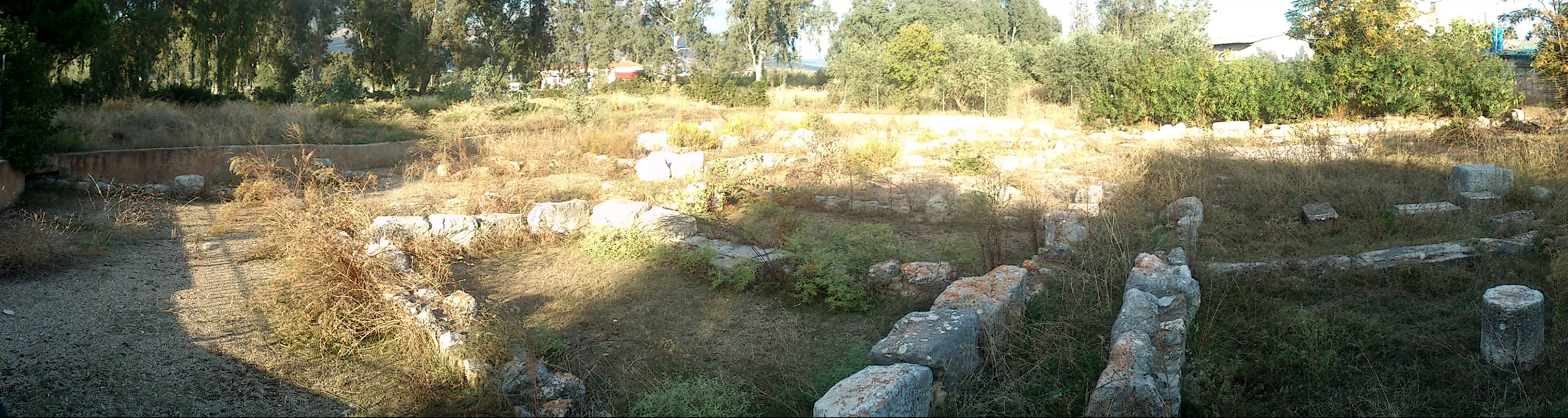
Temple of Isis at Eretria

Among the most interesting monuments of ancient Eretria is the Iseion, a temple sacred to the goddess Isis and other Egyptian deities. Situated to the south of the town, between the baths and the Lower Gymnasium or the palaistra (wrestling area), it extends behind the small harbour, a detail that correlates the temenos with merchants who had their interests in Eretria. According to excavation and inscription testimonies, the temple was probably built in the fourth century BC and was surrounded by other edifices and auxiliary spaces. The initiation to the cult of Isis and the Egyptian deities occurred during the Hellenistic period by Greek merchants who came to Greece from Egypt after the unification of the then known world by Alexander the Great. Their worship in Eretria has also been attested by inscriptions, of which the most important is set on a limestone block to the left of the prodomos (anteroom) before the cella.

The temple of Isis was initially simple and oriented to the east, with a prodomos that was distyle (two-columned) in antis. The ceremonial clay statue of the goddess stood on a base within the cella. In front of the temple was the altar and nearby a small drain tank. The temple was reconstructed after the destruction of the city by the Romans in 198 BC: it then acquired a larger external prodomos on ameliorated foundations and was surrounded by porticoes on three sides (north, south and west). Only the south-west end of the portico was covered by a roof. The columns were later replaced by a parapet. At the centre of the east forecourt was a portal facing the entrance of the sanctuary. Fifteen more edifices and auxiliary spaces lied to the north, considered by the excavators as places of purification. Among them was a courtyard and an andren (dining hall for male residents), while one room of the complex had a superb mosaic floor featuring lozenges.

Excavations at the temenos sacred to Isis and other Egyptian deities were conducted in 1917 by the then Ephor of Antiquities for the island of Evia (Euboea), Ι. Papadakis. In recent years, the Archaeological Service of the Ministry of Culture undertook further excavations in the wider area of the temple, which brought to light an additional complex of courtyards and rooms directly related to the sanctuary.

=== House with the mosaics ===
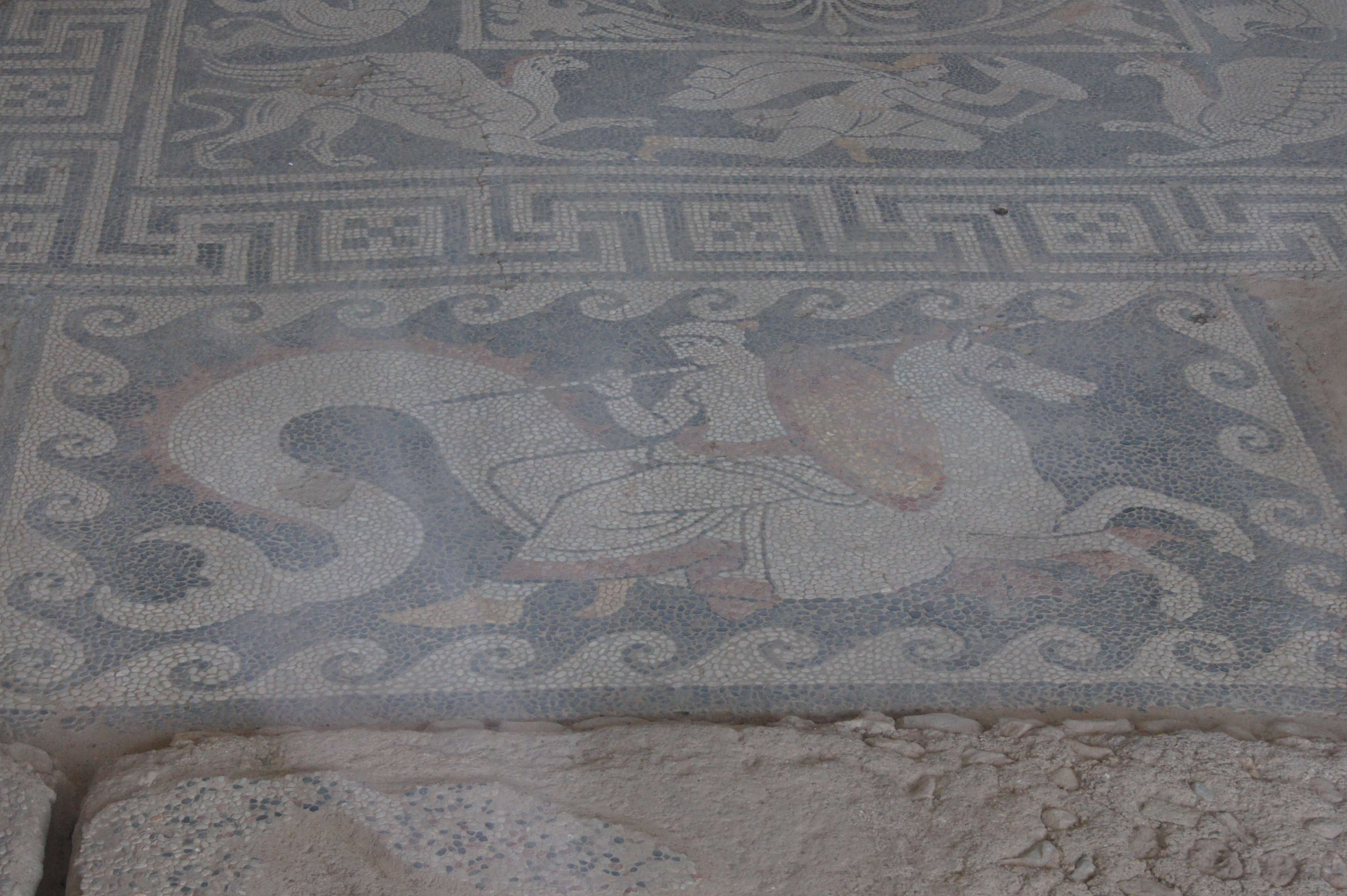
House of the mosaics

This splendid house was built in ca. 370 B.C. and remained in use for about a century. It is distinguished by its floors, covered with elegant pebble mosaics representing mythological scenes: Nereids on the back of a seahorse, legendary battles between Arimaspians and griffins, sphinxes and panthers. The building is a representative specimen of the Classical and Hellenistic domestic architecture.

In the first century BC a funerary monument with a massive rectangular peribolos was erected over the ruins of the house.

The monument was excavated between 1975 and 1980.

=== Macedonian tomb of Erotes ===
The so-called "tomb of Erotes" lies on a hill to the northwest of Eretria city and counts among the most significant monuments of Evia island. Based on the findings, it is dated to the fourth century BC, the time when these characteristic burial monuments of the Macedonian type make their appearance in southern Greece after the descent of the Macedons. More Macedonian tombs were found in the wider area around Eretria, namely in the settlements of Kotroni and Amarynthos.

The tomb of Erotes consists of a single vaulted chamber and a dromos (entrance passageway) of stone and bricks. The burial chamber is reminiscent of a residential room; it is built of poros stone plastered with white mortar. During the excavation were found two replicas of painted stone thrones bearing relief decoration. At the rear corners of the burial chamber were two marble bed-shaped sarcophagi. The tomb had been pillaged. Among the findings today exhibited in the New York Metropolitan Museum, are bronze vases and clay statuettes of Erotes (Amors), which inspired the tomb's conventional name. Above the tomb was uncovered a stone-built construction, probably the basis of a sepulchre.

The monument was excavated in 1897 and is well preserved to date.

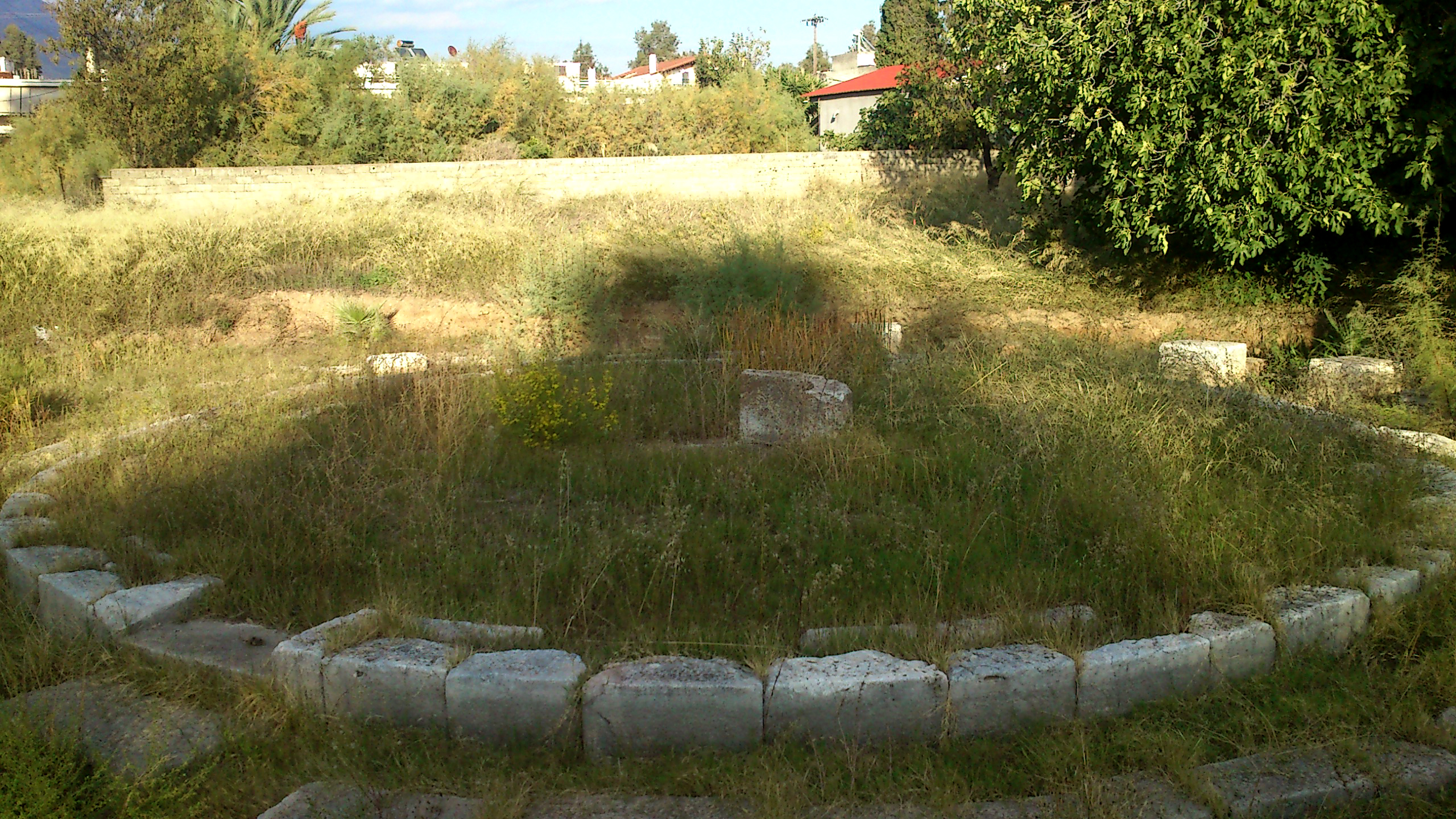
Tholos

=== Tholos ===
Excavations carried out by the Greek Archaeological Service have revealed the limestone foundations and crepis of a circular building. It was erected in the fifth century BC in the Agora of the city, and underwent several modifications in the fourth and the third centuries BC. A circular bothros has also survived at the centre of the monument.

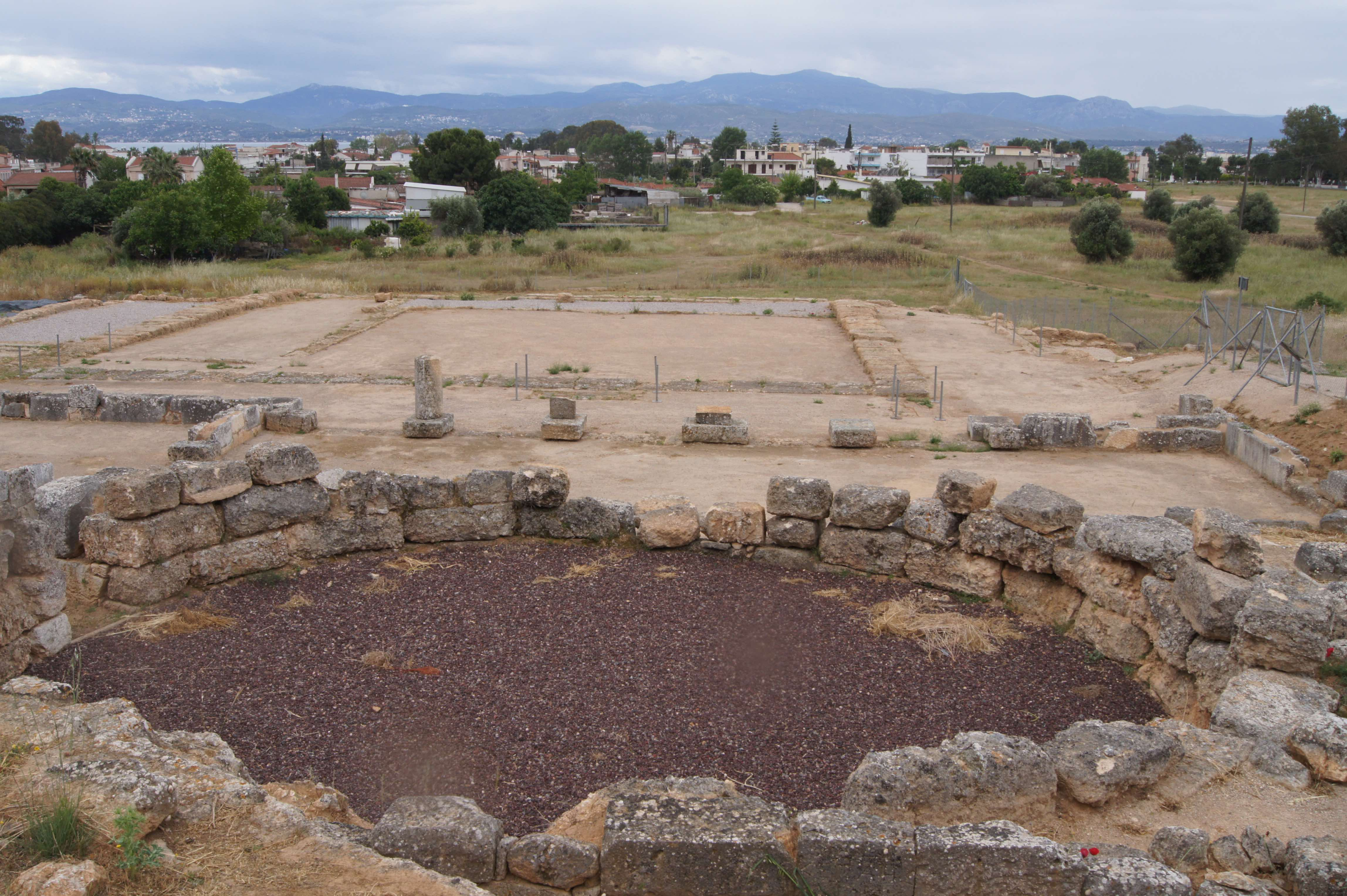
Upper Gymnasion

=== Gymnasium and Eileithyia's sanctuary ===
In 1917, archaeologists uncovered traces of a gymnasium dating to the 4th century BC. A sanctuary dedicated to Eileithyia, had been placed in the northwestern section of the building. Also, excavations in the area of the sanctuary found a well containing some 100 terracotta cups dating to the 3rd century BC. In 2018, new excavations in the area revealed more buildings.

== Modern Eretria ==
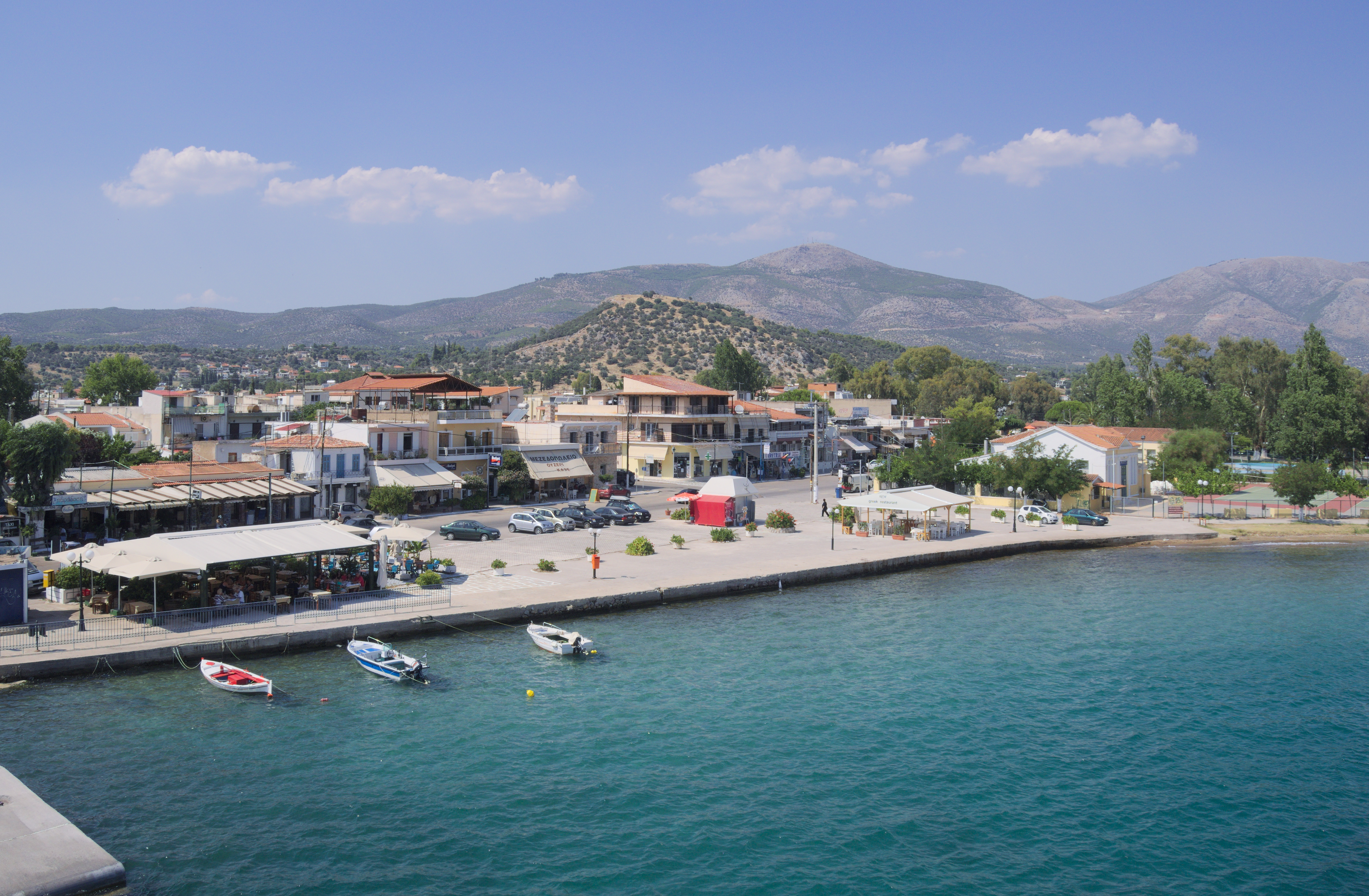
View of the harbour

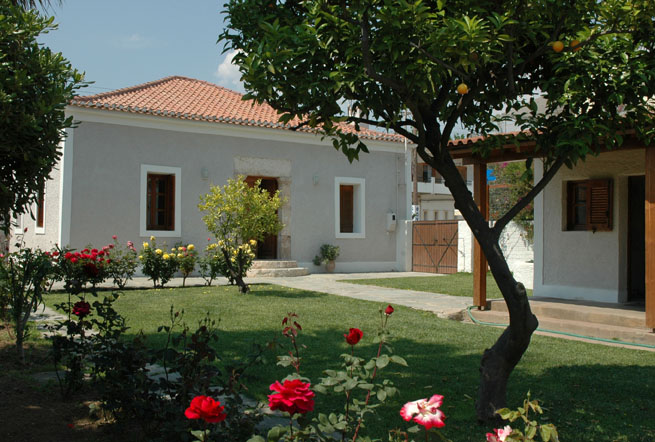
The office of the Swiss School of Archaeology in Greece at Eretria.

Modern Eretria was created in 1824 by refugees from Psara after the Destruction of Psara, who gave to their settlement the name "Nea Psara". The ancient name was revived during the first years of the independent Greek state. The new city plan was appointed by Stamatios Kleanthis and Eduard Schaubert.

The modern town of Eretria is now a popular beachside resort. The historic and archaeological finds from Eretria and Lefkandi are displayed in the Eretria Museum, established by the Swiss School of Archaeology in Greece.

The town can be reached from Skala Oropou, Attica by ferry or via Halkida by road. It is an important station on the way to the south of the island. It has many taverns and a long beach promenade. The archaeological excavations are located on the northern edge of the modern town.

== Municipality ==
The municipality Eretria was formed at the 2011 local government reform by the merger of the following two former municipalities, that became municipal units:

- Amarynthos
- Eretria

The municipality has an area of 168.557 km^{2}, the municipal unit 58.648 km^{2}.

== Historical population ==
| Year | Town | Municipal unit | Municipality |
|---|---|---|---|
| 1981 | 3,711 | - | - |
| 1991 | 3,022 | 4,987 | - |
| 2001 | 3,156 | 5,969 | - |
| 2011 | 4,166 | 6,330 | 13,053 |
| 2021 | - | 6,567 | 12,652 |

== Notable people ==
- Achaeus, tragic playwright
- Menedemus (345/4-261/0 BC), Greek philosopher
- Philoxenus (4th century BC), painter

== See also ==
- List of traditional Greek place names
