= List of Greek artists =

This is a list of Greek artists from the antiquity to today. Artists have been categorised according to their main artistic profession and according to the major historical period they lived in: the Ancient (until the foundation of the Byzantine Empire), the Byzantine (until the fall of Constantinople in 1453), Cretan Renaissance 1453–1660, Heptanese School 1660-1830 and the Modern period (1830-today). Artists working after World War II are considered Contemporary.

== Ancient Greece ==
=== Painters ===
- Agatharchus
- Antiphilus
- Apelles
- Apollodorus (painter)
- Aristides of Thebes
- Cimon of Cleonae
- Echion (painter)
- Euphranor
- Eupompus
- Melanthius
- Panaenus
- Parrhasius
- Pausias
- Polyeidos (poet)
- Polygnotus
- Protogenes
- Theon of Samos
- Zeuxis

=== Potters ===
- Andokides
- Brygos
- Ergoteles
- Ergotimos
- Euphronios
- Euthymides
- Exekias
- Hermogenes
- Kachrylion
- Nearchos
- Nikosthenes
- Phintias
- Phrynos
- Sokles

=== Architects ===
- Apollodorus of Damascus
- Callimachus (sculptor)
- Chersiphron
- Dinocratis
- Eupalinus
- Iktinos
- Kallikrates
- Metagenes
- Mnesikles
- Aeulius Nicon
- Philon
- Pythis
- Satyros
- Sostratus of Cnidus

=== Novelists ===
- Achilles Tatius
- Antonius Diogenes
- Chariton
- Heliodorus of Emesa
- Iamblichus (novelist)
- Longus
- Lucian
- Xenophon of Ephesus

=== Actors ===
- Metrobius
- Thespis
- Homer

=== Dramatists and playwrights ===
- Achaeus of Eretria
- Achaeus of Syracuse
- Aeschylus
- Agathon
- Alexander Aetolus
- Alexis
- Anaxandrides
- Antiphanes
- Aphareus (writer)
- Apollodorus of Carystus
- Aristarchus of Tegea
- Aristophanes
- Carcinus (writer)
- Chaeremon
- Choerilus (tragic poet)
- Cleophon (poet)
- Cratinus
- Diphilus
- Epicharmus of Kos
- Eupolis
- Euripides
- Hegemon of Thasos
- Herodas
- Ion of Chios
- Iophon
- Menander
- Neophron
- Nicochares
- Pherecrates
- Philemon (poet)
- Phrynichus (comic poet)
- Phrynichus (tragic poet)
- Plato (comic poet)
- Pratinas
- Rhinthon
- Sophocles
- Sositheus
- Strattis
- Theodectes
- Xenocles

== Byzantine Greece ==
=== Poets ===
- Christopher of Mytilene
- Michael Glycas
- John Mauropous
- Vitsentzos Kornaros
- Michael Tarchaniota Marullus
- Paul the Silentiary
- Manuel Philes
- George Pisida
- Michael Psellos
- John Tzetzes

=== Painters ===
- Theodore Apsevdis
- Michael Astrapas and Eutychios
- Theophanes the Greek
- Manuel Panselinos
- Ioannis Pagomenos
- Eulalios

=== Architects ===
- Anthemius of Tralles
- Isidore of Miletus

=== Writers ===
- Nicephorus Blemmydes
- Nicholas Cabasilas
- Cassianus Bassus
- Demetrius Chalcondylas
- Michael Choniates
- Coluthus
- Constantine Manasses
- Constantine VII
- Cosmas Indicopleustes
- Eustathius of Thessalonica
- Patriarch Gregory II of Constantinople
- Hesychius of Miletus
- Kekaumenos
- Leontios of Neapolis
- Leontius (writer)
- Joannes Laurentius Lydus
- Mazaris
- Patriarch Photios I of Constantinople
- Leontius Pilatus
- Rhetorius
- Simeon Seth
- Theodore Prodromus
- Theodorus Hyrtacenus
- Anna Comnena
- Constantine VII Porphyrogenitus
- Isaac of Nineveh
- John of Damascus
- Michael Psellos
- Procopius
- Zozimus

== Post Byzantine Greece ==
=== Theater ===
- Georgios Chortatzis
- Vitsentzos Kornaros

=== Music ===
- Francisco Leontaritis
- Michele Stratico
- Konstantinos Agathophron Nikolopoulos
- Petros Peloponnesios

=== Painting ===
==== Italian and Spanish Renaissance Painters ====
- Marco Basaiti
- El Greco
- Ioannis Permeniates
- Victor
- Belisario Corenzio
- Antonio Vassilacchi
- Jorge Manuel Theotocópuli

==== Cretan Renaissance Painters ====
- Angelos Akotantos
- Antonios Papadopoulos
- Andreas Pavias
- Angelos Pitzamanos
- Andreas Ritzos
- Nikolaos Tzafouris
- Michael Damaskinos
- Emmanuel Lambardos
- Emmanuel Tzanfournaris
- Fragkos Katelanos
- Ioannis Apakas
- Georgios Klontzas
- Markos Bathas
- Thomas Bathas
- Onufri
- Theophanes the Cretan
- Elias Moskos
- Ioannis Moskos
- Leos Moskos
- Franghias Kavertzas
- Emmanuel Tzanes
- Konstantinos Tzanes
- Victor (iconographer)
- Dionysius of Fourna

==== Heptanese School Painters ====
- Stephanos Tzangarolas
- Nikolaos Kallergis
- Spyridon Sperantzas
- Spiridione Roma
- Theodore Poulakis
- Nikolaos Doxaras
- Nikolaos Kantounis
- Nikolaos Koutouzis
- Gerasimos Pitsamanos
- Spyridon Ventouras
- Konstantin Kapıdağlı

==== Neo-Hellenikos Diafotismos in Painting ====
- Panagiotis Doxaras
- Christodoulos Kalergis
- Eustație Altini
- Ioannis Kornaros

== Modern Greece ==
=== Painters ===
- Constantine Andreou
- Christodoulos Aronis
- Giorgio de Chirico
- Alexandros Christofis
- Tasos Chonias
- Hermon di Giovanno
- Electros
- Nikos Engonopoulos
- Costas Evangelatos
- Demetrios Farmakopoulos
- Alekos Fassianos
- Demetrios Galanis
- Katerina Grolliou
- Nicholaos Gysis
- Nikos Hadjikyriakos-Ghikas
- Theophilos Hatzimihail
- Georgios Jakobides
- Christos Kapralos
- Photios Kontoglou
- Spyros Koukoulomatis
- Kourouniotis
- Marios Loizides
- Nikiphoros Lytras
- Yiannis Moralis
- Theocharis Mores
- Dimitris Mytaras
- Nicos Nicolaides
- Nikos Nikolaou
- Périclès Pantazis
- George Papassavas
- Mina Papatheodorou-Valyraki
- Stass Paraskos
- Konstantinos Parthenis
- Yiannis Poulakas
- Yiannis Psychopedis
- Penelope Schizodimou
- Yiannis Spyropoulos
- Yannis Stavrou
- Nikos Stratakis
- Panayiotis Tetsis
- Epameinondas Thomopoulos
- Yannis Tsarouchis
- Alexandros Tzannis
- Antonio Vassilacchi
- Spyros Vassiliou
- Lydia Venieri
- Konstantinos Volanakis
- Constantin Xenakis
- Nikolaos Xydias Typaldos
- Odysseus Yakoumakis
- Vasileia Sarri

=== Sculptors ===
- Joannis Avramidis
- Constantine Andreou
- Chryssa
- Kostas Dikefalos
- Aggelika Korovessi
- Jannis Kounellis
- Memos Makris
- Thodoros Papadimitriou
- Thodoros Papayiannis
- Nikolaos Pavlopoulos
- Pavlos Prosalentis
- Takis
- Electros (also known as Babis Vekris)
- Lydia Venieri
- Constantin Xenakis
- Iannis Xenakis
- Nikos Sofialakis

=== Film directors ===
- Kostas Andritsos
- Theo Angelopoulos
- Michael Cacoyannis
- George Pan Cosmatos
- Costa Gavras
- Iakovos Kambanelis
- Giorgos Konstadinou
- Nikos Koundouros
- Manakis brothers
- Nico Mastorakis
- Laura Neri
- Dimitris Papamichael
- Nikos Papatakis
- Pavlos Tassios
- Vassilis Photopoulos
- Yannis Smaragdis
- George Tzavellas
- Agnès Varda
- Dimitris Voyatzis

=== Poets ===
- Aris Alexandrou
- Manolis Anagnostakis
- Olga Broumas
- Demetrios Capetanakis
- Constantine P. Cavafy
- Athanasios Christopoulos
- Nikos Dimou
- Odysseas Elytis
- Andreas Embirikos
- Nikos Engonopoulos
- Costas Evangelatos
- Rigas Feraios
- Nikos Gatsos
- Demetris Th. Gotsis
- Sotiris Kakisis
- Ektor Kaknavatos
- Andreas Kalvos
- Iakovos Kambanelis
- Nikos Karouzos
- Kostas Karyotakis
- Nikos Kavvadias
- Nikos Kazantzakis
- Antigone Kefala
- Napoleon Lapathiotis
- Dimitris Lyacos
- Jean Moréas
- Kostis Palamas
- Alexandros Panagoulis
- Lefteris Papadopoulos
- George Pavlopoulos
- Maria Polydouri
- Alexandros Rhizos Rhankaves
- Yiannis Ritsos
- Miltos Sachtouris
- Giorgos Seferis
- Angelos Sikelianos
- Takis Sinopoulos
- Giannis Skarimpas
- Dionysios Solomos
- Alexandros Soutsos
- Alexis Stamatis
- Theodore Stephanides
- Nanos Valaoritis
- Kostas Varnalis
- Vassilis Vassilikos
- Haris Vlavianos
- Yannis Yfantis

=== Novelists ===
- Andreas Karkavitsas
- Georgios Balanos
- Penelope Delta
- Apostolos Doxiadis
- Vicky Hadjivassiliou
- Andreas Kalvos
- Christos Kapralos
- Nikos Kazantzakis
- Photios Kontoglou
- Adamantios Korais
- Ioannis Kottounios
- Yannis Makriyannis
- Menis Koumantareas
- Alexandros Papadiamantis
- Zacharias Papantoniou
- Pythagoras Papastamatiou
- Ioannis Psycharis
- Giannis Skarimpas
- Soti Triantafyllou
- Vassilis Vassilikos
- Demetrius Vikelas
- Alki Zei

=== Dramatists and playwrights ===
- Angelos Terzakis
- Crates (comic poet)
- Apostolos Doxiadis
- Nikos Kazantzakis
- Dimitris Lyacos
- M. Karagatsis
- Nicos Nicolaides
- Dimitris Psathas
- Alexandros Rhizos Rhankaves
- Giannis Skarimpas

=== Musicians ===
==== Ancient period ====
- Alypius
- Terpander

==== Modern period ====
- Rita Abatzi
- Maurice Abravanel
- Art Alexakis
- Louis Demetrius Alvanis
- Theodore Antoniou
- Grigoris Asikis
- Nikolas Asimos
- Gina Bachauer
- Arion
- Yiorgos Batis
- Grigoris Bithikotsis
- Miltiades Caridis
- Pavlos Carrer
- Petros Christo
- Nikos Christodoulou
- Jani Christou
- Christos Dantis
- Dionysios Demetis
- Odysseas Dimitriadis
- Marina Diamandis
- Dimitris Dragatakis
- Antiochos Evangelatos
- Sarah P.
- Kostas Exarhakis
- Yorgos Foudoulis
- Alexander Frey
- Gus G.
- Katy Garbi
- Michalis Genitsaris
- Christos Govetas
- Manos Hadjidakis
- Alkinoos Ioannidis
- Sotiris Kakisis
- George Kallis
- Manolis Kalomiris
- Iakovos Kambanelis
- Alex Kapranos
- Eleni Karaindrou
- Herbert von Karajan
- Nikos Karvelas
- Antonios Katinaris
- Bob Katsionis
- Leonidas Kavakos
- Stelios Kazantzidis
- Areti Ketime
- Panayiotis Kokoras
- Iakovos Kolanian
- Stavros Koujioumtzis
- Akis Katsoupakis
- Rena Kyriakou
- Andreas Lagios
- Alexandre Lagoya
- Tim Lambesis
- Leo Leandros
- Manos Loizos
- Andreas Makris
- Sokratis Malamas
- Ilan Manouach
- Nikolaos Mantzaros
- Giannis Markopoulos
- Kostas Martakis
- Alex Martinez
- Thanos Mikroutsikos
- Dimitris Mitropoulos
- Kostas Mountakis
- Georges Moustaki
- Orianthi Panagaris
- Tzimis Panousis
- Lefteris Papadimitriou
- Lefteris Papadopoulos
- Thanassis Papakonstantinou
- Elena Paparizou
- Apostolos Paraskevas
- Stelios Perpiniadis
- Phivos
- Sadahzinia
- Sakis Rouvas
- Spyros Samaras
- Dionysis Savvopoulos
- Kyriakos Sfetsas
- Dimitris Sgouros
- Pavlos Sidiropoulos
- Nikos Skalkottas
- Kostas Skarvelis
- Camille-Marie Stamaty
- Giorgos Theofanous
- Marios Tokas
- Sakis Tolis
- Tatiana Troyanos
- Iovan Tsaous
- Vassilis Tsitsanis
- Markos Vamvakaris
- Despina Vandi
- Vangelis
- Marios Varvoglis
- Anna Vissi
- Haris Xanthoudakis
- Stavros Xarhakos
- Iannis Xenakis
- Nikos Xilouris
- Nikos Xydakis
- Spyridon Xyndas
- Mirka Yemendzakis
- Yanni
- Savvas Ysatis

== Contemporary Artists ==
=== Visual Artists (mixed or new media, interdisciplinary, photography, film, performance, other) ===
- Loukia Alavanou
- Andreas Angelidakis
- Manolis Anastasakos
- Aggelos Antonopoulos
- Arelis
- Nikos Arvanitis
- Bill Balaskas
- Kostas Bassanos
- Pantelis Chandris
- Nikos Charalambidis
- Dionisis Christofilogiannis
- Anastasia Douka
- Dora Economou
- Eirene Efstathiou
- Stelios Faitakis
- Alexandros Georgiou
- Marina Gioti
- Maria Glyka
- Guerrilla Optimists
- Effie Halivopoulou
- Zoe Hatziyannaki
- Dionisis Kavallieratos
- Giorgos Kazazis
- Panos Kokkinias
- Georgia Kotretsos
- Marinos Koutsomichalis
- Maria Loizidou
- Andreas Lolis
- Dimitrios Skalkotos
- Panos Kokkinias
- Miltos Manetas
- Lena Mitsolidou
- Nina Papaconstantinou
- Agelos Papadimitriou
- Maria Papadimitriou
- Nikos Papadimitriou
- Ilias Papailiakis
- Nina Pappa
- Antonis Pittas
- Poka-Yo
- Afroditi Psarra
- Madalina Psoma
- Thalia Raftopoulou
- Georgia Sagri
- Kostis Stafylakis
- Eva Stefani
- Stefania Strouza
- Penelope Schizodimou
- Lina Theodorou
- Panos Tsagaris
- Giorgos Tserionis
- Kostas Tsolis
- Maria Varela
- George-Maran Varthalitis
- Alexandros Vasmoulakis
- Kostis Velonis
- Vangelis Vlahos
- Vassilis Vlastaras
- Zafos Xagoraris
- Myrto Xanthopoulou
- Yorgos Zois

== Art Historians ==
- Manolis Hatzidakis

== Art Curators ==
- Dimitios Spyrou
- Evita Tsokanta
- Elpida Karaba
- Iliana Fokianaki
- Maya Tounta
- Kika Kyriakakou
- Ioanna Gerakidi

== Art Magazines | Journals | websites ==
- peri-technes
- enterprise projects

== Nonprofit organisations ==
THE TELOS SOCIETY ARCAthens ARCH Kaktos Project
