= Varthalitis =

Varthalitis is a surname. Notable people with the surname include:

- Antonios Varthalitis (1924–2007), Roman Catholic archbishop
- George-Maran Varthalitis, Greek artist
