= Mykonos Biennale =

- Genre: Contemporary art, film, performance
- Frequency: Biennial (odd-numbered years)
- Locations: Mykonos, Greece (and nearby Delos)
- Founded: 2013
- Founder: Lydia Venieri
- Website: www.mykonosbiennale.com

The Mykonos Biennale is a biennial contemporary art and cultural event held on the Greek island of Mykonos, with some activities extending to the nearby island of Delos. It was founded in 2013 by Greek artist Lydia Venieri. The event features visual art exhibitions and installations, short-film screenings, video-art projections, performances, and related programs, often staged in non-traditional or historic venues across the island.

Organizers describe the biennale as more of a symposium integrating art and philosophy with the setting of Mykonos than a conventional large-scale international biennial exhibition. It typically runs for roughly one week in odd-numbered years, frequently in late summer or early autumn.

== History ==
The inaugural edition took place 21–24 June 2013 under the theme “Crisis and Paganism.” It was organized by Venieri (with director Antonis Kioukas) and included works by more than 70 international artists, among them Lucas Samaras, Takis, Karen Finley, and Apichatpong Weerasethakul. Activities encompassed exhibitions, performances, dance, and an international video film festival, with events held in various locations on Mykonos and Delos, including museums, the School of Fine Arts, mills, and Cine Manto.

Subsequent editions have continued on a roughly biennial schedule in odd-numbered years. Recurring program elements have included:

- Dramatic Nights – an international short-film selection
- Video Graffiti – video projections in the old town (Chora)
- Site-specific projects, including artist “Antidote” boxes hidden on Delos for a treasure-hunt format in some years

The event has been regularly covered in Greek cultural media, including CultureNow.gr (multiple editions), Days of Art in Greece, Andro.gr, and Volta Magazine. It is listed among Mykonos cultural festivals and noted in the context of Venieri’s artistic practice.

== Editions ==
- 2013 – Crisis & Paganism (21–24 June)
- 2015 – Antidote (early July and late August dates reported)
- 2017 – Trans Allegoria (1–5 September)
- 2019 – Apathia (25–30 September)
- 2021 – 1821 (early October; under the auspices of the Greek Ministry of Culture and Tourism and the Greek National Tourism Organization)
- 2023 – Φ, Orphic Mysteries (27 September–3 October; venues included the Archaeological Museum of Mykonos, Delos, streets of Chora, and the Yellow Tower in Ano Mera)
- 2025 – 9 – The Amphibian (25–30 September)

Themes are typically announced by the organizers and draw on mythological, philosophical, or historical ideas. Detailed artist lists and full programs appear on the official website and in contemporary coverage of individual editions.

== Reception and coverage ==
Independent or semi-independent mentions appear in Greek arts and culture sites (CultureNow.gr across multiple editions, Days of Art in Greece, Andro.gr, Volta Magazine) as well as international English-language outlets and databases. These include Rhizome (2013), The Arts Shelf and Global Traveler (2017), Whitehot Magazine (2024, in the context of Venieri), Tripbase, YAL’OOU (2025), FilmFreeway, and Artfacts. The biennale is also referenced in the Wikipedia article on Mykonos. Coverage has generally focused on the event’s existence, themes, venues, and program components rather than extensive critical reviews in major international art publications.
