= Hegemon of Thasos =

Ancient Greek poet

Hegemon of Thasos (Greek: Ἡγήμων ὁ Θάσιος) was a Greek writer of the Old Comedy. Hardly anything is known of him, except that he flourished during the Peloponnesian War. According to Aristotle (Poetics, ii. 5) he was the inventor of a kind of parody; by slightly altering the wording in well-known poems he transformed the sublime into the ridiculous. When the news of the disastrous defeat of the Sicilian Expedition reached Athens, his parody of the Gigantomachia was being performed: it is said that the audience were so amused by it that, instead of leaving to show their grief, they remained in their seats.

He was also the author of a comedy called Philinne (Philine), written in the manner of Eupolis and Cratinus, in which he attacked a well-known courtesan. Athenaeus (p. 698), who preserves some parodic hexameters of his, relates other anecdotes concerning him (pp. 5, 108, 407).

== Criticisms ==
In Aristotle's Poetics, Aristotle states "Homer, for example, makes men better than they are; Cleophon as they are; Hegemon the Thasian, the inventor of parodies, and Nicochares, the author of the Diliad, worse than they are."

== Sources ==
- This work in turn cites:
  - T. Kock, Comicorum Atticorum fragmenta, i. (1880). This work has fragments of Hegemon's works.
  - B. J. Peltzer, De parodica Graecorum poesi (1855)

See also The Oxford Classical Dictionary (=OCD), edited by S. Hornblower et al., Oxford 2012, s.v. Hegemon, of Thasos, p. 652. This article in turn cites:

Fragments:

- Parody: P. Brandt, Corpusculum poesis epicae graece ludibundae 1 (1888), 37–49
- Comedy: PCG5. 546–7.

Interpretation:

- Meineke, FCG 1. 214 f.;
- Wilamowitz, Hermes 1905, 173 f. Kl. Schr. 4 (1962), 220 f.;
- A. Körte, RE 7/2 (1912), 2595 f. 'Hegemon' 3;
- D. Panomitros, Parnassus 45 (2003), 145–62.

See also D. Panomitros,"Hegemon of Thasos and Pleasure from Parody, Ancient Testimonies and Eustathius on the Parodist", Proceedings of the XIth Congress of FIEC, v.3, Athens 2004:504-513.
