= Madonna and Child Enthroned with Saints John the Baptist and Augustine =

Painting by Ioannis Permeniates

- Θεοτόκος Ένθρονη, Ιω Πρόδρομος, Αυγουστίνος (Greek), La Madonna tra San Giovanni Battista e Sant'Agostino (Italian)
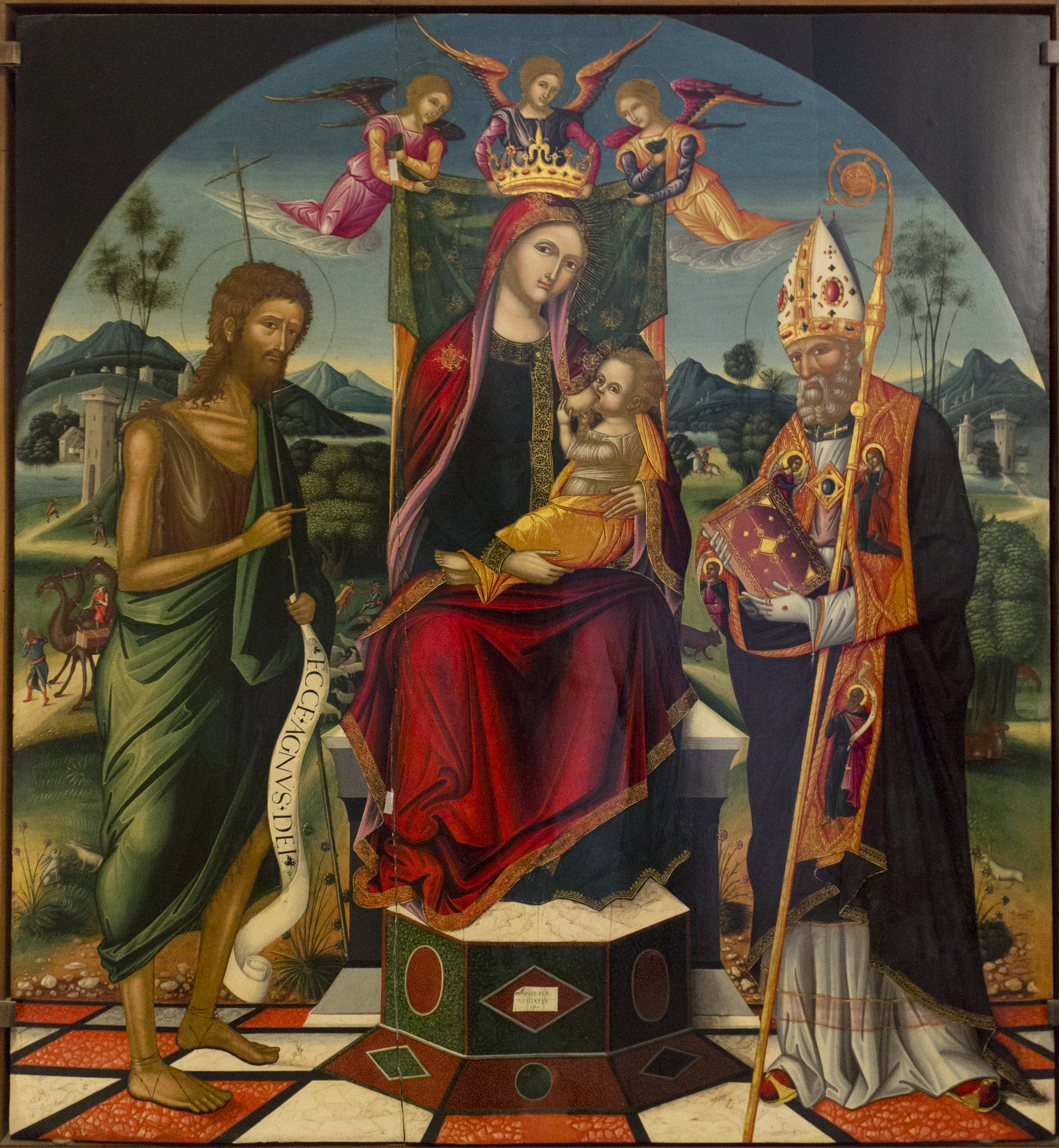
- Artist: Ioannis Permeniates
- Year: 1520–1530
- Medium: Oil on panel
- Subject: Nursing Madonna with Saints John the Baptist and Augustine
- Dimensions: 126 cm × 116 cm (49.6 in × 45.6 in)
- Location: Museo Correr, Venice, Italy
- Owner: Museo Correr

The Madonna and Child Enthroned with Saints John the Baptist and Augustine is an oil painting by the Greek painter Ioannis Permeniates. He was from Crete and lived in Venice. He was active during the first part of the 16th century. There are dozens of works attributed to the artist, who painted in both the Italo-Byzantine and Venetian styles. Other similar artists were El Greco and Michael Damaskinos. Permeniates's work was influenced by that of Vittore Carpaccio and Giovanni Bellini. The Madonna and Child Enthroned with Saints John the Baptist and Augustine is his most notable painting. It is part of the collection of the Museo Correr in Venice.

== Description ==
The work is an oil painting on panel with dimensions of 126 cm × 116 cm (49.6 in × 45.6 in). It was created in the early part of the 16th century. The painting depicts the enthroned Madonna nursing the Christ child. Two angels are holding a holy cloth behind the Virgin, while an angel in the center places a crown upon her head. She is rewarded for her holy sacrifice while she is nurturing Christ. The floor below the Virgin is tiled with elaborate colors. The platform is decorated with circular and diamond shapes.

Saint Augustine is depicted in elaborate attire, wearing a jeweled mitre and holding a gold-ornamented scepter. His stole is decorated with images of religious figures, and he holds a religious book. By contrast, John the Baptist is portrayed as a humble servant, reflecting the traditional iconography of this saint. He holds a banderole inscribed with the Latin phrase ECCE AGNVS DEI ('Behold the Lamb of God'). Although the work is executed in the Italian style, it retains a distinct Byzantine charm.

The painter tries to adopt a landscape and captures colors and stimuli similar to Vittore Carpaccio and Giovanni Bellini. Permeniates strives for the perfection of the line and immobilizes everything in a magical aura, placed out of time, not without its subtle charm, as if castles, knights, animals, plants, and stones had crystallized under an unnatural light. The painting also features camels, a common motif in Permeniates's works. He also produced another painting of the same subjects but also including Saints Jerome and Andrew, now in the Museo Nazionale in Ravenna.

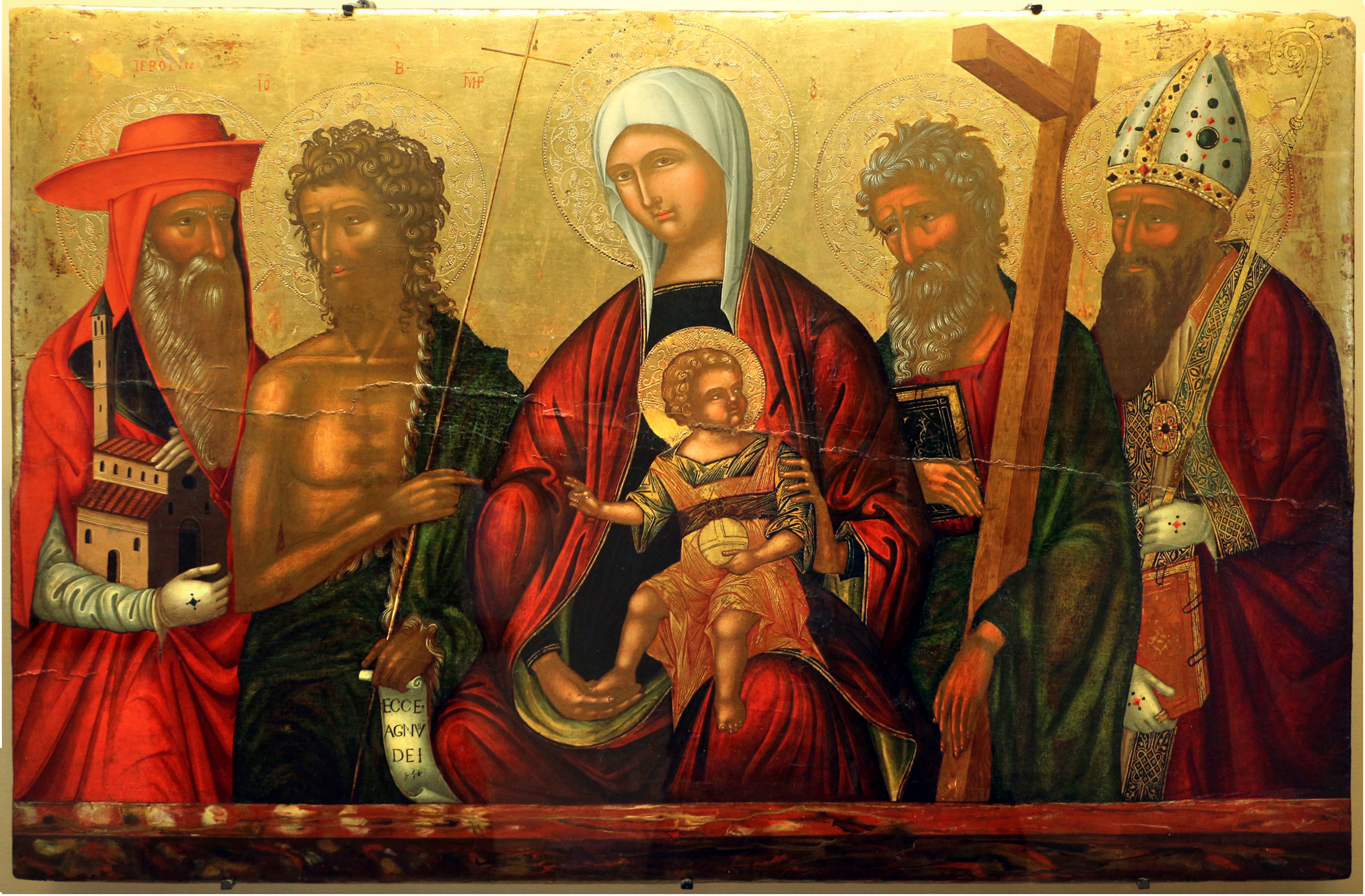
Ioannis Permeniates, Madonna and Child with Saints Jerome, John the Baptist, Andrew and Augustine, Museo Nazionale, Ravenna
