= Nicochares =

Athenian poet of the Old Comedy style

Nicochares (Greek: Νικοχάρης, died ca. 345 BC) was an Athenian poet of the Old Comedy, son of the comic playwright Philonides and contemporary with Aristophanes. The titles of Nicochares' plays, as enumerated by the Suda, are, Αμυμώνη (Amymone), Πέλοψ (Pelops), Γαλάτεια (Galatea), Ηρακλής Γάμων (Hercules Getting Married), Ηρακλής Χορηγός (Hercules the Play-Producer), Κρήτες (Cretans), Λάκωνες (The Laconians), Λημνίαι (Lemnian Women), Κένταυροι (Centaurs), and Χειρογάστορες (Those Living Hand-to-Mouth). Augustus Meineke suggested that the Amymone and Pelops may have been alternative names for the same work, as the Suda lists the two works together when all of the others are in alphabetical order, and a fragment of Amymone quoted by Athenaeus mentions Oenomaus, the father-in-law of Pelops.

Aristotle also credited to him in his Poetics the lost parody of the Iliad titled Diliad, or Deiliad (Δειλιάς < δειλία "cowardice", a pun on the Iliad). He stated that "Homer, for example, makes men better than they are; Cleophon as they are; Hegemon the Thasian, the inventor of parodies, and Nicochares, the author of the Diliad, worse than they are."

From the extant fragments of Nicochares' work, one can only infer that he treated in the style of the Old Comedy—occasionally rising into tragic dignity. It is also evident that his comedies were influenced by the legends and local traditions of his country, and, undoubtedly, served to ridicule the peculiarities of the neighboring states.
