= Dimitri Kourouniotis =

Greek contemporary artist

Dimitri Kourouniotis (born 1965 in Greece) is a contemporary artist based in San Francisco specializing in abstract paintings. He settled in San Francisco after graduate work in the United Kingdom.

Bold color and energetic gestures typify his artwork.
