= Christos Kapralos =

Greek artist

Christos Kapralos (Greek: Χρήστος Καπράλος, 1909 – 20 January 1993) was a Greek artist born in Panaitolio (or Moustafouli) in the former municipality of Thesties (now part of the municipality of Agrinio).

He studied drawing at a school with the help of the Agrinian Papastratou Bros. and continued studied drawing in Paris at the Académie de la Grande Chaumière and at Académie Colarossi, he had a student named Oumbertos Argyros, his professor was Marcel Gimond. He returned to Greece and Panaitolio in 1945 and in 1946, he moved to Athens and later to Aigina.

Christos Kapralos in that connection with the bas-relief for the memory of the Battle of Pindus during World War II, on which he worked between 1940 and 1945 stuck in his village. After the end of the war, march along with the rhapsody of history of modern Hellenism.

In May 1964 in Zygos gallery, A. Tasos he presented his large black and white wooden arts with the mind from the Greek Civil War, one memory for all lost friends of his younger days. From his works forgets the civil war which was set in 1961 and completed his works "The men".

His works were intensely anthropocentric with the inspiration of Ancient Greek art and mythology. His works were presented with many expositions not only in Greece, but also in the rest of the world. In Agrinio in 1996, functioned the only sculpture exposition in the Kapralos Art Screen which is founded in the wall of the Papastrateias Public Library. His works include 60 small works with great length from the beginning of his career from 1930 until 1956. Between those works separate the work Figoura 1951, Melpomene (1940–1945), Kazuo Kikuchi, a Japanese student from Paris (1937) and Christopher (1940–1945).

Bronze and marble works which he displayed in Athens from 1960 until 1993 in the front of the building, it lets in Athens in the factory at 7 Tripou Street in Koukaki.

In the island of Aigina which Kapralos often visited in the summer months, the Christos Kapralos Museum was founded in his honor. There are six workshops in the museum, that contain all the works which were displayed in Aigina every summer from 1963 until 1993.
