= Nikos Stratakis =

Greek painter

Nikos Stratakis (born 1960) is a Greek painter of the contemporary period. He was born in Heraklion, Crete. He grew up in Athens and he studied at the Athens School of Fine Arts. His professors were Yannis Moralis and Dimitris Mytaras (painting) and Vassilis Vassiliadis (set design). As a student he worked as a set designer assistant and as a set designer for Greek and foreign film productions. After his graduation, he has been working strictly as a painter, professionally. He lives and works in Athens, Greece. His works can be found in the collections of Greek museums, ministries and in notable private collections in Greece and abroad.

== Artistic activity ==
=== Solo exhibitions ===
- 1990: “Ora” Gallery. Athens, Greece.
- 1990: Gallery in Milies Pilion, Greece.
- 1991: Doukissis Plakentias Manor. Athens, Greece.
- 1991: “ Epohes” Gallery. Athens, Greece.
- 1992: “Ora” Gallery. Athens, Greece.
- 1993. “Miranta” Gallery. Hydra, Greece.
- 1993: “Chrysa” Gallery. Katerini, Greece.
- 1994: “Anny Balta” Gallery. Thessaloniki, Greece.
- 1995: “Athens”(Aithousa Texnis Athinon) Gallery. Athens, Greece.
- 1997: “Chrysa” Gallery. Katerini, Greece.
- 2016: "Everlasting Blue" S.G.Art Gallery. Athens. Greece
- 2018: "Recent Works" Imperial Hotel and Resort. Corfu, Greece
- 2018: "Olive and Culture" The Life Goddess. London, United Kingdom
- 2018: "Olive" "Chrysa" Gallery. Katerini, Greece.
- From 1999 until 2007 he had been exclusively represented by “Rarity” Gallery in Mykonos, Greece.

=== International Art Fairs ===
- 2019: Art Revolution Taipei. Taiwan

=== Group exhibitions ===
- 1986: Graduates of the Athens School of Fine Arts. Heraclion Crete, Greece.
- 1992: “Ora” Gallery. Athens, Greece
- 1993: “Frissiras Collection”. Byzantine Museum of Zakynthos. Greece
- 1994: Christmas Cards 1994. Athens Society of Spastics. Athens, Greece.
- 1994: “Polyedro” Gallery. Patras, Greece.
- 1995: “Parataxis- Contradictions”. Vicky Dracos in cooperation with Citibank. Athens, Greece.
- 1995: “Between Humanism and Modern Times”. Campus Arts and Sciences. Iris Kritikou (curator). Athens, Greece.
- 1995: “Erotica”. Graduates’ of the Athens School of Fine Arts Association Building. Athens, Greece.
- 1995: “Athens” (Aithousa Tehnis Athinon) Gallery. Athens, Greece.
- 1996: “Frissiras Collection”. Municipal Gallery of Athens. Athens, Greece.
- 1996: "10+4=" Municipality of Eleusis, Aisxylia 1996
- 1997: “Foci of the gaze”: work of neo- representational artists, Larissa Contemporary Art Centre under the National Cultural Network of Cities and the Ministry of Culture- Municipality of Larissa. Larissa, Greece.
- 1997: “Piraeus Street: transformations of an industrial landscape” on the care of the Ministry of Environment and the Municipality of Athens. Athens, Greece.
- 1999: Historical and Folklore Museum of Aegina. Aegina, Greece.
- 1999: “Greek Arts and Collections”. Hellenic Society for the Protection of the Environment and Cultural Heritage, Society for the Preservation of Greek Heritage USA. The exhibition and auction was organized by Christie's. Athens, Greece.
- 1999: “Vaso Batagianni” Gallery. Trikala, Greece.
- 1999: Municipal Gallery of Elefsina, Greece.
- 2000: “Rosy Oikonomidou” Gallery. Thessaloniki, Greece.
- 2000: “Tins”.Museum of the Greek Infantile Art . Athens, Greece.
- 2000: “Summer 2000”. Aithousa Tehnis Athinon (Athens Gallery).
- 2001: “Blue Outremer”. Credit Agricole Indosuez (org.). Iris Kritikou (curator). Athens, Greece.
- 2002: “Landscape and History in Archipelagos”. Exhibition of the Ministry for the Aegean collection. Athens, Greece.
- 2003: “Oikade”- Cretan Artists. Rethymnon Centre for Contemporary Art. Rethymnon, Greece.
- 2004: “Chrysa” Gallery, Katerini, Greece.
- 2005: “Ten years touring around Greek art”. Gerolymatos collection. Athens, Greece.
- 2008: “Art- Life for the Planet”. Auction. Goulandris Museum of Natural History- Gaia Centre. Athens, Greece.
- 2008: “Chrysa” Gallery. Katerini, Greece.
- 2009: “With Red or White”. Exhibition of George's Olympios collection of painted wine bottles. Macedonian Museum of Contemporary Art, Thessaloniki, Greece
- 2009: “Notes on a Tree”. City of Athens Cultural Center. Athens, Greece .
- 2009: Inauguration of the Vranas Industrial Museum of Olive Oil and its permanent art collection in Papados, Lesvos Island, Greece. The museum was created by the non- profit society “Archipelagos” with the support of Greek Parliament.
- 2009: “It happened in Athens”. City of Athens Cultural Center. Athens, Greece.[]
- 2010: “Sweet Summer”. Historical and Folklore Museum of Aegina. Aegina, Greece
- 2010: “Tracing Istanbul”. Sismanoglio Manor- Theological School of Halki- Gazi, Athens under the Hellenic National Commission of UNESCO. Istanbul, Turkey and Athens, Greece .
- 2010: “Art in the Farm”. Porto Heli, Greece.
- 2010: “Three Generations of Greek Painting”. “Chrysa” Gallery, Katerini, Greece.
- 2010: “Human Measures”. City of Athens Cultural Center. Athens, Greece.
- 18/6/2011- 2/8/2011: Special Group Exhibition: "Greek Painters of the 19th and 20th century". Regional Gallery of Arta "Yannis Moralis". Works of top 29 Greek artists of the 19th and 20th century
- 18/11/2011-20/11/2011: Group Exhibition. "Surprise 3". An exhibition for the support of the homeless people of Athens. artAZ, Municipality of Athens. Athens, Greece.
- Group Exhibition- Ersi Gallery, Athens. "Golden Age", 13/12/2012-12/01/2013
- Group Exhibition- S. G. Gallery, Athens. "Memories", 15/12/2012-19/1/2013
- Group Exhibition- Ersi Gallery, Athens, "Marriage", 4/3/2013-30/3/2013
- Group Exhibition- S.G.Art Gallery, Athens. “Memories”. 10/12/2013-18/01/2014
- Group Exhibition- S.G. Art Gallery, Athens. “ A journey with the full moon: from Athens to Andros”. 11/7-27/9/2014
- Group Exhibition- Chrysa Gallery, Katerini. “Eros from experience”. 13/12/2014-14/2/2015
- Group Exhibition- S.G.Art Gallery, Athens. “ The human form in the work of 30 Greek Artists”, 10-27/3/2015
- «Horizons». Scientific Organization « Together for Teen Health». Zappeion Manor 18/3/2017
- «Offer ΙΙ». Municipal Gallery of Agrinio. 3/4 – 4/6/2017
- Hommage à Hermann Hesse. Piraeus 1/6/2017, Calw, Germany 8-10/2017
- Cultural Center of Mykonos, Mykonos, Greece. 8/2017

== Main bibliography ==
- The Dictionary of Greek Artists: painters-sculptors- engravers. 16th- 20th century. Vol. 4. Melissa Publications. Athens.
- Foci of the Gaze: an exhibition of work by neo- representational artists. National Cultural Network of Cities. Ministry of Culture, Municipality of Larissa. Larissa, 1997.
- Greek arts and Collections. Hellenic Society for the Protection of the Environment and the Cultural Heritage. Christie's. Group exhibition and auction catalog. Athens, 1999.
- Art Conserva...tive. Orati, Eirini. In “EY” magazine, vol. 4. 10/2000. pp. 54–63
- Landscape and History in Archipelagos. Calendar 2003. Ministry of the Aegean. Athens, 2002.
- Oikade: Cretan Artists. Art group exhibition. Rethymnon Centre for Contemporary Art. Rethymnon, 2003 .
- Ten years touring around Greek art. Gerolymatos Group of Companies Publications. Athens, 2004.
- Iakhos: the chronicle of cosmopolitan Athens. Hatzifotiou, Zahos. Papadopoulou, Aggeliki (ed.). Fereniki Publications. Athens, 2006.
- Painters’ Aegina. Art group exhibition. Mikri Arktos Publications. Athens, 2008 .
- Art- life for the planet. Auction. Goulandris Natural History Museum. Athens, 2008.
- With Red or White, the wine bottles of a particular collection. Desmi Publications. Athens, 2009.
- It happened in Athens. Group exhibition. Mikri Arktos Publications. Cultural Organization of the Municipality of Athens. Athens, 2009.
- Brinies 2010. Art in the Farm. Art group exhibition. Kyriakidis Family Publications. Athens, 2010.
- Human Measures. Art group exhibition. Mikri Arktos Publications. Athens, 2010
