= Yiannis Psychopedis =

Greek artist

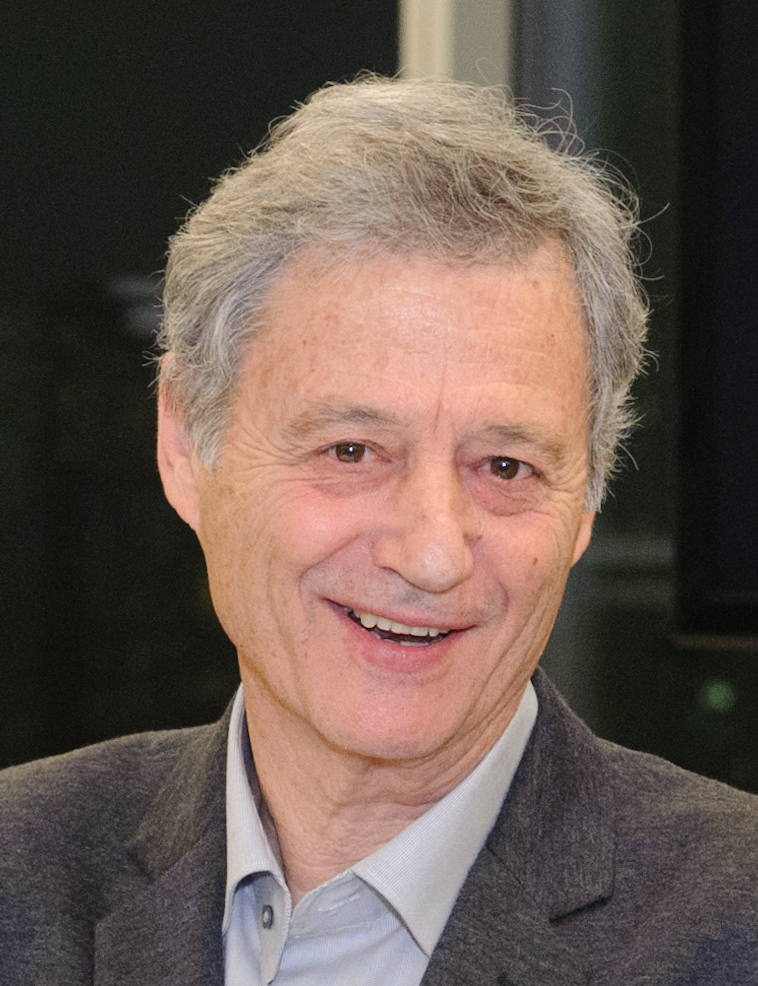
Yiannis Psychopedis, 2012

Υiannis Psychopedis (Greek: Γιάννης Ψυχοπαίδης [ˈʝanis psixoˈpeðis]; born 1945) is one of the main Greek exponents of artistic Critical Realism, an art movement that developed in Europe after the political and social upheavals of 1968. The May 68 student rebellions in France, the Prague Spring uprising in Czechoslovakia, and the coup d'état establishing the Greek military junta of 1967–1974 were catalysts for this group.

In the 1980s Psychopedis broached the subject matter of female nudes. The use of colour pencils, which create a 'fuzzy' visual impression, became characteristic of this period of his work. At the end of the decade, Psychopedis turned his attention to pastels and oils, exploring bright contrasts of pure colour in his work "Hommage a Vincent" .

A major touring exhibition of his works was hosted in German museums (1980–81), while the Academy of Arts in West Berlin organised a large solo exhibition in 1981. Since 1992, Psychopedis lives and works mainly in Greece and is a professor at the Athens School of Fine Arts.
