= Theon of Samos =

Greek painter

Theon of Samos (Ancient Greek: Θέων ὁ Σάμιος) was an ancient Greek painter during the era of Alexander the Great, is mentioned by Quintilian as a good artist of the second rank.

== Early career ==
If we may trust the somewhat flimsy stories told about him, his forte consisted in a lifelike, or perhaps, as Brunn puts it, a theatrical representation of action. His figures were said to start out of the picture. He chose such congenial subjects as the madness of Orestes, and a soldier rushing to battle. Another painter, Theorus, is mentioned, whom Brunn regards as identical with Theon.
