= Alexandros Tzannis =

Greek painter (born 1979)

Alexandros Tzannis (born 1979 in Athens) is a Greek painter. His work has been shown at the Künstlerhaus Bethanien in Berlin, Germany, the New Benaki Museum, Athens and the Macedonian Museum of Contemporary Art, Thessaloniki, Greece.

== Career ==
Tzannis graduated from the Athens School of Fine Arts. He is based in London and Athens.

He is represented by The Breeder gallery in Athens.

== Exhibitions ==
=== Selected solo shows ===
==== 2010 ====
- “Scattered Memories From the Next Millennium”, The Breeder Playroom, Athens

==== 2007 ====
- “Doomed by Fantasy”, The Breeder, Athens

=== Selected group exhibitions ===
==== 2010 ====
- Arrivals and Departures, Europe, Mole Vanvitelliana, Ancona curated by Andrea Bruciati and Walter Gasperoni

==== 2009 ====
- Heaven, 2nd Athens Biennial, Athens, curated by Nadia Argyropoulou
- Tape Modern 10, Tape Modern, Berlin
- Paint-ID, Macedonian Museum of Contemporary Art, Thessaloniki, curated by Sotiris Bahtetzis
- The first image, Centre Regional d'Art Contemporain Languedic Roussilion, Sète, France, curated by Denys Zacharopoulos,
- The Forgotten Bar Project, Open Space, Art Cologne, Cologne

==== 2008 ====
- "Ausländer in Berlin", Citric Gallery, Brescia, Italy curated by Margherita Belaief
- Forgotten Bar Project, Berlin

==== 2007 ====
- Stranger than Paradise, Galerie Charlotte Moser, Geneva, curated by Max Henry
- Topoi, works from the Collection of the State Museum of Contemporary Art, New Benaki Museum, Athens, curated by Dennis Zacharopoulos
- True Romance, The Breeder, Athens
- I sigxroni Elliniki Skini, Helexpo Garage, Athens, curated by Nadjia Argyropoulou
- Who's Here ? Macedonian Museum of Contemporary Art, and State Museum of Contemporary Art, curated by Dennis Zacharopoulos
- Gegen den Strich, Künstlerhaus Bethanien, Berlin, curated by Christoph Tannert and Valeria Schulte-Fischedick
- Degree Show, Athens School of Fine Arts

==== 2006 ====
- Art Basel Miami Beach (under the auspices of The Breeder )
- Art Forum Berlin, (under the auspices of The Breeder )
- What Remains is Future, Patras, Cultural Capital of Europe, curated by Nadja Argyropoulou
