= Spyros Koukoulomatis =

Greek painter (1917–1995)

Spyros Koukoulomatis (Σπύρος Κουκουλομάτης) (17 August 1917 – 21 October 1995) was a Greek painter.

== Biography ==
He was born in Athens in 1917 to a Greek father hailing from Mani, Peloponnesus, and a French-Swiss mother. He was initially a Piraeus inhabitant and then he moved to Cesariani, Athens, in 1963.

He studied at Elefthero Spoudastirio (Free Seminary) of Lucas Yeralis (1933-1938) and at the Athens School of Fine Arts (1936-1938).

He was a history of art professor at Hellenic Cinema and Television School Stavrakos-H.C.T.S.S for many years. He studied Philosophy and Sociology of Art and was always independent from galleries and art dealers.

== Work ==
Since 1951 he participated in more than fifty collective exhibitions in Greece and abroad. He held numerous personal exhibitions as well. Pieces of his artwork can be found at the Municipal Galleries of Piraeus and Kalamata, in private collections in the United States of America, Scotland, Switzerland, Sweden, Germany, Australia, Bulgaria and Greece.

Describing his work, the art critic Panos Panagiotouni once wrote "... he has a personal colour feast .. persistent devotion to the form, with compositions from mythology and everyday life."
