= Stelios Faitakis =

Greek painter and graffiti artist (1976–2023)

- Born: 1976; Athens, Greece
- Died: 6 October 2023 (aged 47); Athens, Greece
- Known for: Painting; Graffiti art
- Website: steliosfaitakis.com

Stelios Faitakis (Greek: Στέλιος Φαϊτάκης; 1976 – 6 October 2023) was a Greek painter and graffiti artist.

== Early years and education ==
Faitakis was born in Athens, Greece in 1976. He followed a one-year course, 1996–1997, at Salonica University's School of Visual and Applied Arts, and then enrolled and studied at the Athens School of Fine Arts, taking the course of hagiography and graduating in 2003. During his years at the art schools and later on, he also took courses in elementary Osteopathy, in Qigong, and in Chinese medicine.

== Career ==
Faitakis began as a graffiti artist, in the 1990s, becoming known in the capital for his works, which he signed with the pseudonym “Bizare.” He started painting by the early 2000s and took part in the Athens Biennale of 2007. His mural Socrates drinking the hemlock brought him to the attention of art critics and a wider audience. He staged his first solo exhibition, titled Occupational Hazard, in 2008, offering, as one reviewer remarked, a "marriage of urban-culture elements with the religious vocabulary of the Byzantine tradition."

In 2011, the Danish pavilion in the Venice Biennale, featured eighteen artists exhibiting under the theme "Speech Μatters", about freedom of expression in Europe. Among the exhibits was Faitakis' "grand, anthropocentric mural," titled "Imposition Symphony". The six-part mural was not preserved after the Biennale ended. The following year, curator David Elliott invited Faitakis to take part in an exhibition staged at Kyiv, in Ukraine, where the artist presented a 7 m high and 16m long work.

Poster for the Kori film (2013)

In 2013, he designed the poster for the Thanos Anastopoulos film Kori ("Daughter") that participated at the Berlin Film Festival.

Faitakis' works have been exhibited in various places, such as at the Los Angeles, California 2011 Art in the Street group show; in Turin's Palazzo Benso di Cavour, Italy, at the Shit and Die show; in Kassel, Germany, at the 2017 Temple show; at the Riboca 2018 Biennale in Riga, Lithuania; in the National Museum of Modern Art as part of Documenta 14, in 2018; in Japan's Palais de Tokyo, in 2016, where his mural Lasco Project #6 became a permanent display; and elsewhere.

== Style and reviews ==
Faitakis was said to be one of the "pioneers" of the Greek street art movement in the mid-1990s. His paintings were characterized by numerous allusions and an "intensive use" of the gold and silver colors, inspired by the hagiography and painting in general during Byzantine times. - a reminiscence of Byzantine icon painting. Presenting Faitakis' book, Brunswick Bound editions described his "perspectives [as] unsettling" and his content "provocative," adding that "his images juxtapose Medusa-headed giraffes with skateboarders riding waves of destruction or religious martyrs and bizarre gangsters with suffering lovers. Violence, death, and destruction lay siege to his apocalyptic landscapes."

In his own words, he drew inspiration from the works of such painters as José Clemente Orozco, Diego Rivera, and Mexican street art, while he also admired European artists like Brughel and Hieronymus Bosch, and also modern ones such as Neo Rauch and his themes of "industrial alienation."

Most of all, however, Faitakis was assessed as being primarily interested in "everyday life" in "modern Greece."

== Death ==
Faitakis died on 6 October 2023, at the age of 47.

His brother, Yannis Faitakis, in an online post mourning the loss, wrote that Stelios, following a defective birth, did not have full use of both hands, using mainly his left one to draw and paint, yet was still able to play the mandolin and create his large canvases. Stelios Faitakis was laid to rest in Crete, which is the place of origin of his family.
