= Yannis Stavrou =

Greek painter (born 1948)

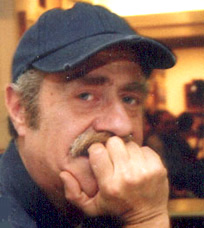
- Yannis Stavrou.
- Born: Yannis Michail Stavrou; June 21, 1948 (age 77); Athens, Greece
- Education: School of Fine Arts, Athens, Greece
- Known for: Painting, Drawing, Sculpture
- Movement: Post Impressionism

Yannis Stavrou (born June 21, 1948, in Greece) is a contemporary Greek artist, painter.

Yannis Stavrou (Γιάννης Σταύρου in Greek) was born in Thessaloniki, Greece. He originally studied sculpture at the Athens School of Fine Arts before painting won him over. He currently lives and works in Athens.

He has done thirty one solo shows and participates in group exhibitions. His landscapes and seascapes are not classical in style as the sea is just a motive for his colour palette while the shapes of his ships are more conceptual and impressionist than figurative.

After a period of involvement in a form of "modern academism" he is now going through a new stage, in which the form becomes more abstract, but the method of painting and the technique of paint and brush follow strictly the old classic methods.

To the brush intervenes the knife in numerous layers of colour; in contradiction to the mat effect in his older work, his recent paintings are glistening - this enhances strongly the richness and the real texture of the oil colour (oil painting).

== Art criticism ==
The art historian, critic Manos Stefanidis wrote about Yannis Stavrou’s work in 2006 (excerpt from the essay under the title "Glass Eyes, Resurrected Gazes - On Yannis Stavrou's Paintings" by Manos Stefanidis):

“I see his paintings as a challenge for an inner voyage, an opportunity for a resurrection of the gaze - a prolongation of real life. His compositions are structured around two opposite poles: tenderness and a sturdy rhythm; a sense for detail and understanding of the whole; a kind of sentimental escape to mirthful images, as Kosmas Politis would put it, and a preoccupation with form, represented in an unadorned and solid fashion. His paintings keep alive the memory of those places he fell in love with in the past or create novel seas for new journeys. Here plasticity is achieved via abstractive processes, and elsewhere a tiny light - one catalytic brushstroke - unveils a well-hidden secret. His heavy blues are electrified with orange iridescences and his reds never leave his blacks or dark greens unaccompanied.”

Dr Manos Biris, Professor of the Architecture History in the National Technical University of Athens (NTUA), wrote about Yannis Stavrou in 2000 (excerpt from the introduction to Yannis Stavrou's catalog under the title "Greece in Colours", 2000):

"Yannis Stavrou is a painter who touches upon the city's metaphysical tissue. An offspring himself of the lucky generation, which witnessed the historical heart-rending moments of Greek urban centers, and more closely so in his city of Thessaloniki, he takes us by the hand, striding with confident strokes back to our legendary childhood evoked by his images; deep down into the bottomless hollow of Thermaikos harbour, where the massive metal shapes of ships are hovering all aloof, emerging through the midst of cracking-dawn's fog."
