= Vangelis Vlahos =

Greek artist

Vangelis Vlahos (born 1971) is a Greek artist. Born in 1971 in Athens and studied at the Manchester Metropolitan University in England and Athens School of Fine Arts, Vlahos' works have appeared in private and public collections including Tate Modern in London, the Magasin III Museum & Foundation for Contemporary Art in Stockholm, Sweden, the National Museum of Contemporary Art, Athens, and the Teixeira de Freitas Collection in Lisbon.

== Style ==
Vlahos often uses subtle sarcasm to formulate meanings, identification mechanisms and ideologies. For instance, in his 2012 archive-spaced work, Foreign Archeologist from Standing to Bending Position, images are created in a sequential movement based on each archeologist's body posture. Karaba praised him saying, "his factual use of image and metaphorical titles, reversed and parodies the bio-political process of subjection performed by archival and akin apparatuses." In his own words, he makes art as "a way of dealing with an event and to activate it in a contemporary context".

== Works ==
Vlahos began exploring the post-dictatorship political history of Greece during the 2000s. His The renovation of the former parliament in Sarajevo by the Greek State (1992) deals with the role of Greece in the Balkans. The archive is displayed along two Parliament building architectural models: one, from discovered images from the Internet picturing the building before renovation, and the other, from the original architectural drawings from the construction company in charge of the renovation.
