= Theocharis Mores =

Greek painter

Theocharis Mores (Greek: Θεοχάρης Μορές, 4 February 1927 – 1992) was a Greek painter.

== Biography ==
Born in Saint Croix, he was the eldest of five children. Mores started working in the accounts office of the factory in which his father was employed. The owners of this factory helped him enter the Sivitanidios Crafts and Vocational School.

Mores was strongly influenced by his uncle on his mother's side, Charalambos Potamianos. Potamianos introduced him to Vasilios Yermenis who gave Mores a few painting lessons without charging him a fee.

Mores took on various jobs in his youth. One that influenced him greatly was that of assistant to a goldsmith jewellery maker, a job which he kept even after being admitted to the School of Fine Arts.

Mores married Mary Theotokas in 1961. He later met and was sponsored by Swiss art lover Elisabeth Salzmann, who financed his journeys to Paris in 1964. He travelled to Venice, Madrid, London and galleries in the Netherlands.

Mores's works were exhibited in the Panhellenic Exhibitions of 1963, 1965, 1969, and 1971.

In 1965 he took part in the Quadriennale Europa in Rome, and in 1973 his work was exhibited at the Trittle Gasse gallery in Zürich, together with that of painter Lili Weber. In 1974 he was awarded the fourth prize at Cercle International d'Art Contemporain, Galerie Riviera, Nice. In 1975 he exhibited in the same centre, this time winning 3rd prize.

Theocharis Mores died in Athens of a heart attack in 1992.
