= Mirka Yemendzakis =

Mirka Yemendzakis (Greek: Μίρκα Γιεμεντζάκη) (died August 2, 2013) was a Greek actress, musician, voice coach and director based at the National Theatre of Greece in Athens. She collaborated with Peter Brook, Peter Oskarson, and Robert Wilson, as well as eight years with Peter Stein at the Berliner Schaubühne.

== Bibliography ==
- Jedes Kind Kann Singen (with Michaela Hefele) (ISBN 9783764926458)
