= Nikos Sofialakis =

Greek sculptor (1914–2002)

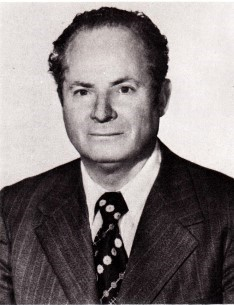
Sofialakis Portrait Photo

Nikos Sofialakis (Greek: Νίκος Σοφιαλάκης: 1914–2002) was a prominent 20th century Greek sculptor, best known for his characteristic style of Classical Realism.

== Early years ==
Nikos Sofialakis was born in Erfous, Rethymnon, Crete, Greece in 1914 and died in Athens, Greece in 2002. At the age of ten he came to Athens and from 1925–1937 he apprenticed under the neoclassical sculptor Georgios Bonanos. He continued his training with a scholarship from the Athina Stathatou Legacy Foundation, (without which he would not have been able to study during the German occupation of Greece in WWII), entering the Athens School of Fine Arts of the National Technical University of Athens in 1938, where he studied under the sculptor and Professor Michalis Tombros. During the course of his studies he received four recognitions and two first place awards.

Sofialakis began charting his artistic course while still a student at the Athens School of Fine Arts, participating in the 1940 Pan-Hellenic Artists Exhibition at the Zappeion with his plaster study “Head of Youth”, and taking part in various other group exhibitions, such as the ‘Professional’ Exhibition at the National Archaeological Museum of Athens (with contemporaries Efthymiades, Kefallinos, Nicolas, Katraki, et al.), the Parnassos Exhibitions of 1944, 1945, 1946 and the French Academy Exhibition of 1946 among others.

=== Maternity ===
In his final year at the Athens School of Fine Arts, Sofialakis won the 1944 First Prize in Sculpture with his diploma presentation Maternity, a terracotta study of a mother nursing her child in miniature size. The monetary award came at a crucial juncture in the artist’s development, enabling him to purchase his own atelier in the post-WWII period which allowed him to embark on the first steps of his artistic career.

== The Emerging Artist ==
=== The Works Child of the Occupation, Defender and El Greco ===
At the 1945 Parnassos Exhibition, Sofialakis met the great Cretan author, Nikos Kazantzakis, who was so impressed with the artist that he visited his atelier twice. “I entrust to you my two ideas, that you might write them out in marble – the ‘Enslaved Greek Child’ and the ‘Execution Pole of Agia’”, Kazantzakis told the Artist upon his second visit to his atelier, during which he commissioned Sofialakis for the monumental works Child of the Occupation and Defender (the Execution Pole of Agia). “ […] The pole of Agia was a large oak where the Germans tied their hostages and executed them one by one. Most of the shots are at heart level, so the wood is close to snapping there. […] This second one [idea] is my Christ and my God; 480 Cretans perished on it, taken as hostages from the fields. Can you make it so that freedom breaks free from this pole? Do it, and I will set the work at my own expense.” Sofialakis ‘wrote out in marble’ both works, which would become two of his greatest compositions and emblematic visions of the Greek post-war era.

=== The Grekisk Konst Exhibition of the Royal Swedish Academy of Fine Arts and the Cairo International Exhibition ===
By the close of the 1940s, Sofialakis began to travel and to participate in some of the most noteworthy artistic events of the period, establishing himself as one of the most prominent Greek artists, and perhaps, as art critic G. Marmarides noted, the most "authentic Greek artist of his time". In 1947 Sofialakis participated in two of the most significant, international artistic events of the decade: The Grekisk Konst Exhibition of the Royal Swedish Academy of Fine Arts and the Cairo Biennale (Cairo International Exhibition). Between April and May 1947, Sofialakis presented his work in the prestigious Grekisk Konst Exhibition (Exhibition of Greek Artists) which was organized by the Royal Swedish Academy of Fine Arts and which was held in Sweden, Denmark and Norway. His marble high-relief Mother and Child earned him the first prize in Oslo (of the Stockholm, Copenhagen and Oslo Exhibitions), and received much coverage by the press that had begun to recognize in him the emerging artist. In the fall of the same year, Sofialakis participated in the Cairo International Exhibition (1947) with the works Defender (which had been inspired and proposed by Nikos Kazantzakis), Babe with Bonnet, and Twins which also received numerous distinctions and which were featured in the print media of the day. Sofialakis returned to Greece, having secured the first stage in his international – and national – recognition as an artist.

By the 1948 Pan-Hellenic Artists Exhibition, Sofialakis’ prominence as a new artist was growing, and his works Mother and Child, Cretan Head, Head of the Aeginitissa Kore, and Babe with Bonnet were well-received by the viewing public. His Mother and Child and Babe with Bonnet were already receiving praise owing to their presentation in international exhibitions, and the Aeginitissa Kore, a Maiden’s head in limestone, was purchased by the National Bank of Greece. His growing popularity led to his being commissioned by the municipality of Herakleion for his El Greco, the super-scale marble bust of the great Cretan painter, Domenikos Theotokopoulos, which was set at Freedom Square (now Domenikos Theotokopoulos Square) in Herakleion, Crete on July 6, 1949.

== Recognition and acclaim ==
It was not until the 1952 Pan-Hellenic Artists Exhibition at the Zappeion, however, that Sofialakis received his ‘big break’, participating with the pieces Twins, Satyr, Penelope, and Maternity. His marble bust, Twins, was already well known owing to its distinction at the 1947 Cairo Biennale, and his heads Satyr and Penelope received extensive praise, in both, the domestic and foreign press. It was owing to his masterpiece Maternity, however, that Sofialakis received his great opportunity: the natural-scale statue in black granite, based on the 1944 terracotta study that had earned him the first prize in sculpture, drew the attention of the sovereigns King Paul and Queen Frederica, who, having observed Sofialakis’ works on display, requested a private viewing at his atelier. This private viewing proved a great success for Sofialakis, who saw his Maternity subsequently purchased by the Bank of Greece and donated to the Alexandras Maternity Hospital of Athens at the behest of Queen Frederica in 1952, and who, moreover, was personally selected by the Queen to sculpt her marble portrait, for which she posed in person at his atelier. The bust was completed in 1954 and set at the Queen’s School of Midwifery in Athens and Sofialakis, at just forty years old, had established himself as the preferred artist of the archons and important personas of the country. Some of his most celebrated portrait sculpture includes such notable figures as the Prime Ministers Eleftherios Venizelos (195-), Nicholaos Plastiras (1950) and Sophocles Venizelos (1964), Princess Alexandra (1954), and Dr. George Papanikolaou (1962), many of whom sat for him in person at his atelier.

== The Established Artist ==
By the 1960s, Sofialakis had entered his most productive period, during which he worked ardently both, within Greece, and abroad where he traveled extensively. The decade opened with his participation in the 1960 Pan-Hellenic Artists Exhibition at the Zappeion with his statue Kore with Grapes, hailed by many critics as the artist’s grand opus; this is also the period of his monumental work, The Battle of Crete, a composition memorializing the eponymous World War II battle, and the height of his success in the United States, to which he traveled twice, by formal invitation to present his works.

=== The Exhibitions in the United States ===
In 1967, Sofialakis was invited to the United States to participate in the Fine Arts Festival of Mediterranean Countries in New York where he presented his exhibition, entitled, The Gods of Greece, a theme consisting of 70 marble pieces featuring Ancient Greek mythological motifs. His work was publicized at great length in print, radio, and television, earning him great praise for his work, such that the Metropolitan Museum of Art requested his assistance with the restoration of antiquities on exhibit at the museum.

At the conclusion of his visit to the United States, Sofialakis was received by his academic colleagues at the University of Louisville, Kentucky, where he was presented with the University Medal in admiration and recognition of his work. In 1970, Sofialakis traveled to the United States a second time, to present his works in the Fine Arts Festivals held in Virginia and Colorado. His first exhibition, held at the Atheneaum Museum of the Northern Virginia Fine Arts Association, received great coverage, and Sofialakis continued his successful tour in Denver, Colorado, where he was distinguished by the Governor of Colorado, John Love (1970) for his contribution to Art.

=== The Battle of Crete ===
Between his exhibitions to the United States, Sofialakis worked on one of the most significant compositions of his career, which began to take shape in 1968, when the leader of the National Resistance in Crete during World War II, General “Kapetan” Manolis Badouvas, commissioned Sofialakis to memorialize the epic Battle of Crete. Sofialakis researched the subject for six months before unveiling his Battle of Crete in June 1969, an 18m long x 0,90m high marble depiction of the famous battle. His monumental composition, which was set as the metope of the Cretan National Resistance Memorial Museum in Heraklion, Crete, founded by General Badouvas, was applauded by the press that was now following the artist’s career closely, owing to his national – and international - successes.

=== Germany and Austria ===
At the onset of the 1970s, Sofialakis had traveled abroad extensively and had just presented his works in the United States; this time he would go on to present his works in Europe. His impressive exhibition at Gallery Agapi in Blankeneser, Hamburg, Germany in 1975 inaugurated the Gallery, the marble crest of which bears his design, while his presentation during the Portrait of Greek Artists Exhibition in Vienna, Austria in 1980-1981 was a resounding success.

== Influence and contribution ==
Sofialakis participated in every Pan-Hellenic Artists Exhibition from 1940–1975, earning acclaim for his work in Greece and abroad, and produced vigorously until, and throughout, the 1980s. His creative impetus spanned five decades, during which time he negotiated the full range of artistic subjects and themes. Though many of his works were commissioned portrait pieces, Sofialakis’ love for children, who frequently figured as his subject matter, as is apparent in the works Babe With Bonnet (1943), The Bound Babe (1946), Mother and Child (1947), The Twins (1947), and Maternity (1952), rendered him a master of the infant form in marble. His greatest devotion, however, was to Greek mythology, and it is here that the most prolific output of his work lies.

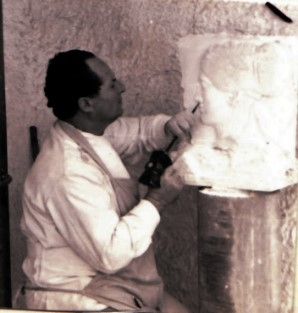
Sofialakis sculpting Goddess Demeter Relief

His Odysseus, a high-relief in Pendelic marble was presented by the University of Athens to Queen Sophia of Spain (then Princess of Greece) in 1962 on the occasion of her wedding, while his characteristic micro-sculpture in marble featuring Greek mythological motifs attracted collectors from all over the world, with many of his works now found in museums and private collections in Stockholm, Copenhagen, Oslo, Cairo, Frankfurt, Vienna, Paris, London, Sydney, Korea, and the United States.

Sofialakis synthesized two very distinct modes in his art, bearing the influence of his great maestro, Bonanos and his professor at the School of Fine Arts, Tombros. From the former, he gleaned the sculpting techniques characteristic of the Canova School, in which Bonanos had received his training; from the latter, he discovered the modernist impulse in the manner of Maillol, who had influenced Tombros during his studies in Paris. The resulting style of classical realism was wholly unique to Sofialakis, who used his erudition and creativity to bridge the gaping divide between rationality and pathos in his work. Sofialakis would continue to honor the tradition of the Atelier method by which he had been trained, in receiving students and apprentices without charge throughout the course of his lifetime.

In 2004 the family of the late artist inaugurated the Nikos Sofialakis Center of Neoclassical Sculpture, built on the exact location of the original atelier at 21 Taxilou Street, Athens, Greece. The new Center is a private, not-for-profit research center and exhibition hall dedicated to the life and works of Nikos Sofialakis, and is open to the public without charge. In 2010, the family established the Nikos Sofialakis Scholarship Award in honor of the principles of Apprenticeship and Scholarship that so profoundly influenced the Artist's life and his contribution to his craft.
