= Ioannis Permeniates =

Greek painter (died 1550)

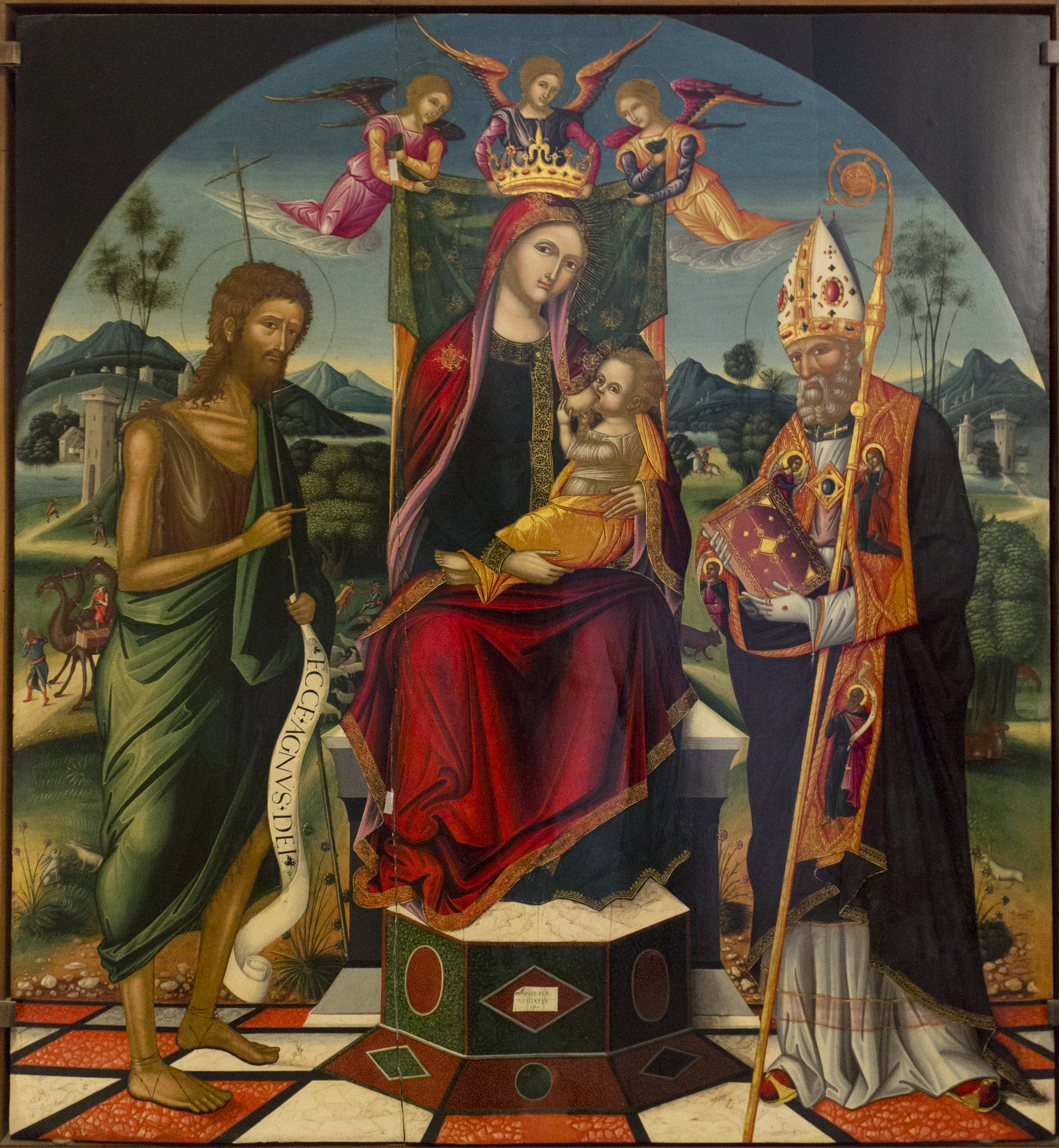
- Madonna and Child enthroned with St. John the Baptist and St. Augustine
- Born: 1480–1500; Crete or Venice
- Died: 1550
- Movement: Italian Renaissance; Cretan school

Ioannis Permeniates (Greek: Ιωάννης Περμενιάτης; died 1550) also known as Giovanni Permeniate, Joannes Permeniates or Zuan Permeniatis, was a Greek painter active in Venice during the early 16th century. His most popular painting is The Virgin and Child Enthroned. He was an icon painter who attempted to escape the maniera greca. His icons exhibit qualities of both Venetian and Cretan styles. Exhibiting a more refined maniera greca, he eschews the simplicity of Duccio and Cimabue, and adds more space to his paintings.

== History ==
Ioannis Permeniates was probably born in Crete and migrated to Venice. Not much is known about the painter. An archive in Venice indicates that he was a member of the local Greek community in the city. The painter signed some of his icons ΧΕΙΡ ΙΩ(ΑΝΝ)ΟΥ ΤΟΥ ΠΕΡΜΕΝΙΩΤ(ΟΥ) by the hand of Ioannis Permeniotis. His famous piece Virgin Enthroned with St. John the Baptist and St. Augustine was signed with Latin capitals: IOANES PERMENIATES/ P.. The painting is housed in the Museo Civico Correr in Venice. Permeniatis also painted: Saint Peter, Saint Francis, and Saint Dominic, which is located in the art museum in Vicenza.

== Gallery ==
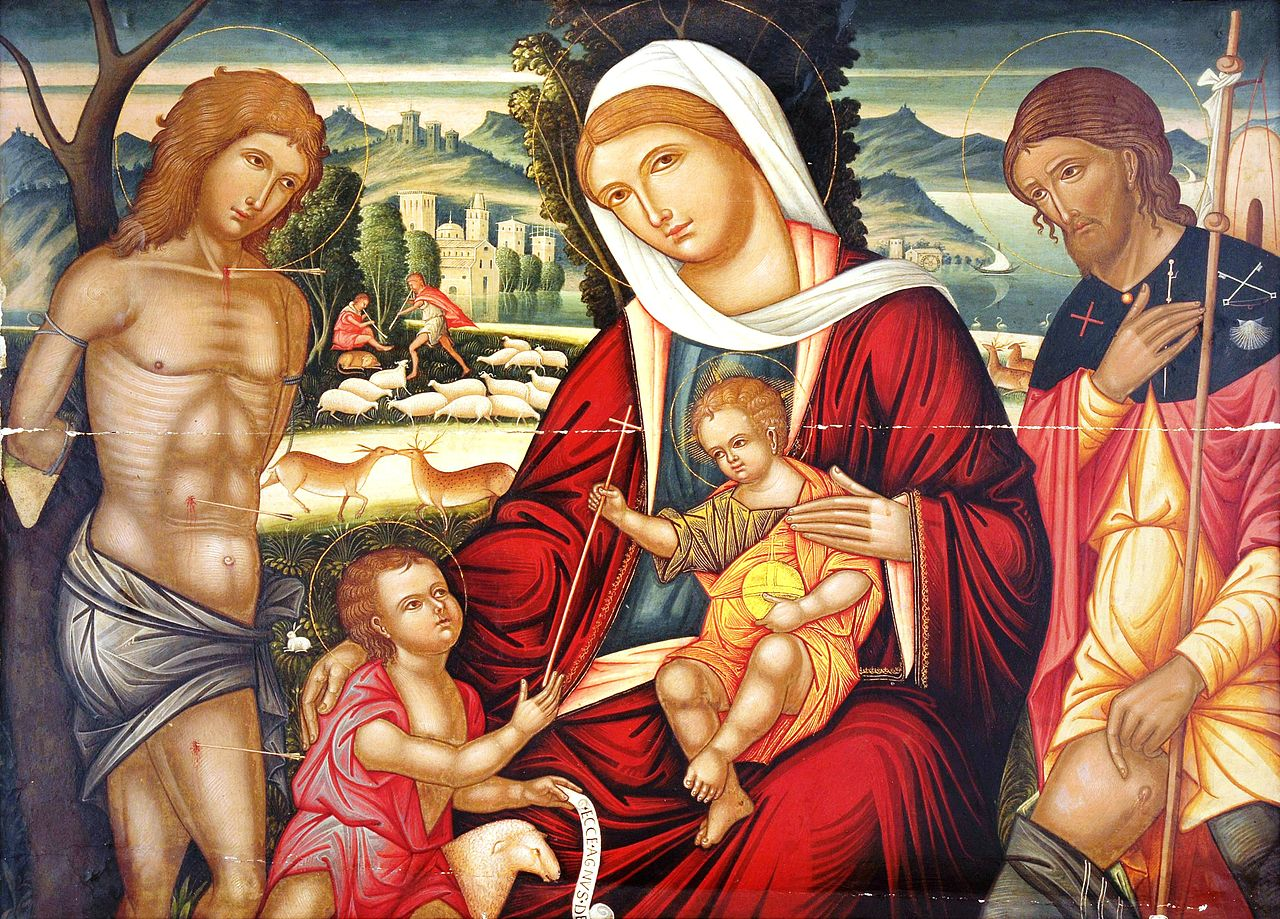
Madonna and Child and Saints

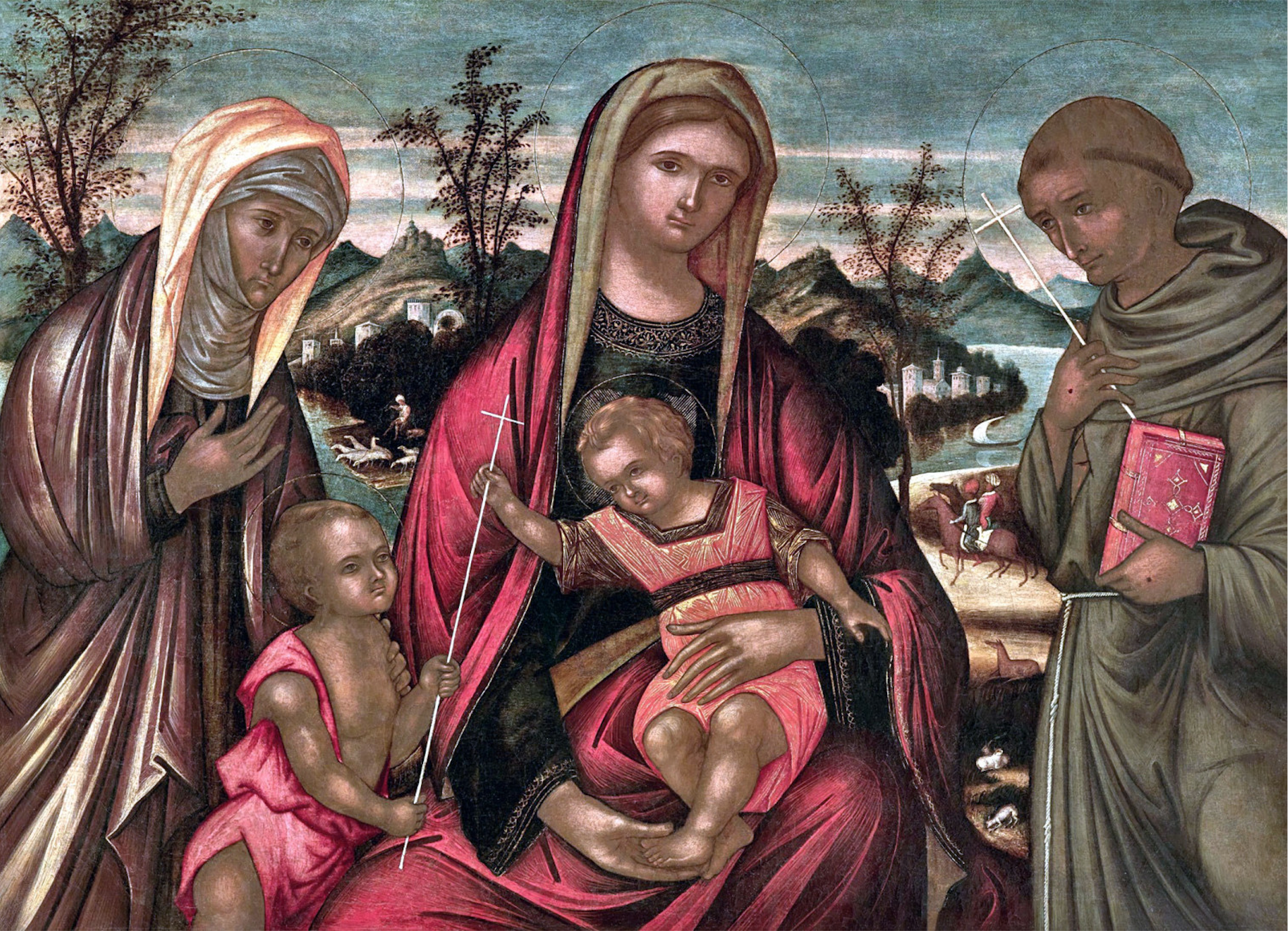
Madonna and Child

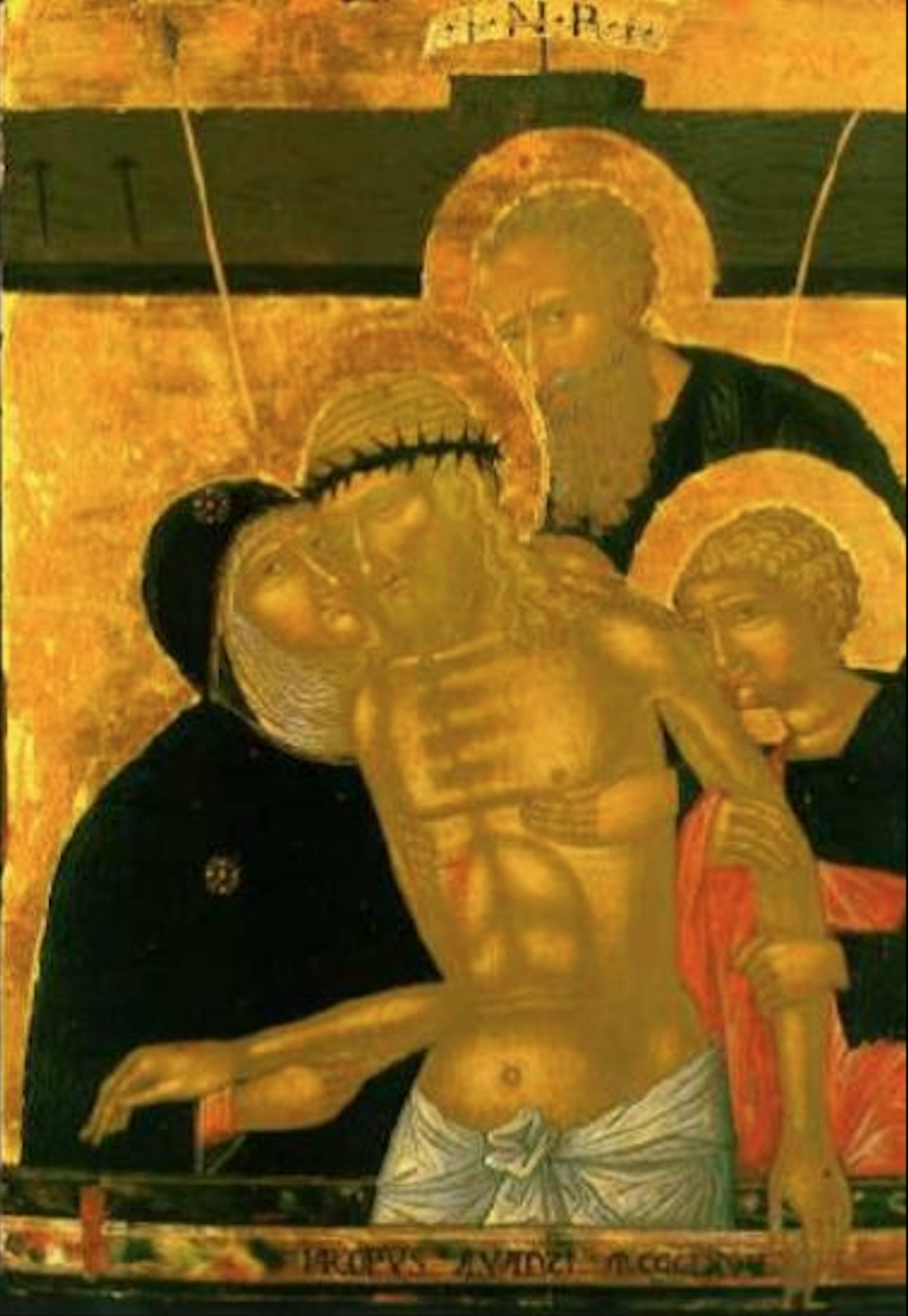
Pieta

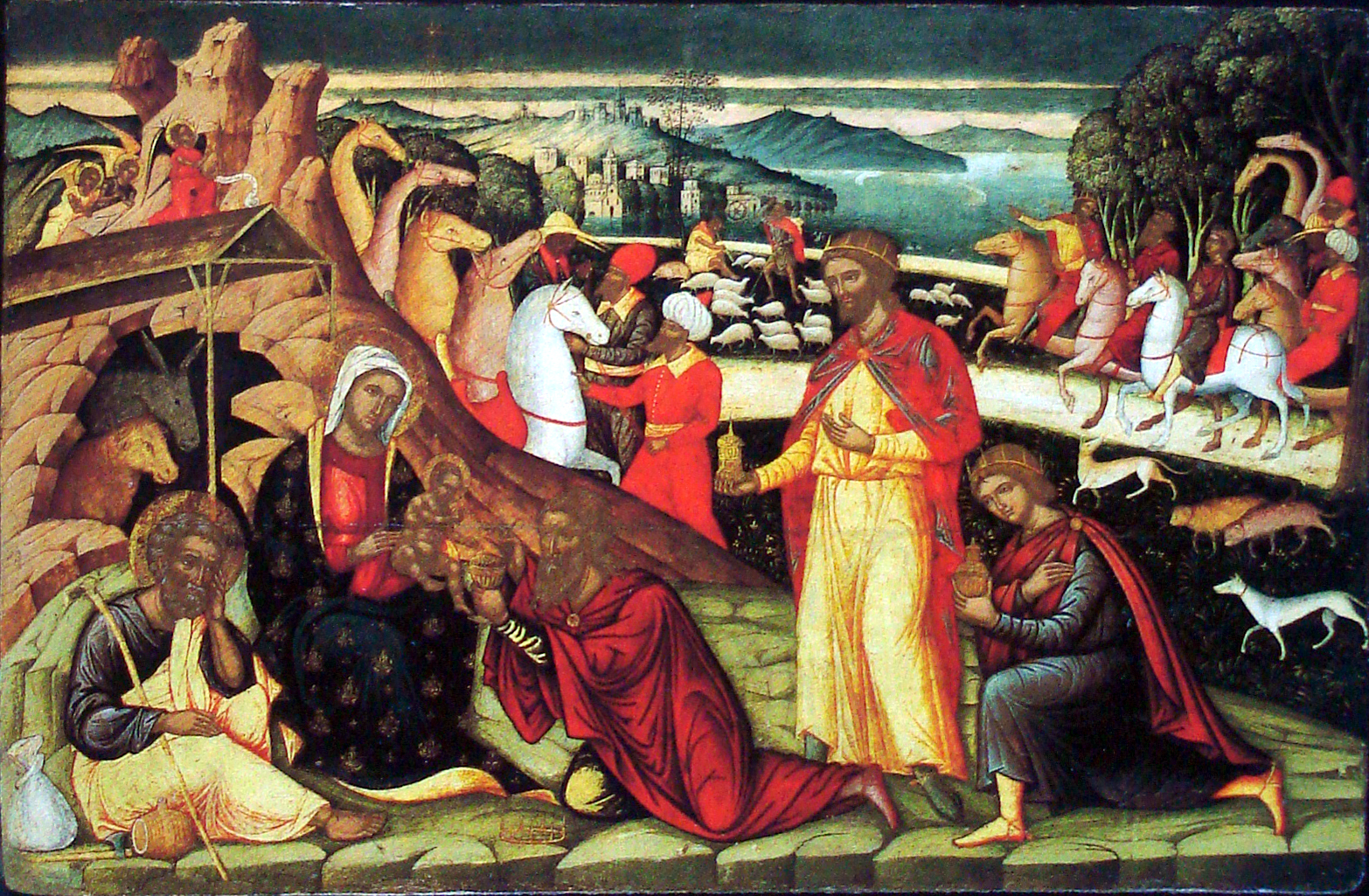
The Adoration of the Magi

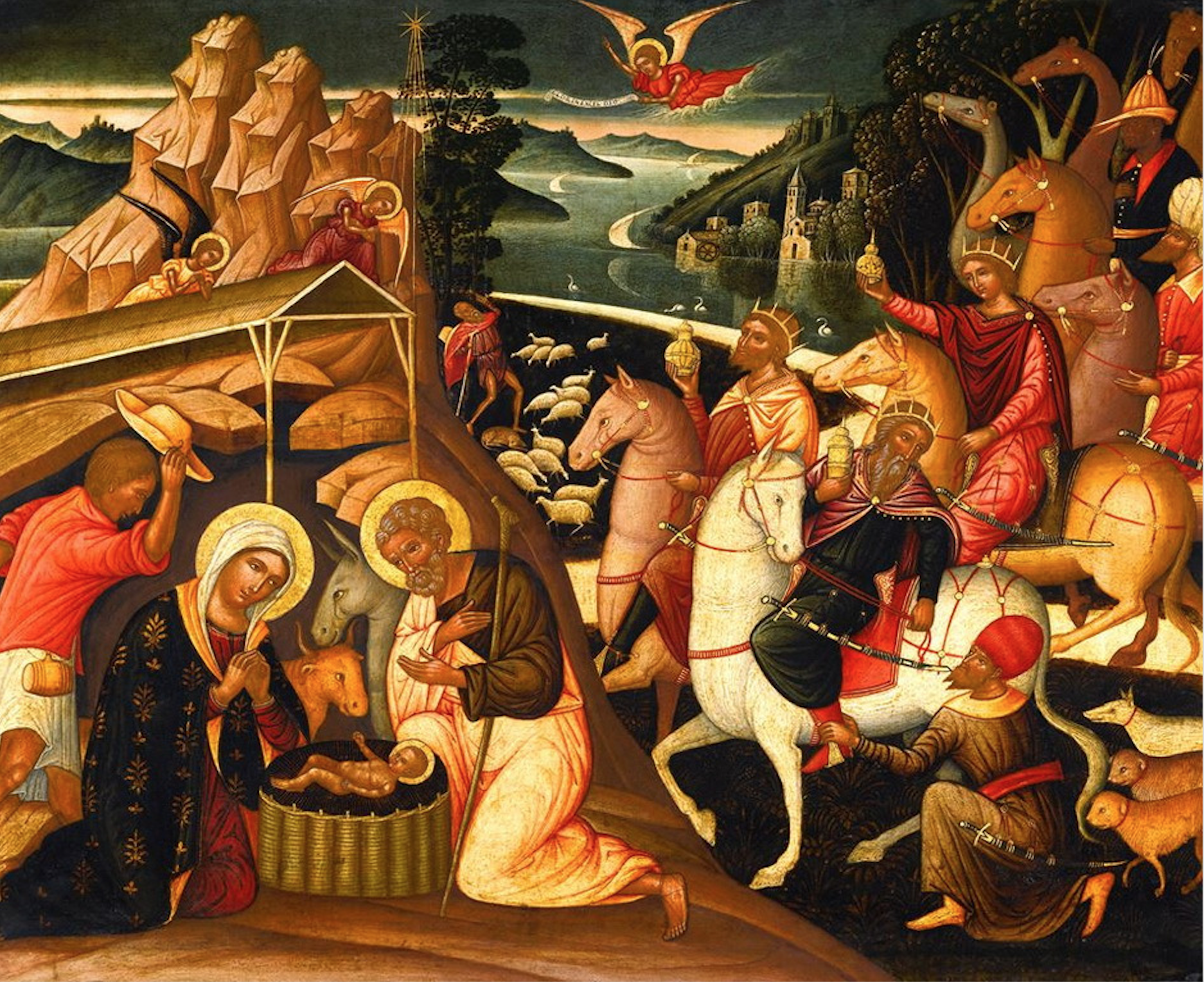
The Three Magi

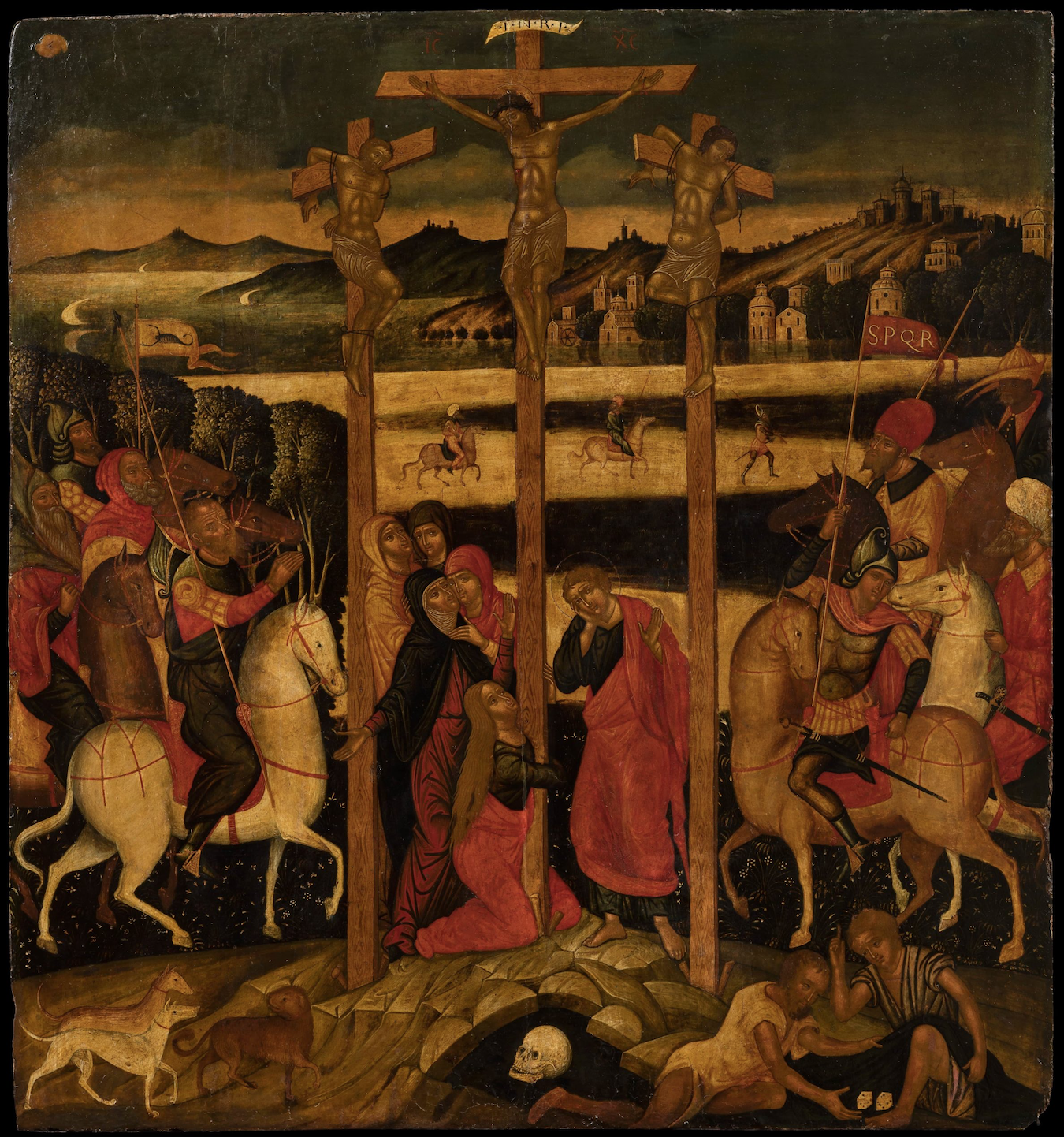
Crucifixion of Jesus

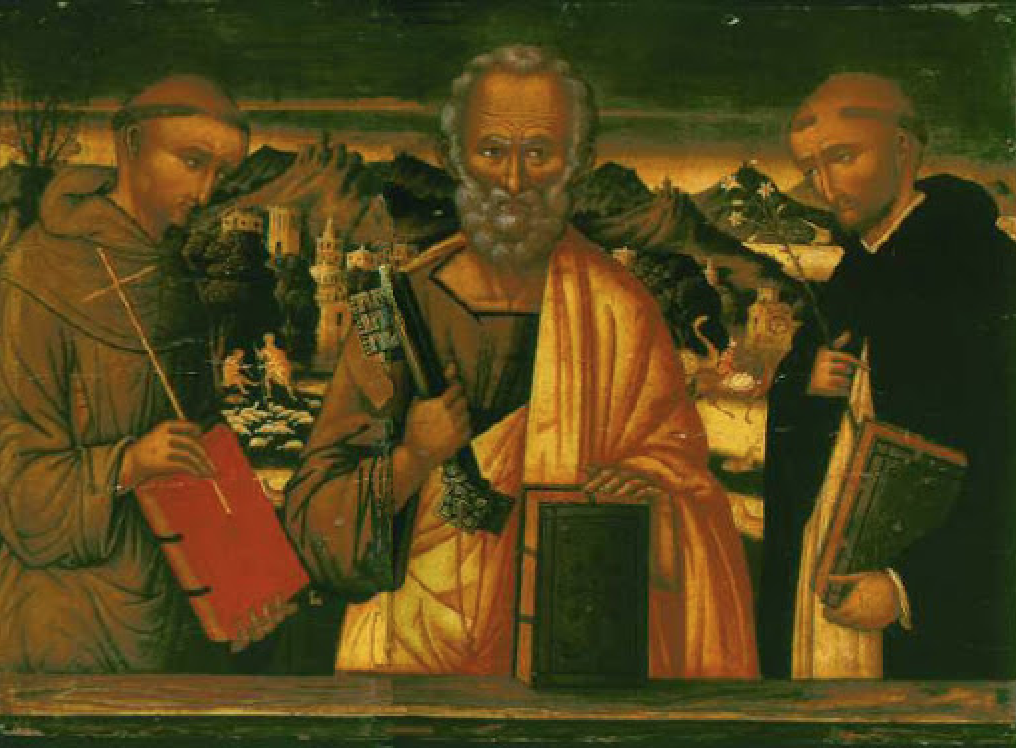
Saint Peter, Saint Francis, and Saint Dominic

== Notable works ==
- Madonna and Child enthroned with St. John the Baptist and St. Augustine (Permeniates)

== See also ==
- Greek scholars in the Renaissance
- Fra Angelico
- Giotto di Bondone
- Victor (painter)
- Marco Basaiti
