= Victor (painter) =

Greek painter (died 1555)

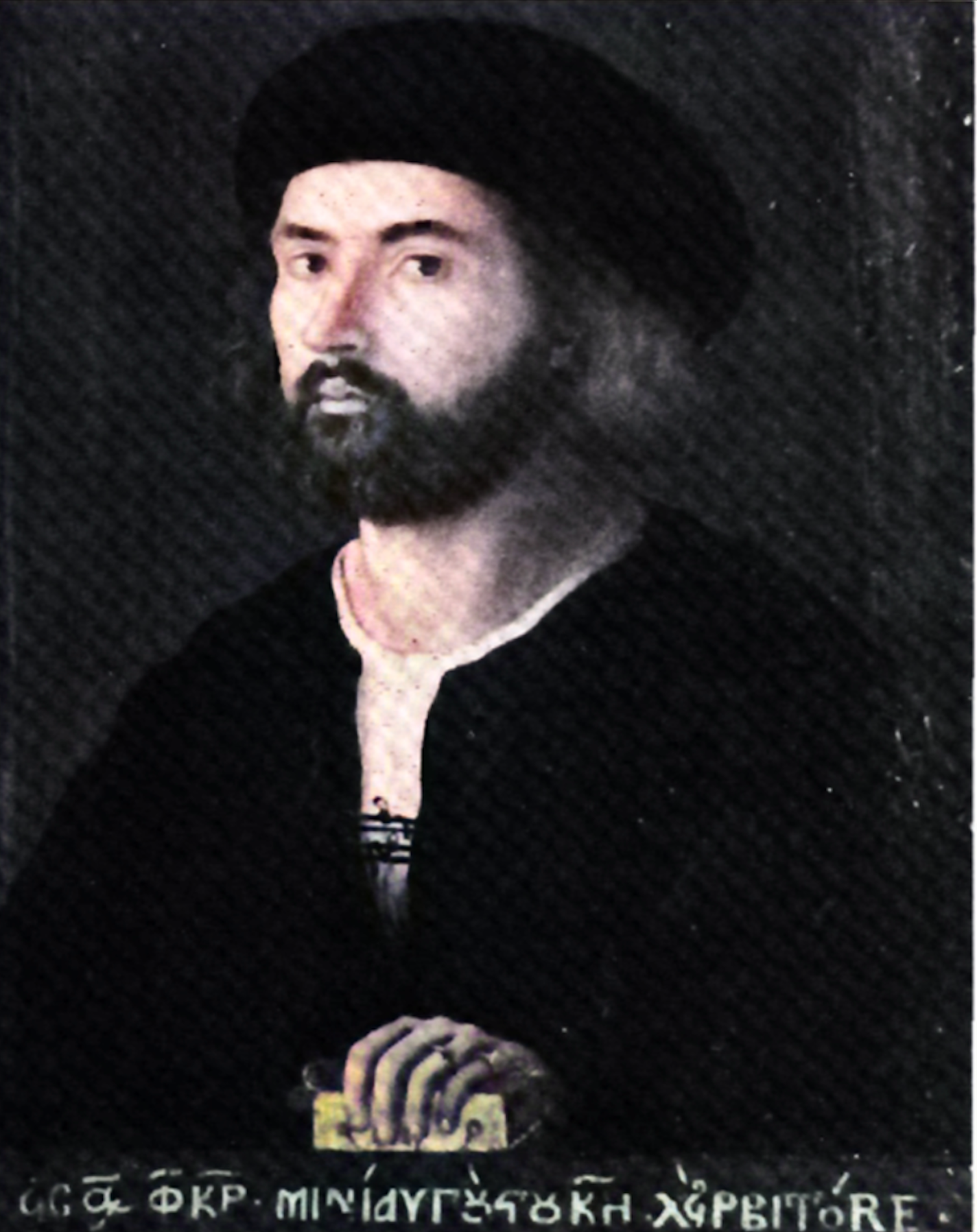
- Self-portrait
- Born: Crete or Venice
- Died: 1555
- Movement: Italian Renaissance

Victor (Greek: Βίκτωρ; died 1555) was a Greek painter active in Venice active during the mid-16th century. The only surviving painting is his self portrait. He was a painter during the High Renaissance. He drastically escaped the maniera greca. He is comparable to Ioannis Permeniates.

== History ==
Victor was probably born in Venice or Crete. His father's name was Ioannis. In 1537, he was chosen by the Venetian authorities to fight in the Third Ottoman-Venetian War. He made out a will on July 10, 1537, the will begins: Ego Victor filius q. ser Johannis Greci, pictor de Conflnio Sancii Musis, iturum in classem. In 1539, O Vetto depentor was a soldier until 1540. On July 15, 1555, Victor the painter and son of Ioannis was a member of the church of Saint Moses. In the archives, it stated that Vettorello depentor died. The painting is in Giustiniani-Reganati collection in Venice. The painting is signed ΕΙΣ ΑΦΚΖ' ΜΙΝΙ ΑΥΓΟΥΣΤΟΥ ΚΗ, ΧΕΙΡ βΙΤΟΡΕ

== See also ==
- Greek scholars in the Renaissance
- Vittore Carpaccio
- Giovanni Bellini
- Victor (iconographer)
- Marco Basaiti

== Bibliography ==
- Hatzidakis, Manolis (1987). Έλληνες Ζωγράφοι μετά την Άλωση (1450-1830). Τόμος 1: Αβέρκιος - Ιωσήφ [Greek Painters after the Fall of Constantinople (1450-1830). Volume 1: Averkios - Iosif]. Athens: Center for Modern Greek Studies, National Research Foundation. ISBN 960-7916-01-8.
