= Katerina Grolliou =

Greek artist

- Κατερίνα Γρόλλιου
- Born: 1957 or 1958; Athens, Greece
- Died: 2017 (aged 59); Florence, Italy

Katerina Grolliou (Greek: Κατερίνα Γρόλλιου) was a Greek artist, who was born in Athens and died in Florence, Italy, in 2017, aged 59. She designed and produced handmade jewellery, microsculpture, painting in relief, and poetry. Examples of her work are held in the collections of the Academy of Fine Arts in Florence, the Athens Municipality Cultural Centre, and the Corfu Municipal Gallery, and were included in two publications, Greek Jewellery: 5000 Years of Tradition and Greek Jewellery: 6000 Years of Tradition.

== Life and work ==
Katerina Grolliou was born in Athens. She studied painting, microsculpture and jewellery design at the Academy of Fine Arts in Florence and worked under the tutorship of the sculptor Magni Egisto. She later pursued her studies of art and jewellery in Paris and Seoul.

In 1990 Katerina Grolliou established an atelier in Athens, "Atelier GROLLIO", where she designed and produced her own creations in handmade jewellery and microsculpture. Her work also embraced painting in relief, sculpture and poetry. Each line of jewellery, microsculpture and objets d’art was directly linked with a series of paintings and related to her poetry.

She was nominated for Sculptor of the Year in Corfu (Kerkyra).

=== Books ===
- Memory Paths (EPSILON, 2006)- a book of pictorial poetry

=== Exhibitions ===
Katerina Grolliou's exhibitions in Greece and Cyprus: 1986 – 2009 (11 solo, 7 group shows)

- Phaliro Municipal Cultural Centre, Athens 1991 (Organizational program of European Art Center (EUARCE). Art direction: Evangelos Andreou)
- Papagou Municipal Centre, Athens (2 exhibitions)
- Spiti tis Kiprou, Athens
- Italian School, Athens (2 exhibitions)
- Athens Municipal Cultural Centre, Athens
- Argostoli Philharmonic Exhibition Centre, Cephallonia
- Pessada Cultural Centre, Cephallonia (3 exhibitions)
- Rafina Municipal Cultural Centre, Greece
- “White Rocks” Hotel, Cephallonia
- “Holiday Inn” Hotel, Nicosia, Cyprus
- Municipal Gallery, Art Café, Corfu (3 exhibitions)
- “Thryallis” Art Gallery, Patra
- “Greek Jewellery, 6000 Years of Tradition” (Ministry of Culture), Villa Bianca, Thessaloniki
- “Dante Aligheri” Association, Athens
- “Melina Merkouri” Cultural Centre, Athens
- “Palace of the Duchess of Placentia”, Penteli Municipal Cultural Centre, Athens
- Corfu Municipal Theatre, Corfu
- Atelier “GROLLIO”, Papagou, Athens: December, every year

Her creations have been included in the permanent collections of the Academy of Fine Arts in Florence (since 1986), the Athens Municipality Cultural Centre (since 1994), and the Corfu Municipal Gallery (since 1996). Her work was included in two major publications, Greek Jewellery: 5000 Years of Tradition (1995), and Greek Jewellery: 6000 Years of Tradition (1997), published on the occasion of a major exhibition presenting the history of Greek jewellery through the ages, held at Villa Bianca in Thessaloniki in 1997.
