= Lydia Venieri =

Greek artist (born 1964)

- Born: January 27, 1964 (age 62); Athens, Greece
- Education: 1984 École Nationale Supérieure des Beaux Arts
- Known for: Sculpture, Painting, Photography
- Notable work: Byron Codex, Byronic Heroes, Dolphin Conspiracy, Tomorrow, See No Evil, War Games, Forever After, Hibernation, Planetic Exodus, Telluric Manifesto, Platonic Big Bang
- Website: www.venieri.com

Lydia Venieri is a Greek artist.

== Personal life ==
=== Background ===
Venieri was born in Athens, Greece. She studied at the École nationale supérieure des Beaux-Arts. She has lived in Paris and is currently living in New York. Her web site dates from 1995, and showed some of the first Internet-based art.

== Career ==
=== As artist ===
Venieri is well known for her evocative sculpture installations which bridge mythology with current events, and for her ability to combine humor with self-reflection on human conditions in our times, through her characters that are taken from mythology, history, fairy tales and daily life. In her stories dreams reinforce reality and reality reinforce dreams.

The provocative visualizations of the universe of Venieri's work offer a Potnian statement about the world in flux in which we live.

She has had many exhibitions around the world.

She has been noted as;

"Lydia Venieri erects entire mythologies and symbolic systems from the already phantasmagoric world of news media. Her stories are played out using dolls and childlike imagery to counter media dementia, in painting, drawing, photography, video and the internet. Theogony explicates Venieri's universe surveying two decades of work; work of one of the most celebrated and visionary Greek artists of our time."

She currently shows with Stux Gallery in New York, Gallery Quang in Paris, Galleri S.E in Norway, Tokyo Terra in Japan and Gallery Isabel Aninat in Chile.

== Works ==
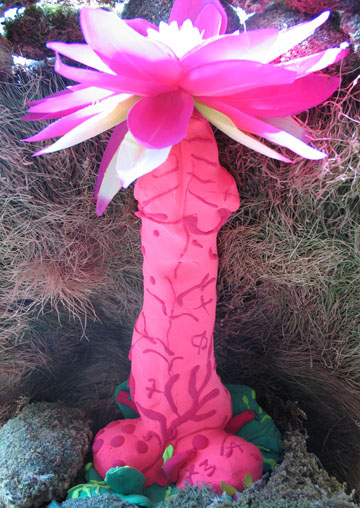
Phallic Lotus, 2004

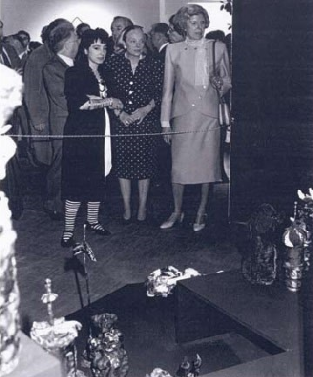
Madame Pompidou discussing with Lydia Venieri her sculpture installation, "La Femme Decoupee" during Carte Blanche at the Georges Pompidou Center, 1987

=== Projects ===
- Byronic Heros, 2017
- Tarot of Love, 2017
- The Dolphin Conspiracy, 2011
- TOMORROW ~ PHOSPHOR STARS IN WHITE NIGHTS, 2009
- See No Evil, 2008
- WarGames, 2006
- For Ever After, 2004
- Hibernation - Sleeping Beauty Conscience, 2002

=== iPhone art ===
- Moonlight, 2009

=== Animations and movies ===
- The Dolphin Conspiracy, 2009
- Tomorrow, 2006
- Epilisy, 2005
- Last Conflict, 2005
- For Ever After, 2004
- Sleeping Beauty Conscience, 2002
- Martha, 1996
- Egg, 1995

=== Books ===
- Moonlight, Lydia Venieri, 2006
- Beyond Being, Lydia Venieri, 2000
- 60 Drawings for Healthy Perversions by Tzimy Panousi, 1995

=== Internet art ===
- Fin
- Her Story
- Apology
- Temple
- Tarot
- Isis

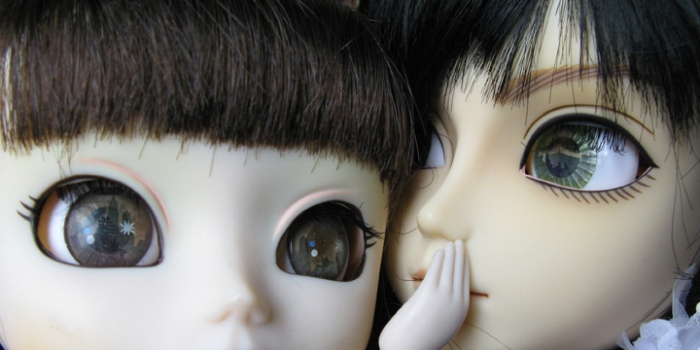
See No Evil, 911, 2008

=== Theatre ===
- Set design for Sarah & Lorraine by Marc Israel-Le Pelletier, Sanford Meisner Theatre, New York.
- Set design for Sarah & Lorraine by Marc Israel-Le Pelletier, Storefront Theatre, Chicago.
- Set design for Hellenic Orchestra's tour of USSR, Soviet Union
- Set design & costumes for The Lady from Ancona, Anatolia of my Soul: 75 years since the Asian Minor Catastrophy, Theatre of Northern * * Greece, Drama & Lykabetus Theatre Atheans, 1997
- Set design for "Inventaires" de Philippe Minyana, directed by Elia Kountis, l'Institute Francais d'Athenes.
- Set design for Daphnis & Cloe, Octana Theatrical Group, Apothiki, Athens
- The lady form Ancona, Anatolia of my Soul: 75 years since the Asian Minor Catastrophy, Lykabetus Theatre, Athenia
- The Five Seasons, Dance theater Octana 1995

== Awards and commissions ==
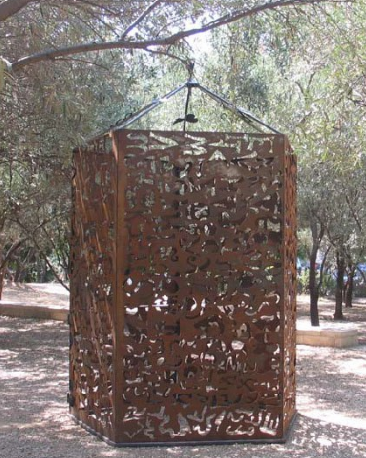
Four meter tower built from iron for the Athens Olympics. here shown at Parthenis Darsilion, Athens, 2004

- Medal for Sculpture, Académie française de Paris, 2004
- Tower of Symbols, Open Air Sculpture, Central Athens, 2004
- Wall of Symbols, Sculpture, Atelier Mallet Stevens, Paris
- Lydia on Broadway, CD-ROM sponsored by Art Magazine and Hewlett Packard
- "Infinity", Collaboration with artist Takis on the sculpture.
- Commande en plein air d'une serie de sculpture Eros et Psyche, Fondation Alexandre Iolas, Athenes
- Commande d'une serie de sculptures pour l'Incitation à la Creation, Abbaye de Montmajour, Arles
- Carte Blanche, a l'occation de l'anniversaire de 10 ans du Centre Georges Pompidou, Galeries Contemporaines, Paris
- Commande en plein air d'une serie de sculputre Eros et Psyche, Fondation Alexandre Iolas, Athenes
- Commande d'une serie de sculptures pour l'Incitation à la Creation, Abbaye de Montmajour, Arles
- Carte Blanche, a l'occation de l'anniversaire de 10 ans du Centre Georges Pompidou, Galeries Contemporaines, Paris
