= George-Maran Varthalitis =

Greek painter

George – Maran Varthalitis
- Born: George – Maran Varthalitis; Athens, Greece
- Known for: Painting, Drawing, Installation Art
- Awards: UNESCO (2005); International Arts Federation (2013); International Arts Conference (2015)
- Website: www.varthalitis-gm.com

George – Maran Varthalitis (Greek: Γεώργιος - Μαράν Βαρθαλίτης) is a Greek artist and conjectural. He is also a life member of UNESCO and awarded from UNESCO, I.A.F. and International Arts Conference. His works can be found in international organisations, institutions and collections.

== Biography ==
George-Maran Varthalitis was born in Greece, in the region of Athens, as the third child of the poet Ioannis Varthalitis and Evgenia Antonopoulos.

He studied "Art conservation" at the University of Indianapolis and "Visual Arts" at the Academy of Florence, honored with a scholarship of the Catholic Church of Greece, where he graduated with honors. He has also attended a course on "Traditional Building Conservation" and he has also studied Byzantine hagiography, fresco painting and tessellation.

== Theories ==
George – Maran Varthalitis has developed some theories over the years in which he has based his art works. The following sections are summaries of these theories.

=== The temporary attribution of love in a painting and the abyssal expulsion of a modular emotional fall (2003) ===
His first theory is entitled "The temporary attribution of love in a painting and the abyssal expulsion of a modular emotional fall". He approaches love through the inner greatest procedure (which in our case is not enough) to the completion of the emotion. It is a chapter which is a part of a greater theoretical work including the following sections: Birth, Knowledge, Creation, Love, Betrayal and Death.

=== Theoretical proposal in approaching a conceptual platform of painting art works and structures in a shape [Icon-Concepts] (2004) ===
His second theory is entitled "Theoretical proposal in approaching a conceptual platform of painting art works and structures in a shape [Icon-Concepts]". This is a theory approaching the point of view of the multiple ingenuities of Howard Gardner by adding a ninth unit, the existential one. According to his theory, for the sake of the iconological conclusion we want to make, each ingenuity is illustrated by the form of [Icon-Ingenuities] and by the form of a puzzle, where the [Viewer – Co-creator] participating by composing the pieces which are morphologically identical but theoretically different (having a different thematic form, depending on the ingenuity). With the completion of this Icon-Puzzle a psychographic result arises, which represents the mental and psychological state of the co-creator. The co-creator is taking an act in the final work, reaching an instantaneously, though permanent until a possible reconstitution of the art, stock of stable truth throughout time.

=== Beautiful decay (2012) ===
His third theory is entitled "Beautiful decay". In his third theory, he touches the subject of the modern human living in cities (Homo Urbanus), his thoughts, his actions, his decisions, his ethics, his entropy, his egoism, his competitiveness, his unwillingness, are his key characteristics and mainly the ones concerning him. Consequently, the decrease of his social and altruistic behavior is obvious. According to George – Maran Varthalitis, the phenomenon of justice belongs to "individual structures". This means that the pneumatic identification of modern human with dogmatism is leading to the manipulation, together with other factors, of public opinion and the deprivation of individuality.

=== The truth of falsehood (2019) ===
His fourth theory is entitled "The truth of falsehood". According to George - Maran Varthalitis, it is certain that reality is experienced sensitively, while individuals understand and translate it mentally. The notion of what constitutes reality and the elements it contains, so that it defines the meaning of "I exist and perceive" at a specific time or not, through the image, results from the outcome. Conclusion's pragmatism along with the subjectivism of the moment, give the futility of truth. The legitimacy of truth in relation to the charm of falsehood, which everyone hopes to be true, offers a compulsive but not honest balance, since fabrication can work amelioratingly and orthographically within reality. Reality and its counterfeit version, brings a great psychological burden, while stepping to the edges of what experts call "borderline personality." Falsehood and truth are a miraculous-exhaustive duo and a necessary condition of reality, both in art and life.

==== The ultimate art of false truth ====
George - Maran Varthalitis also argues that, if we extend the mysterious notion of "mass poisoning", we are talking about the deception of public opinion. The poisoning overrides the rudimentary rumour, even though it uses the same methods. It is not a fraud, although it contains deception and falsehood. It is not a hoax, even though its subordinates are enjoying the results as much as jokesters. It is not propaganda and manipulation although it contains propagandising. It is not brainwashing, even though Mass Media are being used in its contexts. The concept of truth is not being understood or dealt in the same way, relative to the concept of space and time. According to Homer, the word truth means "non-oblivion". If we had to define the concept of truth, we could argue that it is the closest and most complete description-representation of a particular event or object, without forgetting its essential characteristics. In Aristophanes’ “The Knights”, Agorakritus prays before get in a fight with Kleon “Demons of forgiveness and fraud, carnage and stupidity[...]”. In the later years the concept of propaganda (directed fame) was born in the Vatican in 1622 A.D. (Propaganda Fidae). Other forms of propaganda that followed were the communist, the fascist, the Nazi, leading to a series of various socio-political and advertisement propagandas with long-made falsehoods.

==== Truth and social hypocrisy ====
George - Maran Varthalitis also suggests that there is an optimistic perception that the truth will defeat falsehood and light will overcome darkness. He believes that perhaps that is the most prominent dream of religions, of great movements and social reformers. He continues by arguing that they and we need to investigate the field of truth. According to the enlighteners, if we manage to do so, we would be moving into a society of truth, equality; into a society without lying, hypocrisy and delusions. He believes that this could possibly be the greatest collective illusion of history; and that is because falsehood and false consciousness are at the same time comrades of human species. Consciousness is partly "false". We do not mind the truth of others, of nature, of the universe. The inability to perceive universality alters the revelation of truth, pushing the truth of the people and the truth of the universe further. The distance between the socially acknowledged truth and our own grows apart, so falsehood as being an individual's truth is settled in collective and interpersonal relationships. The art through a multitude of lies can cause real emotions, and a false image can serve a truth. We are frightened in front of our truth by looking at the core of our being and our thinking. It is getting assisted by modern society, whose fake and counterfeit values dominate with the help of spectacles and shows, in an environment of generalized ideological and aesthetic confusion.

==== Envy of lying ====
According to George - Maran Varthalitis, in the light of all these previous concepts and notions, falsehood acts as a sieve to filter the truth. It is therefore intertwined with its constitution and acceptance. Falsehood is a phenomenon of the (daily) practice of life and of metaphysical upheaval; if the peace of the soul is desired. It does not always keep in line with the truth. Legal provisions, moral checks, transcendental explorations, law, the “good”, the “divine”, the authorities (lawyers-MPs-priests), are always defining clearly the falsity region; laws, principles and rules by people for people, from one era to another. Thus, the concept of falsehood is entangled, even in a false way. He therefore concludes that art, for the most part, does not present false truths but true lies.

=== The Consciousness of the Ape (2026) ===
In his theory The Consciousness of the Ape (Η Συνείδηση του Πιθήκου), George-Maran Varthalitis explores the philosophical, ethical and social implications of artificial intelligence, technological development and the transformation of human consciousness. The theory examines the relationship between humanity and emerging technologies, raising questions about artificial intelligence, transhumanism, freedom, identity, social inequality and the future meaning of human existence.

The following is an excerpt from the broader theory:

The purpose is not to condemn the new era (AI), but to encourage reflection through the works. The question posed is whether we can ensure that the new tools of artificial intelligence are used, and will continue to be used, for the benefit of humanity and not for the dominance of states, oligarchs, corporations, or even artificial intelligence itself.

The theory aims to provide a framework for works that seek to provoke reflection on a future about which no one can provide answers with certainty. Their purpose is to delve deeper into philosophy, ethics and our collective responsibility.

AGI, or artificial general intelligence, is here. By 2030 it will have surpassed the human being.

The present

We perhaps belong to the last generation that will live its life in a way compatible with its nature. A new generation of hybrid humans is being created, who will live distanced within a virtual world, e.g. the metaverse.

What is required for understanding this approach is the connection of the individual with their future, which contributes to the transformation of their state of consciousness, and through the capitalist system that has been imposed since the middle of the 19th century, while in many countries political discourse becomes divisive, demagogic and authoritarian.

New technologies, such as artificial intelligence and biotechnology, favour the most anti-democratic choices. The formation of moral and class reality changes as it has intervened in the cultural memory of modern human beings.

The more technology stresses the mind of privacy, the more the psychological state of the human being deteriorates, that of a hypothetically homologous machine whose mechanism “brings the present before the signified”, altering thought, judgement and decision.

The texts

Perhaps there is no text, word, image or sound that has not undergone pre-writing by artificial intelligence, hacking the cultural, historical, political and theological, confirming human rights, which are political creations and legislative reserves.

Entities that imitate humans, influencing opinions, ideas, theories and concepts, biological needs such as food or sex, will produce laws, stories, melodies, images and religions.

What would it be like, then, to live in a world of illusions? Plato describes a similar condition in the Allegory of the cave. Dimitris Liantinis asks: when there is nothing true around us, how can we suspect that everything is false? (Connection with the theory The Truth of Falsehood.)

Lost consciousness

Consciousness, inextricably connected from the depths of intelligence, is reshaped by the radiance of a new self-conscious consciousness, which, having hacked everything cognitive, flirts with chaos.

The problem will be magnified with the arrival of quantum artificial intelligence and quantum machine learning (QML), which can write their own code in order to modify themselves. (Geoffrey Hinton, Turing Award.)

Metahuman

Reasoning artificial intelligence allows us to produce a form of digital robots known as agentic artificial intelligence (agentic AI). We are speaking of a robotic workforce.

The world’s first humanoid robot pregnancy substitute by Kaiwa Technology represents a radical change in the history of humanity, opening a dangerous door into uncharted ethical and biological waters.

Questions arise here such as: is your nature determined by biological conditions? Can a digital system transform the identity of the soul? Who will have access to these technological enhancements? Does technology become a dividing line within society? What will humanity mean from now on?

There is no possibility that freedom will exist. We must consider, in the future, a conflict between a small elite of superhumans, enhanced by algorithms, and a vast subordinate class.

Jean Baudrillard, philosopher and sociologist, emphasises the fact that transhumanism transforms human existence and thought into mere simulation, losing its deeper essence.

Or is the deeper human essence found in the process of its transformation?

And finally, let us ask: who benefits, who loses and who decides?

== Awards ==
George – Maran Varthalitis has been awarded for his contribution to art and his theories, by the following committees:

- UNESCO, (2005) at World Expo UNESCO in Brazil, for his artworks based on his second theory titled "Theoretical proposal in approaching a conceptual platform of painting art works and structures in a shape [Icon-Concepts]".
- International Arts Federation (I.A.F.), (2013) at World Expo I.A.F. in Argentina for his artworks based on his third theory entitled "Beautiful Decay".
- International Arts Conference, (2015) in Shanghai - China, with the award "Best European Upcoming Artist".

== Exhibitions ==
George – Maran Varthalitis has done many exhibitions, both individual and group, in many countries. Some of them were held by organizations such as UNESCO and I.A.F.

=== Individual ===
- "The Truth of Falsehood" - China (Macau) - 2024
- "The Truth of Falsehood" - South Korea (Seoul) - 2020
- "Beautiful Decay" - USA (Los Angeles) - 2018
- "Faces and Facts" - USA (Austin) - 2010
- "No Subject" - United Kingdom (London) - 2007
- "The Industrial Diversity Towards the Modern Man" - Greece (Corfu) - 1999

=== Group ===
- "International Art Festival" - Qatar (Doha) - 2024
- "Painting and Calligraphy World Tour" - China (Nanjing) - 2024
- "International Contemporary Exhibition" - USA (Miami) - 2023
- "The Truth of Falsehood" - International Arts Festival - China (Shanghai) - 2023
- "Chinese Painting and Calligraphy World Tour" - National Gallery - Greece (Athens) - 2023
- "International Art Fair" - Italy (Rome) - 2021
- "The Truth of Falsehood" - World Art Festival - United Arab Emirates (Dubai) - 2021
- "The 70th National Day of China" - CIEA-BA - China (Beijing) - 2019
- "The Square: Art and Society in Korea" - 50th Exhibition of MMCA - South Korea (Seoul) - 2019
- "Human Behaviour" - International Arts Conference - China (Shanghai) - 2018
- "The Power of Faith" - World Expo UNESCO - India (Kolkata) - 2018
- "45th Exhibition of Contemporary Art" - Japan (Tokyo) - 2017
- "International Contemporary Art Show" (Scope) - USA (Miami Beach) - 2017
- "Human Moments" - Mexico (Mexico City) - 2016
- "Portraits" - International Arts Conference (Award) - China (Shanghai) - 2015
- "Beautiful Decay" - Japan (Tokyo) - 2015
- "Beautiful Decay" - Russia (Moscow) - 2014
- "Beautiful Decay" - Mexico (Mexico City) - 2014
- "No Item" - World Expo I.A.F. - Portugal (Lisbon) - 2013
- "Human Rights" - World Expo I.A.F. (Award) - Argentina (Buenos Aires) - 2013
- "A Moment's Thought" - Norway (Oslo) - 2012
- "Me, Myself and I" - Italy (Rome) - 2011
- "Counterfeit Truth" - Argentina (Buenos Aires) - 2010
- "Global Disasters and Human Fault" - World Expo UNESCO - Japan (Tokyo) - 2009
- "Libido and Social Acceptance" - World Expo I.A.F. - Germany (Berlin) - 2009
- "Forty-Five Drawings and a Painting for the Human Person" - Pan-European Report - Spain (Madrid) - 2008
- "The Temporary Return of Love" - World Report UNESCO - India (New Delhi) - 2007
- "Christian Necessity" - World Expo I.A.F. - Spain (Madrid) - 2006
- "Human Communication in the Modern Era" - World Expo UNESCO (Award) - Brazil (Brasília) - 2005
- "The Good and Evil in Human Nature" - World Expo UNESCO - China (Beijing) - 2003
- "Religious Allegory" - USA (New York) - 2002
