= Cleophon (poet) =

Ancient Greek dramatist

Cleophon (Greek: Kλεoφῶν, Kleophōn) was an Athenian tragic poet. The titles of ten of his plays are given by the Suda: Acteon, Amphiaraos, Achilles, The Bacchantes, Dexamenus, Erigone, Thyestes, Leucippus, Persis, and Telephus. None of these plays are extant today. As six of these titles are also listed by the Suda as works by Iophon, this may be a corruption of "Iophon".

He is referred to by Aristotle in Poetics and Rhetoric, who notes his prosaic style and lack of idealism.
