= List of Greek women artists =

This is a list of women artists who were born in Greece or whose artworks are closely associated with that country.

== A ==
- Anaxandra (fl. 220s BC), ancient Greek painter
- Aristarete, mentioned in Pliny the Elder's Natural History (XL.147-148) in A.D. 77
- Arleta (born 1945), musician, writer, illustrator

== B ==
- Venia Bechrakis (born 1974), visual artist

== C ==
- Chryssa (1933–2013), Greek-American multidisciplinary artist

== E ==
- Eirene (1st century BC), ancient Greek artist

== F ==
- Thalia Flora-Karavia (1871–1960), painter
- Timarete (5th century BC)

== G ==
- Katerina Grolliou, artist

== I ==
- Iaia, ancient Greek artist

== K ==
- Annetta Kapon (active since 1982), sculptor, installation artist, educator
- Marina Karella (born 1940), painter, sculptor
- Kora of Sicyon (born c. 650 BC), ancient Greek artist
- Aggelika Korovessi (born 1952), sculptor

== L ==
- Maria Lalou (born 1977), performance artist
- Sophia Laskaridou (1882–1965), Impressionist painter, educator

== M ==
- Maria Maragkoudaki (active since 1990), painter
- Maria X (active since 1990s), cultural practitioner, painter, writer
- Jenny Marketou (born 1954), Greek-American multidisciplinary artist, lecturer, writer

== P ==
- Aglaia Papa (1904–1984), painter
- Mina Papatheodorou-Valiraki (active since the 1990s), painter
- Eleni Paschalidou-Zongolopoulou (1909–1991), painter
- Eva Persaki (active since 1975), painter
- Sofia Petropoulou (born 1964), painter
- Heleni Polichronatou (born 1959), sculptor

== S ==
- Erica Scourti, contemporary artist
- Despina Stokou (born 1978), artist and curator
- Danae Stratou (born 1964), visual and installation artist, educator

== T ==
- Timarete (5th century BC), ancient Greek painter
- Dimitra Tserkezou (1920–2007), sculptor

== V ==
- Lydia Venieri (born 1964), sculptor
- Erietta Vordoni (born 1959), painter and sculptor
