= Alexandros Alexandrakis =

Greek painter

Painting depicting Greek soldiers on bayonet charge.

Alexandros Alexandrakis (Greek: Αλέξανδρος Αλεξανδράκης; 1913 in Athens – 1968 in Athens) was a Greek painter, who became widely known from his particularly dynamic depictions of the Greco-Italian War.

Alexandrakis showed an early talent for design and painting. At the age of 17, he exhibited 23 works in a group exhibition organised by HAN (YMCA). He then studied painting at the Athens School of Fine Arts under the supervision of masters Spyridonas Vikatos and Umbertos Argyros. Later, he attended classes in engraving by Giannis Kefallinos. He graduated from university in 1937, and went on to participate in various exhibitions.

After the outbreak of the Greco-Italian War, Alexandrakis and his five brothers were conscripted and the artist found himself in the mountainous area of Pindos where he served as a corporal of the Greek Army. Inspired by his situation, he sketched and painted his memories in a series of artworks that made him popular in Greece in the post-war years. A collection of them was published in 1968 with the title 'The War We Fought – 1940-41' (original in Greek: Έτσι πολεμούσαμε).

He also focused on Art nude, landscapes, allegorical and genre art. Also in 1958 Alexandrakis was the illustrator of Greek elementary school books for the fifth grade. He became known outside Greece when he started collaborating with institutions such as the Guggenheim Museum and USA Senator Library. He died in 1968, at the age of 55.

In 1980, the National Gallery of Greece honoured Alexandrakis with a Retrospection Exhibition. His artworks can be found in the National Gallery of Greece, Athens War Museum and private galleries in Greece and abroad.

== Works ==
- Α. Αλεξανδράκης, Έτσι πολεμούσαμε 1940-41, εκδ. Πάπυρος, Αθήνα 1968. (Publication in 4 languages Greek, English, French και German.)
- A. Alexandrakis, The War We Fought, 1940-41, The Hellenic Centre, London 1995, ISBN 0-9525518-0-2.
