= Laskaridou =

Laskaridou is a surname. Notable people with the surname include:

- Aikaterini Laskaridou
- Sophia Laskaridou
