= Behrakis =

Behrakis (Greek: Μπεχράκης) is a Greek surname. Notable people with the surname include:

- George D. Behrakis (born 1934), Greek-American entrepreneur and philanthropist
- Yannis Behrakis (1960–2019), Greek photojournalist

== See also ==
- Venia Bechrakis
