= Giorgos Gounaropoulos =

- Γιώργος Γουναρόπουλος
- Born: 22 March 1890; Sozopol, Bulgaria
- Died: 17 August 1977 (aged 87); Athens, Greece
- Other names: Greek: Γιώργος Γουναρόπουλος
- Occupation: Painter

Giorgos Gounaropoulos (Greek: Γιώργος Γουναρόπουλος, 22 March 1890 – 17 August 1977) was a Greek artist.

== Life ==
Giorgos Gounaropoulos was born in Sozopol, Bulgaria, on 22 March 1890, the sixth child of a Greek family. In the early 1900s the Bulgarian government put pressure on Greek-origin families in the country to adopt the Bulgarian national identity. The family decided to move to Greece, and in 1904 settled in Athens. Because of his family financial situation, as a teenager Gounaropoulos earned money by creating signages. From 1907 to 1912 he studied at the Athens School of Fine Arts under Spyros Vikatos, Dimitrios Geraniotis, Georgios Roilos and Georgios Jakobides. He was awarded an Averoff scholarship, and after World War I (1914–18) he went to Paris in 1919 and attended the Académie Julian and the Académie de la Grande Chaumière. While in Paris he participated in Salons, opened his own studio and held his first solo exhibition at the Vavin-Raspail Gallery in 1926.

Gounaropoulos staged his first exhibition in Athens in 1924 and a controversial solo exhibition at the Stratigopoulos gallery in 1929. He returned to Athens permanently in 1931. He continued to exhibit in solo and group shows, including international shows in São Paulo in 1959 and Alexandria in 1963. He was awarded a Guggenheim Fellowship in 1958. He died in 1977 in Athens.

== Work ==
Gounaropoulos began painting in academic style, then was influenced by impressionism and Paul Cézanne, and eventually developed a very personal surrealistic style. His paintings have a dreamy and lyrical quality inspired by ancient Greek art. He illustrated collections of poetry, made wall paintings for the Municipal Council of Athens (1937–39) and painted the iconography for the chapel of the Public Hospital of Volos (1951). His home was donated by his family to become the home of the Gounaropoulos Museum in 1979. Examples of his work are also held by the Municipal Art Gallery of Ioannina.

== Sources ==
- Δημοτική Πινακοθήκη (in Greek), Municipality of Ioannina, archived from the original on 2015-09-18
- Gounaropoulos Giorgos (Gounaro), National Gallery of Greece, archived from the original on 2016-04-10
- Οδοιπορικό, G. Gounaropoulos museum, archived from the original on 2011-12-03
