= Gabriella Simossi =

Greek sculptor (1926–1999)

- Γαβριέλλα Σίμωσι
- Born: 1 August 1926; Pyrgos, Elis, Kingdom of Greece
- Died: 27 May 1999 (aged 72); 15th arrondissement of Paris, France
- Education: Athens School of Fine Arts, 1950; Beaux-Arts de Paris; Académie de la Grande Chaumière, 1957
- Spouse: Yannis Gaïtis (died 1984)
- Children: Loretta Gaïtis
- Awards: Ordre des Arts et des Lettres, 1992

Gabriella Simossi (Greek: Γαβριέλλα Σίμωσι; 1 August 1926 – 27 May 1999) was a Greek sculptor active in Paris.

== Biography ==
Simossi was born on 1 August 1926 in Pyrgos, Elis.

From 1945 to 1950, Simossi studied at the Athens School of Fine Arts under Michael Tombros. In 1954, Simossi settled in Paris with her husband Yannis Gaïtis, a painter and sculptor. Simossi subsequently attended the Beaux-Arts de Paris, before studying under Ossip Zadkine at the Académie de la Grande Chaumière during 1955 to 1957.

In 1992, Simossi was awarded the Ordre des Arts et des Lettres. On 27 May 1999 Simossi died in 15th arrondissement of Paris, aged 72.

== Legacy ==
In 2024, the Gaïtis-Simossi Museum was opened in Ios in partnership with the architect Loretta Gaïtis, the couple's daughter.
