= Philolaos (sculptor) =

Greek artist (b. 1923, d. 2010)

Philolaos Tloupas
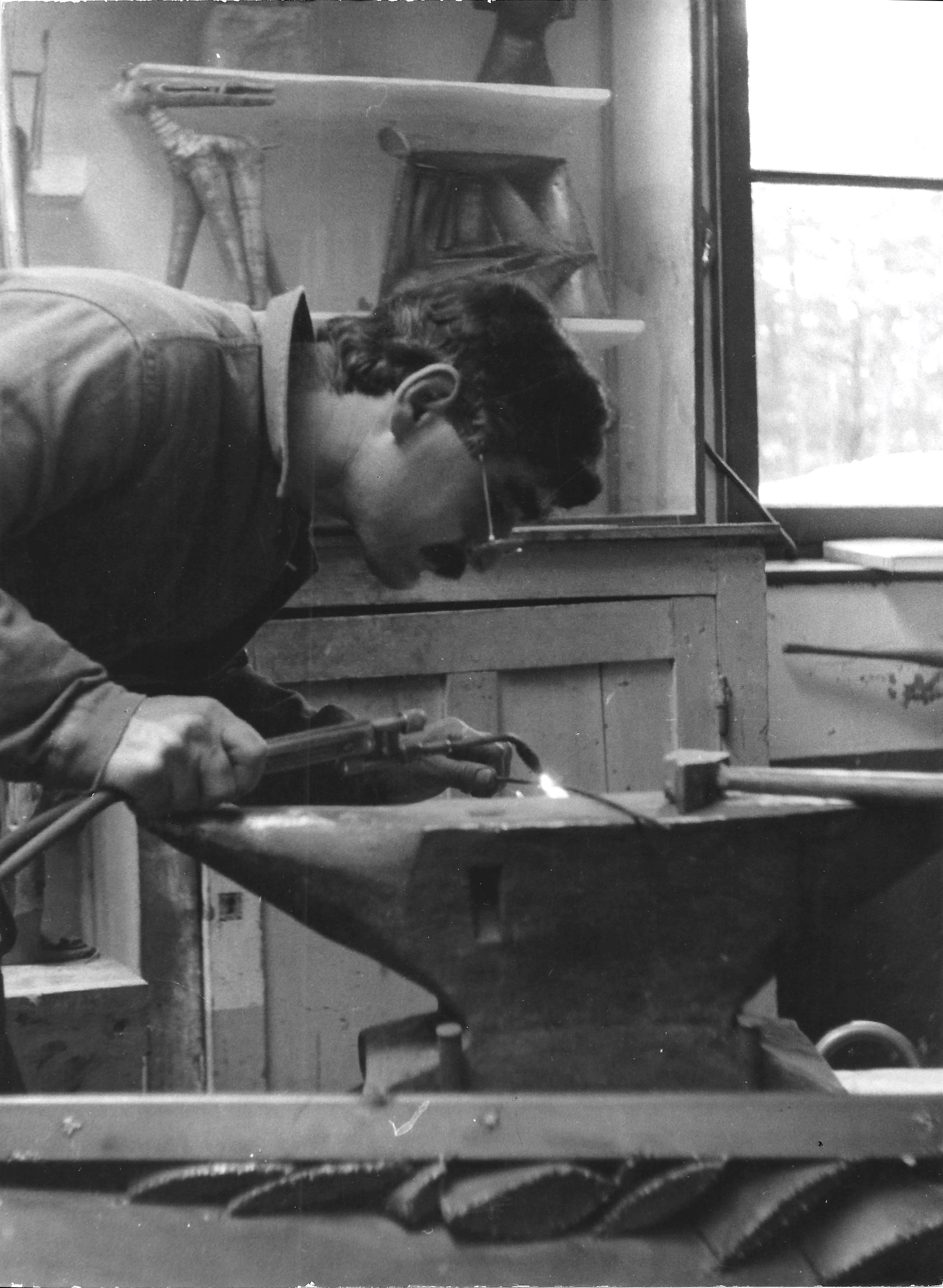
- Born: 23 March 1923; Larissa, Greece
- Died: 18 September 2010 (aged 87); Orsay, France
- Resting place: Saint-Rémy-lès-Chevreuse
- Education: Athens School of Fine Arts, Athens, Greece
- Known for: sculpture

Philolaos Tloupas, known as Philolaos, was a Greek sculptor. He lived most of his life in France, where he died in 2010.

He is known as the "architects' sculptor," having created, in collaboration with architects and urbanists, works integrated into architecture and landscapes. He created sculptures using a wide variety of materials (stainless steel, terracotta, marble, wood, concrete, etc.). He also created relief paintings in driftwood or turned wood, furniture, and numerous utilitarian objects that he designed and made himself.

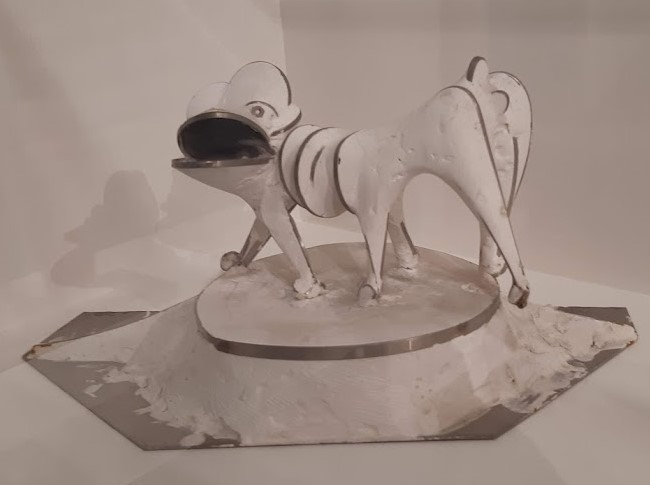
Philolaos: sculpture

== Biography ==
The son of Georgios Tloupas and Vasiliki Batzou, Philolaos was born on 4 March 1923. His father, a carpenter, was his first teacher. He also believed that his grandfather, a boilermaker, although he never knew him, had instilled in him a love of metalworking.

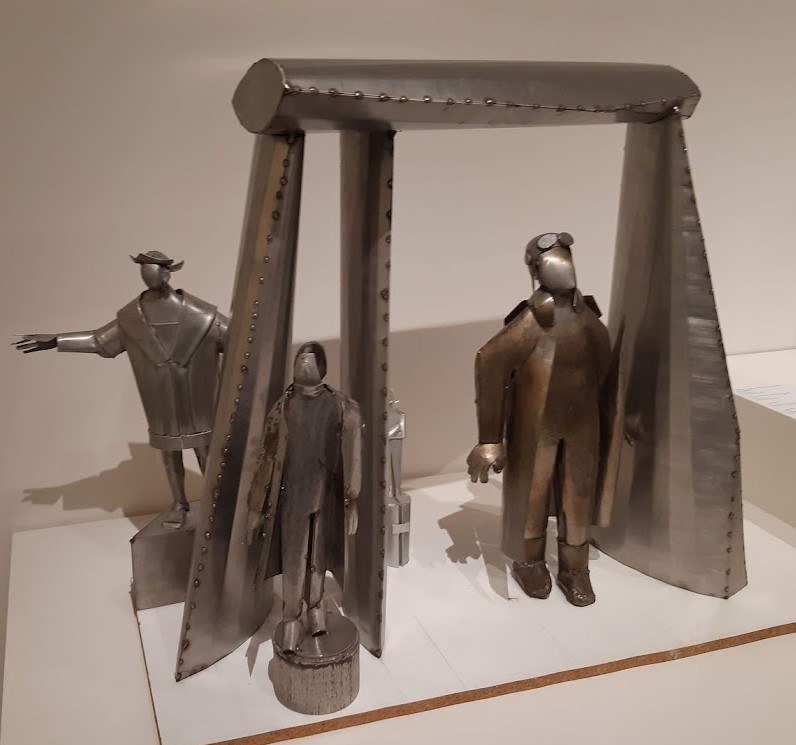
Philaos: sculptural model in stainless steel

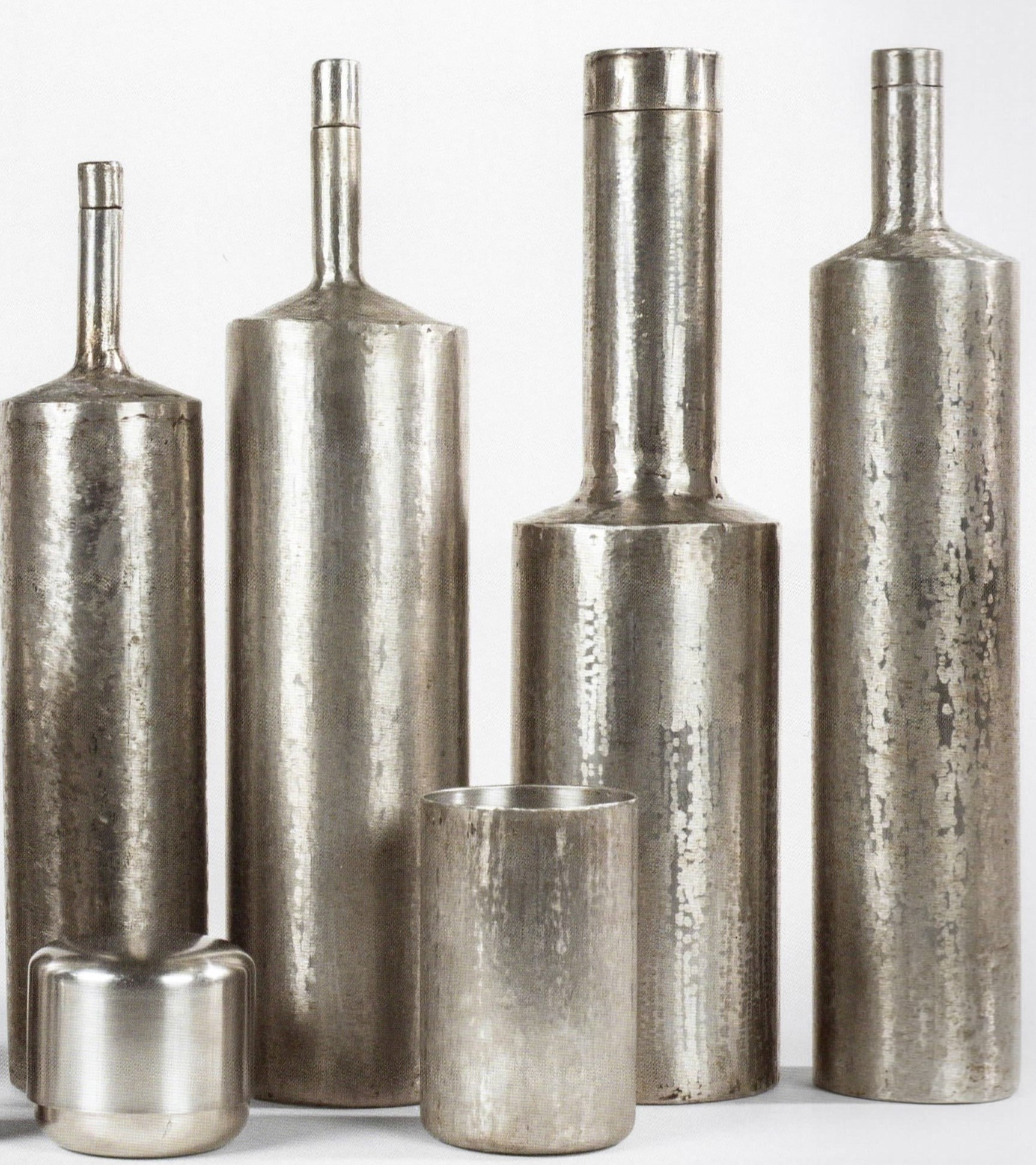
Philolaos: bottlels

Philolaos attended the Athens School of Fine Arts from 1944 to 1947 working under the supervision of Michael Tombros and Athanasius Apartis. After graduating and completing his military service (1947 and 1950), he went to Paris where he enrolled at the École des Beaux-Arts. There, he studied under the sculptor Marcel Gimond.

In 1956, he married Simonne Walter, and his daughter Isabelle was born a year later. His son, Yorgo, was born in 1974 from his second marriage to Marina Assaël.

He designed and built a house in Platamon, Greece, himself (1957–58). He also designed and built his studio in Saint Rémy de la Chevreuse (30 km south of Paris) in 1967, and his house in 1974. In 1974, he also acquired another house in Pelion, Greece.

He died on 18 September 2010, in Orsay.

== Representative works in public spaces ==
- 1963: 'Water towers' of the city of Valence (Drôme), built in collaboration with the architect André Gomis. The two twisted towers, 57 meters high, are today the emblem of the city and have been classified as 20th century heritage by the French Ministry of Culture.

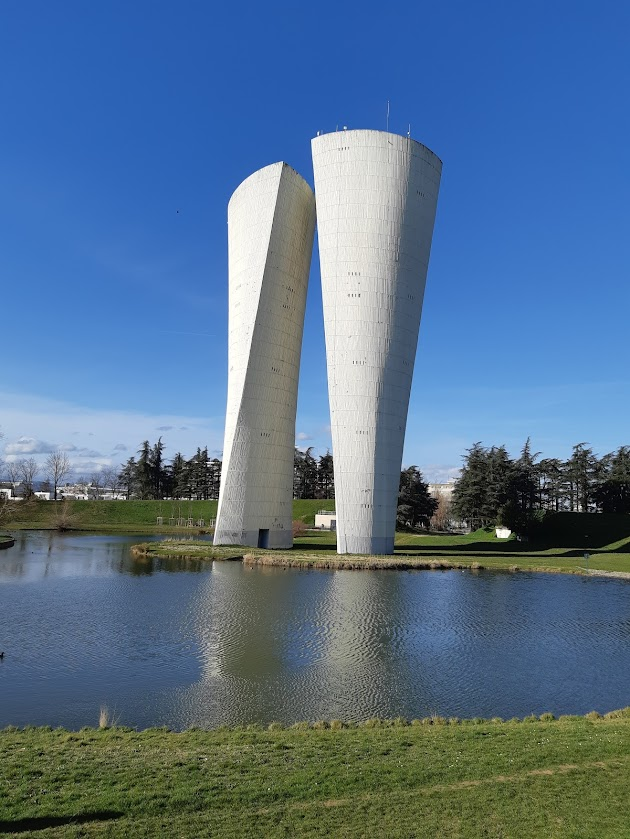
Water towers, Valence (France)

- 1967: Sculpture in the gardens of the Érables de la Duchère building in Lyon.
- 1967: Stainless steel fountain sculptures at the Balaruc-les-Bains Family Holiday Village (Hérault). The architect was André Gomis.
- 1969: Sculpted square in Épernay (Marne). In collaboration with the architect, Jacques Gautier, and landscape architect J. Sgard.
- 1971: The Mechanical Bird, a monumental sculpture at La Défense.
- 1979: Stainless steel sculpture at the Henry Bordeaux Middle School in Cognin (Savoie), built by architects D. Cler and J. Belmont.
- 1980: Sculpted wall in washed concrete and stainless steel at the Remalard Middle School in Orne. The architects were Michel Andrault and Pierre Parat.
- 1982: Fruit bowl and fruits at the Les Pépinières school group in Voisins-le-Bretonneux (Yvelines).
- 1986: Sculptures on the Volos waterfront.
- 1989: Water Lilies, a monumental flower-shaped sculpture in a pond at La Défense.
- 1991: Monument to the National Resistance in Larisa (Greece).
- 1996: The Gogottes Garden in Guyancourt. Garden designed by urbanist Jean-Noël Capart and landscape architect Jacques Simon.
- 2000: Stainless steel metal tree in the Place Helder Camara in Guyancourt (Yvelines).

== Museum exhibitions ==
- 2005: Jardin du Palais-Royal à Paris
- 2019–2020: Valence Museum
- 2024–2025: Larissa Municipal Galley
- 2025: Municipal Gallery of Thessaloniki (Grèce)
