= Tasos Dimos =

Greek painter

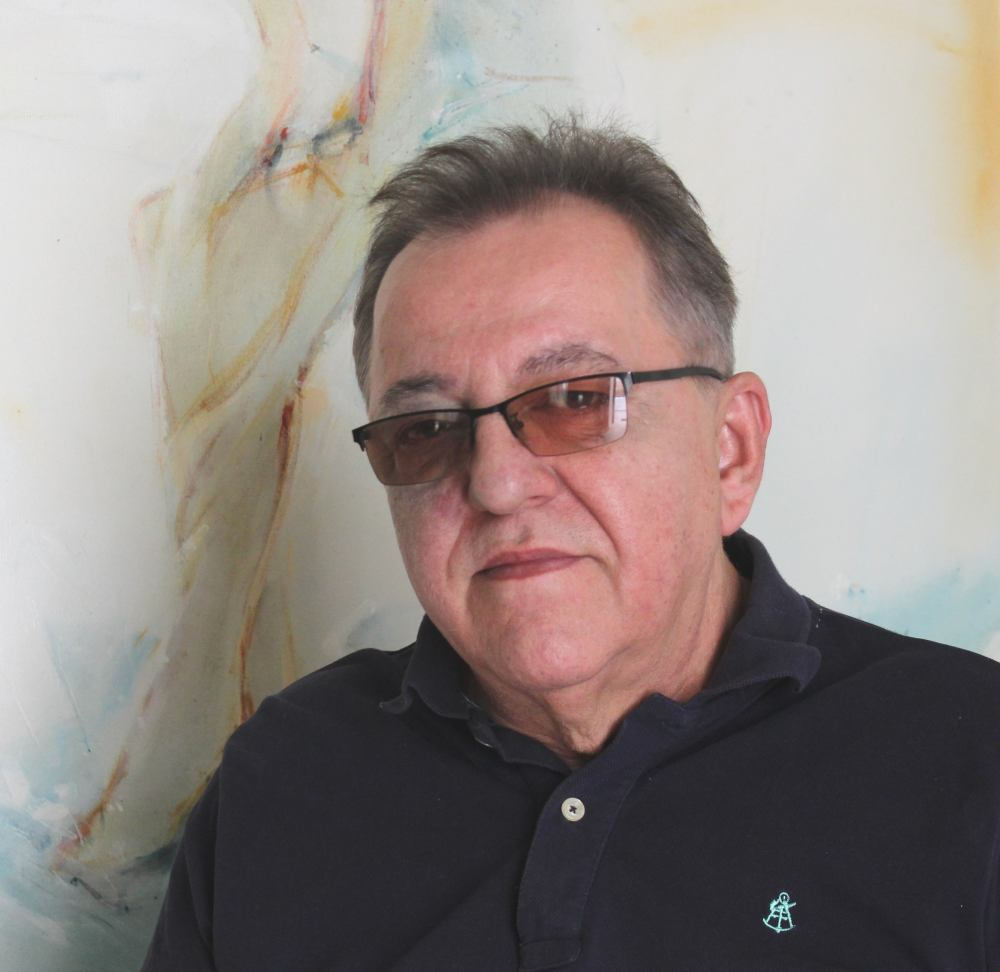
- Dimos in 2022
- Born: 28 December 1960 (age 65); Neo Psychiko, Greece
- Education: Athens School of Fine Arts
- Occupations: Painter, sculptor
- Years active: 1980s–present
- Spouse: Katerina Zionga

Signature
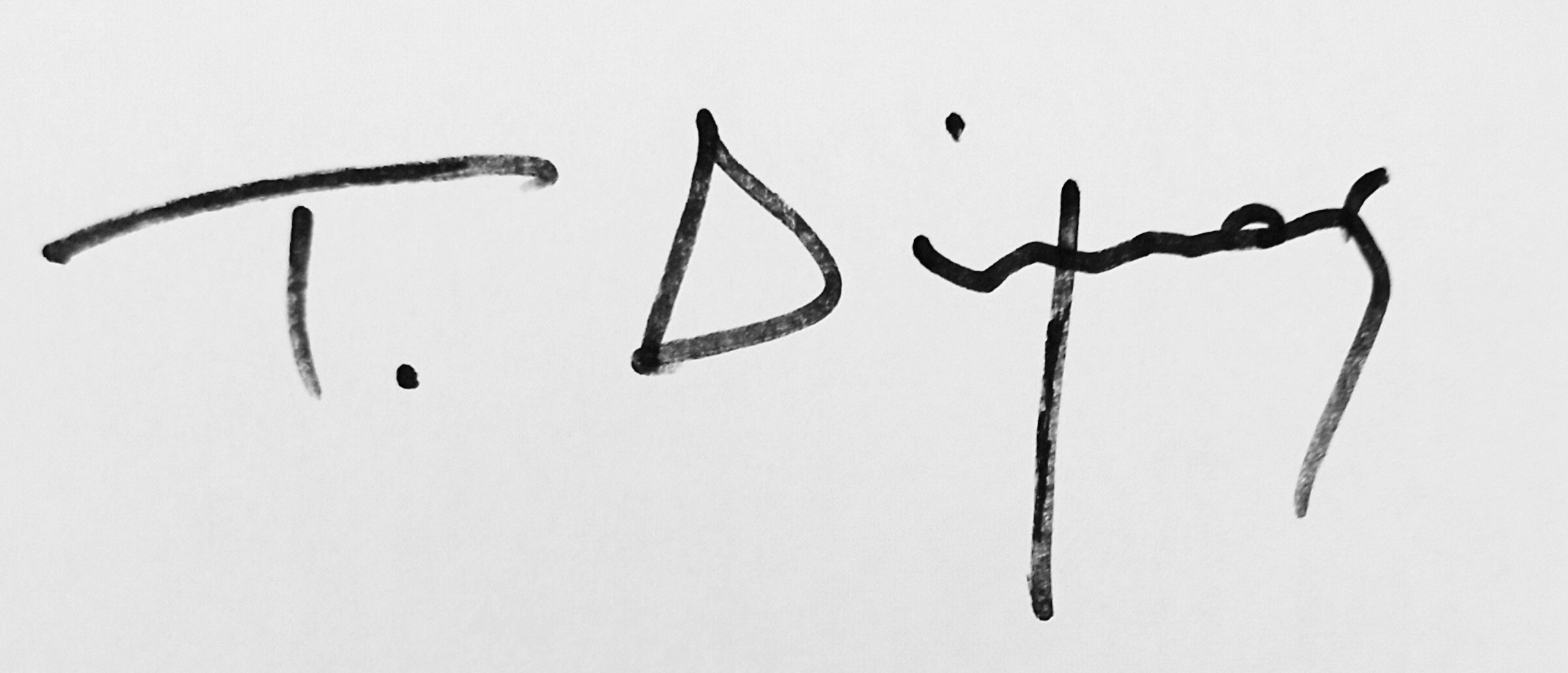

Anastasios "Tasos" Dimos (Greek: Αναστάσιος «Τάσος» Δήμος) is a Greek painter and sculptor. He was born in Athens in 1960, and he studied at the Athens School of Fine Arts (A.S.F.A.). His resume includes over a hundred solo and group exhibitions. His paintings are featured in many public and private collections in Greece, the United States, Japan, Switzerland, the United Kingdom, Germany, Cyprus and Saudi Arabia.

== Biography ==
Tasos Dimos was born in Neo Psychiko, Attica, north of the municipality of Athens, on 28 December 1960. He comes from Arta and Ioannina.

He began his studies in the workshop of the painter, Georgios Vakirtzis, in 1979, and enrolled at the Athens School of Fine Arts in 1983. His professors were Demosthenes Kokkinidis, Dimitris Mytaras, Vangelis Dimitreas and Marina Lambraki-Plaka. He received scholarships from the Greek State and in 1988 he graduated with honors. He continued his studies at the Hochschule der Künste in Berlin with a scholarship from Bosch, under Syrian painter Marwan Kassab-Bachi. He is a member of the Chamber of Fine Arts of Greece since 1989.

In 1984, he married Katerina Zionga and they had two children together, George and Maria. He has been a resident of Papagou-Cholargos for several years now.

From 2001 onwards, he has been participating (with various galleries), in many annual art fairs, such as Art Athina and Art Thessaloniki.

His paintings can be found at the Goulandris Museum of Contemporary Art, the National Museum of Contemporary Art (EMST), the Averof Art Gallery, the municipal galleries of Papagou-Cholargos, Corinth and Karditsa, the A.S.F.A., the Parnassos Literary Society, and the Hellenic Parliament collections, the Heraklion Museum of Visual Arts, the C. & S. Moshandreou collection and the Copelouzos Family Art Museum.

In May 2025, he participated with his painting "Oasis" in "The Greek Sale" auction organized by Bonhams in Athens and Paris.

== Style ==
His style has been influenced by the Impressionist movement, with some Expressionist elements. His paintings often feature children and female figures, against an abstract or minimalist background. Many critics and art historians have written about his work, including Dora Markatos, Athena Schina and Konstantinos Papachristos, of the Benaki Museum, as well as PhD in Economic and Social Sciences at the University of Geneva, Meletis Meletopoulos.

== Notable exhibitions ==
- 1989 "15th Meeting of Young Creators", solo exhibition at Ora Cultural Centre, Athens.
- 1995 "Paradise Lost", solo exhibition at Galerie Titanium, Athens. Curated by Art Historian Nelly Misirli, of the National Gallery.
- 2003 "Communicative Art", solo exhibition at the Château de Coudrée, Geneva, sponsored by Lockheed Martin
- 2005 "Ports of Hellenism", a group exhibition of port paintings at the State Museum of Contemporary Art in Thessaloniki, in collaboration with the International Visual Arts Center AENAON
- 2023 "The Greek Epic of 1940", solo exhibition at the Athens War Museum.

== Catalogues ==
- (2011) Ferae Naturae. Athens: Nereus Publishers.
- (2019) Starting Point. Athens: Kourd Gallery.
