= Yiannis Spyropoulos =

Greek painter (1912–1990)

Yiannis Spyropoulos Γιάννης Σπυρόπουλος
- Born: 12 March 1912; Pylos, Greece
- Died: 18 May 1990 (aged 78); Athens, Greece
- Education: Athens School of Fine Arts; École nationale supérieure des Beaux-Arts
- Awards: First prize of the Academy of Athens

Yiannis Spyropoulos (Greek: Γιάννης Σπυρόπουλος; 12 March 1912 – 18 May 1990) was a Greek painter.

== Life and work ==
Spyropoulos was born on 12 March 1912, in Pylos. In 1933, he was accepted at the Athens School of Fine Arts. His teachers included Spyridon Vikatos, Oumbertos Argyros and Epameinondas Thomopoulos. Eight years later, the Academy of Athens rewards Spyropoulos with the first prize and the opportunity to study in the École nationale supérieure des Beaux-Arts in Paris. During his studies, he was taught by Charles-François-Prosper Guérin. He died on 18 May 1990, aged 78, in Athens.

== See also ==
- Art in modern Greece
- Contemporary Greek art
