= Giorgos Charvalias =

Greek painter and academic, born 1956

Giorgos Charvalias (Greek: Γιώργος Χαρβαλιάς; 1956) is a Greek painter and former rector of the Athens School of Fine Arts.

== Biography and career ==
Charvalias was born in Athens in 1956 where he lives and works. At first he studied graphic arts (1971–1974) and then he entered the Athens School of Fine Arts from 1976 until 1983, where he studied under Dimitris Mytaras, Lefteris Kanakakis and Dimosthenis Kokkinidis. Subsequently, he became a scientific collaborator at the same institution, where he was also a postgraduate student in Nikos Kessanlis' workshop. At the same time he taught at the Technological Educational Institute (TEI) of Athens from 1979 to 1985. Since 1987, he teaches painting at the Athens School of Fine Arts. In 2002 he was elected associate professor and in 2006–2007 he served briefly as the institution's vice rector. In 2009 Charvalias was elected rector, a position he held until 2014 succeeded by Marios Spiliopoulos.

Charvalias is considered an expressionist and an action painter while his work has been presented in various solo and group exhibitions in museums and galleries in Greece and abroad. Artworks of Charvalias have been acquired by museums and galleries, including the National Gallery of Greece, the National Museum of Contemporary Art, Frissiras Museum and Vorres Museum.

== Bibliography ==
- Κομίνη-Διαλέτη, Δώρα· Ματθιόπουλος, Ευγένιος Δ (1997). Λεξικό Ελλήνων Καλλιτεχνών:Ζωγράφοι, γλύπτες, χαράκτες, 16ος-20ός αιώνας. Καλλιτεχνική βιβλιοθήκη. 4. Athens: MELISSA Publishing House. p. 423. ISBN 9789602042267.
