= Erietta Vordoni =

Greek painter and sculptor

- Εριέττα Βορδώνη
- Born: Filothei, Athens, Greece
- Alma mater: Athens School of Fine Arts, École nationale supérieure des Beaux-Arts
- Known for: painting, sculpture
- Website: www.vordoni.com

Erietta Vordoni (Greek: Εριέττα Βορδώνη) is a Greek painter and sculptor based in Athens.

== Biography ==
Vordoni was born in Filothei, a northeastern suburb of Athens. She studied at the Athens School of Fine Arts under Yannis Moralis and she graduated in 1980. Thanks to her high performances as a student, she earned a scholarship from the Academy of Athens and the following year she moved to France for further studies at the École nationale supérieure des Beaux-Arts in Paris under César and Leonardo Cremonini.

After her graduation Vordoni returned to Greece where she resides. Furthermore, she partially spends some months per year in Paris, where she owns an atelier provided to her by the French government for artistic reasons.

Vordoni has shown her work in numerous individual and group exhibitions in Greece, France, Monaco, Belgium, United Kingdom, Italy, United States, Australia etc. Her paintings and sculptures can be found in private collections, museums and cultural institutions including National Gallery of Greece, Queens Museum of New York, Vorres Museum and Athens Art Gallery as also in public spaces like Kifisias Avenue in Athens and Kefalonia Botanica in Argostoli.

== Awards ==
In 1981 she won the first prize for her nude and dossier - portfolio at the ASFA. In 1984 she was awarded by the National Museum of Monte Carlo while in 1997 she was awarded for her paintings at the Salon de Montrouge in Paris.

== Exhibitions (selected) ==
=== Individual exhibitions ===
- Athens Gallery (1984, 1990, 1996, 2007, 2011)
- Vorres Museum, Paiania (1984)
- Queens Museum, New York (1986)
- French Institute, Thessaloniki (1987)
- Staehelin Gallery, Zurich (1987)
- Zygos Gallery, Washington D.C. (1987)
- Galerie Beau Lezard, Paris (1988)
- Galerie Lavignes, Bastille, Paris (1989, 1991)
- Galerie Michaella Moller, Munich (1992)
- Gallery ZM, Thessaloniki (1993)
- Musee d ' Art Moderne et d' Art Contemporain, Nice (1994)
- MANY H, Tel Aviv (1997)
- Galerie de Dessin, Brussels (2004)
- Karydion Art Center, Athens (2006)
- Castello di Torrechiara, Parma Italy (2008)
- Contemporary Art Center Otto, Milan (2010)
- Space Pergolesi 8 s.r.l., Milan (2010)
- Historical Archives - Museum of Hydra (2013)
- Gallery Boulakia, Paris (2013)
- Riflemaker Gallery, London (2015)
- Hellenic Culture Center, London (2015)
- Evripides Art Gallery, Athens (2016)

=== Group exhibitions ===
- Grand Palais, Paris (1984)
- National Museum of Monte Carlo (1984)
- National Museum of Modern Art, Seoul (1985)
- Gallery of Hamilton, Hamilton, Ontario (1986)
- Atelier Lambert, Paris (1987)
- City of Athens Cultural Center (1988)
- Centre or Contemporary Art, Seattle (1990)
- International Biennale of Lithography, Lubliana (1995)
- Palazzo delle Esposizioni, Rome (1996)
- Salon de Montrouge, Prix au Salon de Montrouge (1997)
- Selini Gallery, Athens (1999)
- St. Etienne Museum (2000)
- Technopolis, Athens (2004)
- Belgravia Gallery, London (2007)
- Benaki Museum, Athens (2007, 2013)
- Μuseum of Contemporary Art, Shanghai (2008)
- Tracing, Istanbul (2010)
- Technopolis, Gazi, Athens (2010)
- Cephalonia Botanica, Argostoli (2010)
- Philip Dreyfus Collection, Poseidonion Grande Hotel, Spetses (2013)
