= Maragkoudakis =

Maragkoudakis or Maragkoudaki is a Greek surname. Notable people with the surname include:

- Maria Maragkoudaki (fl. 1990), Greek actress
- Markos Maragoudakis (born 1982), Greek-Congolese footballer
