= Georgios Bonanos =

Greek sculptor

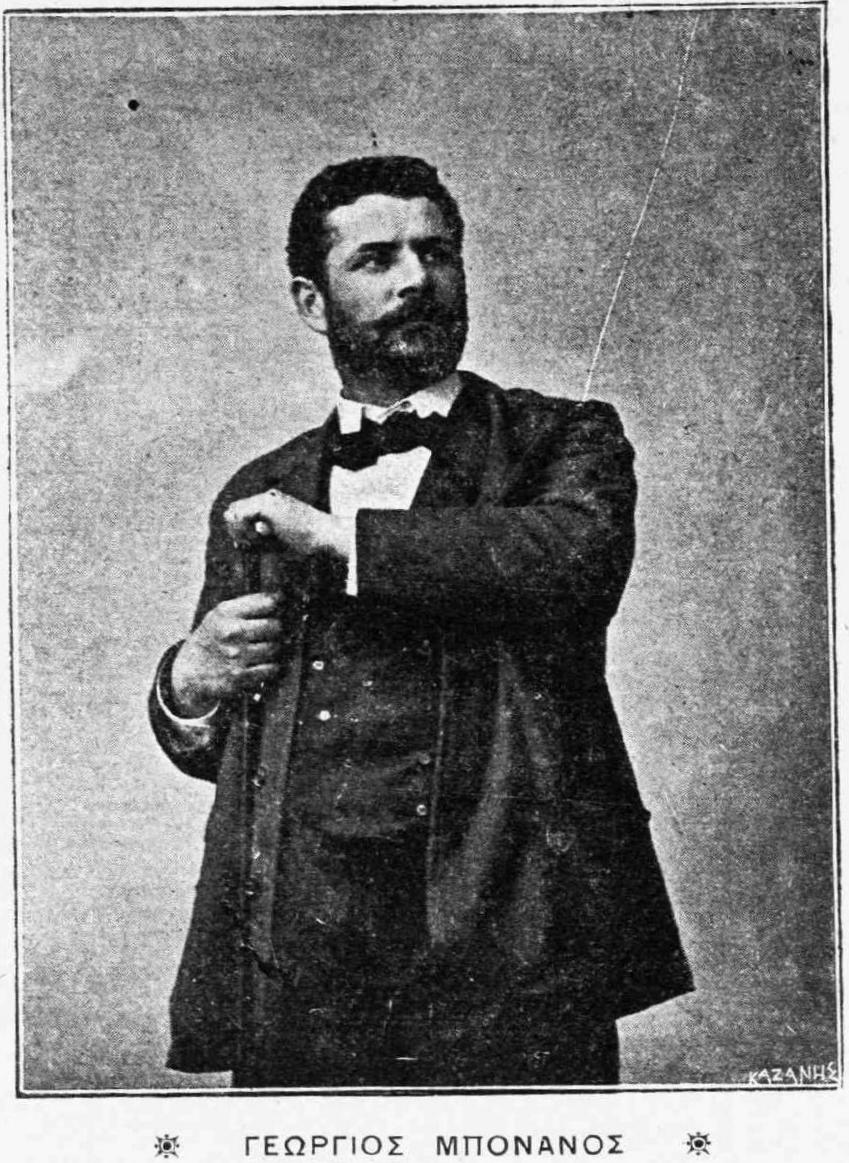
- Georgios Bonanos
- Born: 1863; Lixouri, Kefalonia
- Died: 1939 or 1940; Athens

Georgios Bonanos (Greek: Γεώργιος Μπονάνος; 1863–1939 or 1940) was a Greek sculptor.

He was born in Lixouri, Kefalonia and studied at the Athens School of Fine Arts. Leonidas Drosis was his professor. He created several statues and busts, placed all over Greece. He died in Athens.

== Gallery ==
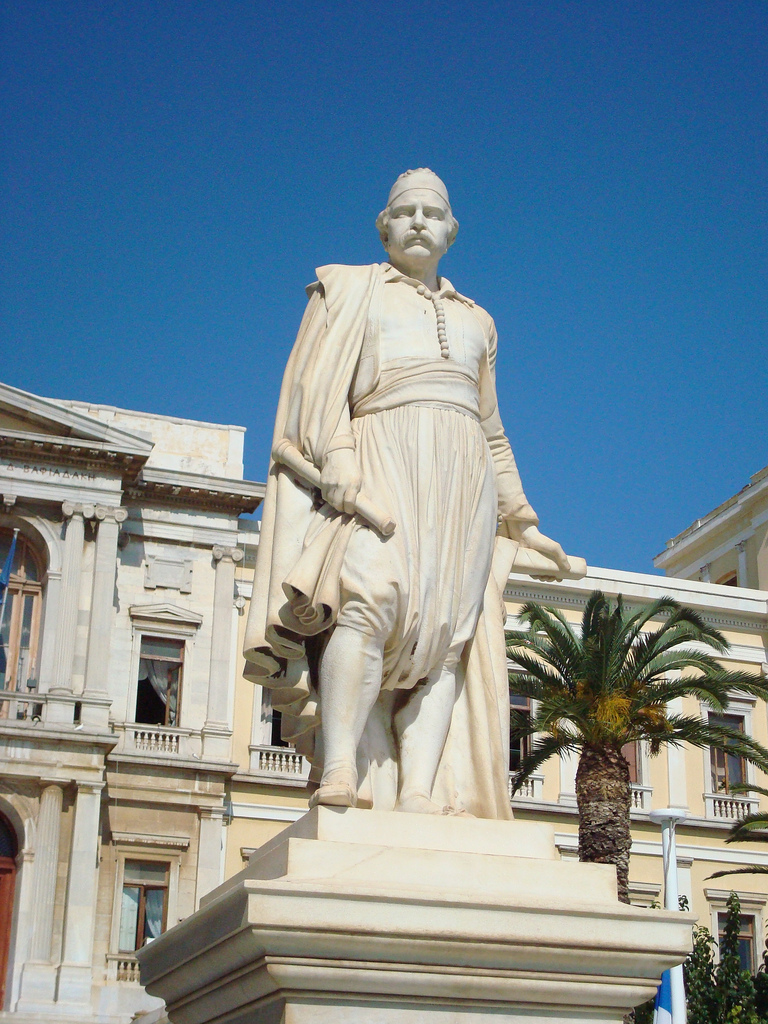
Statue of Andreas Miaoulis

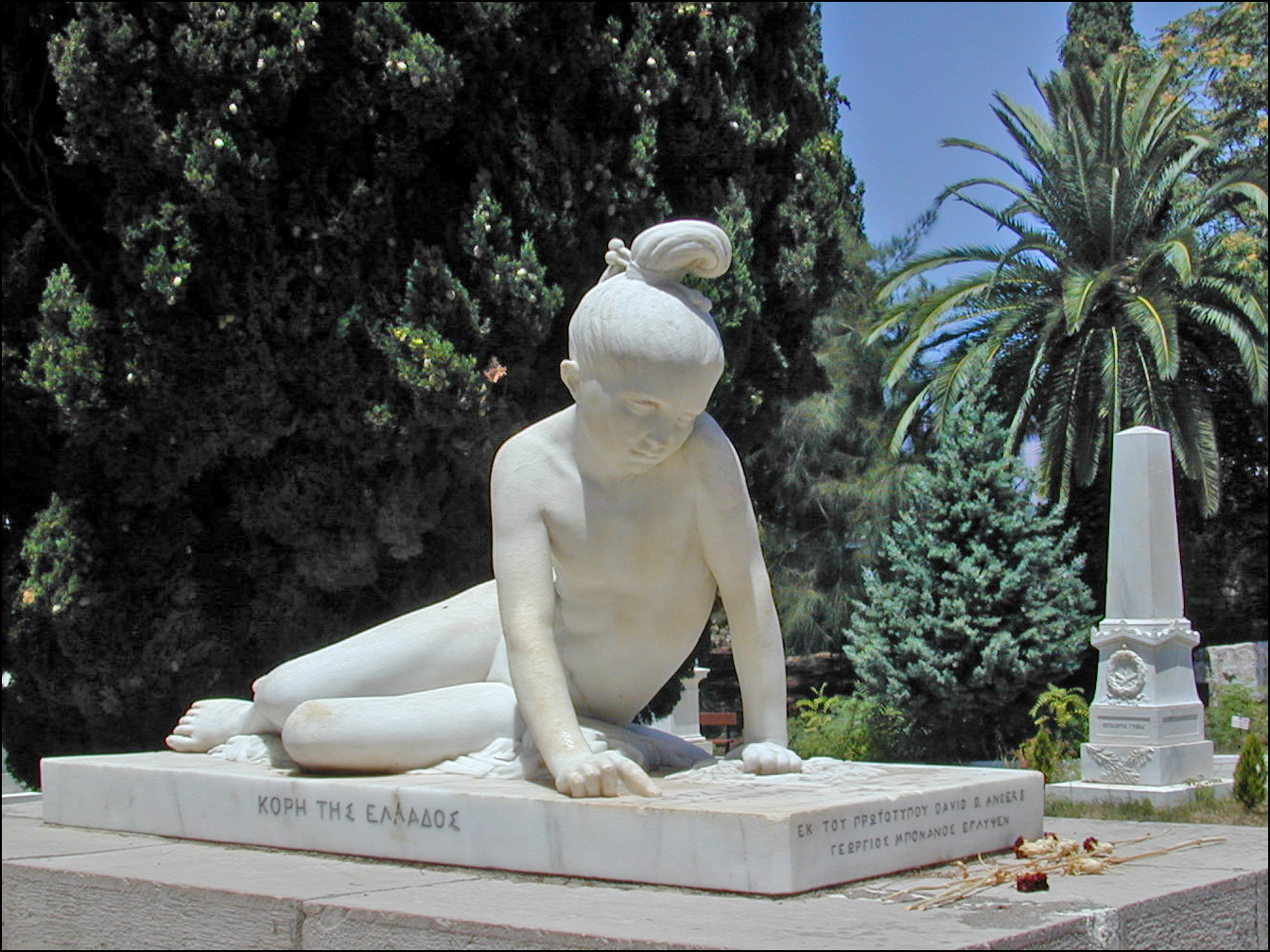
The Greek Girl Replica of David d'Angers Sculpture

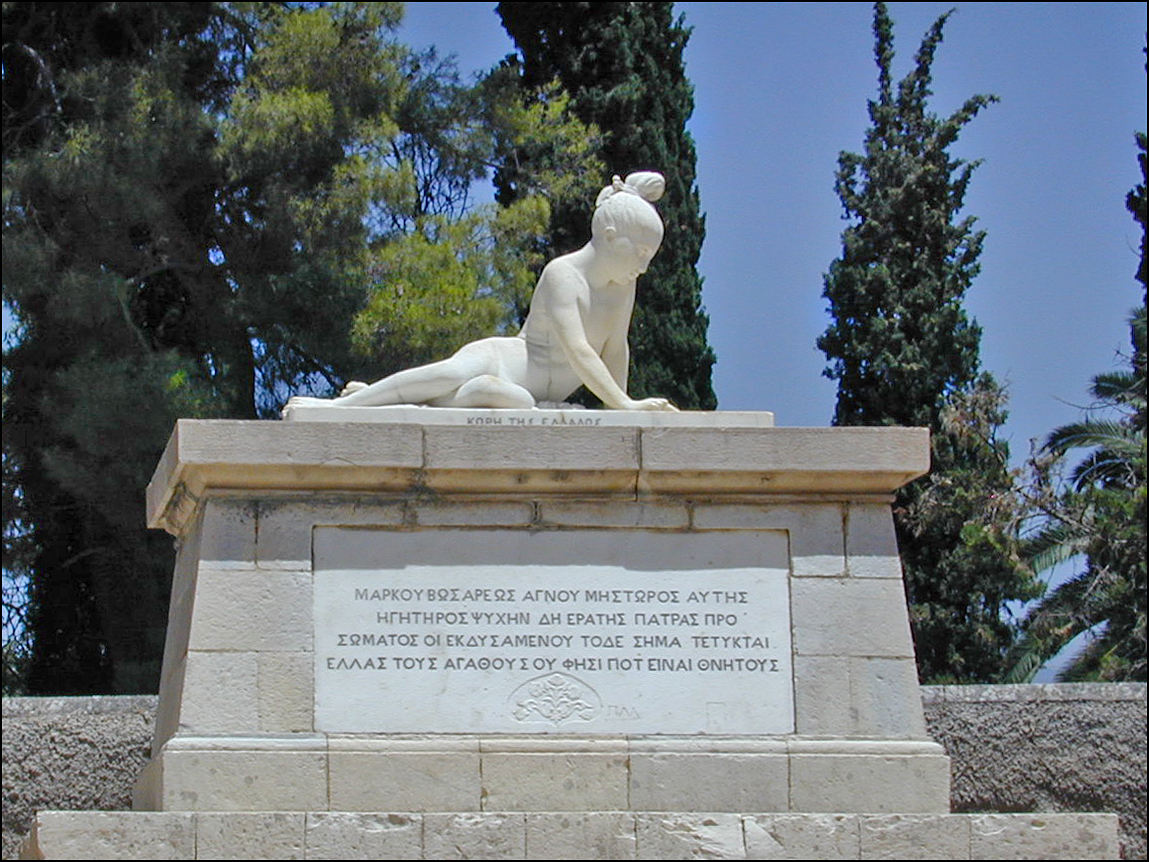
Daughter of Greece

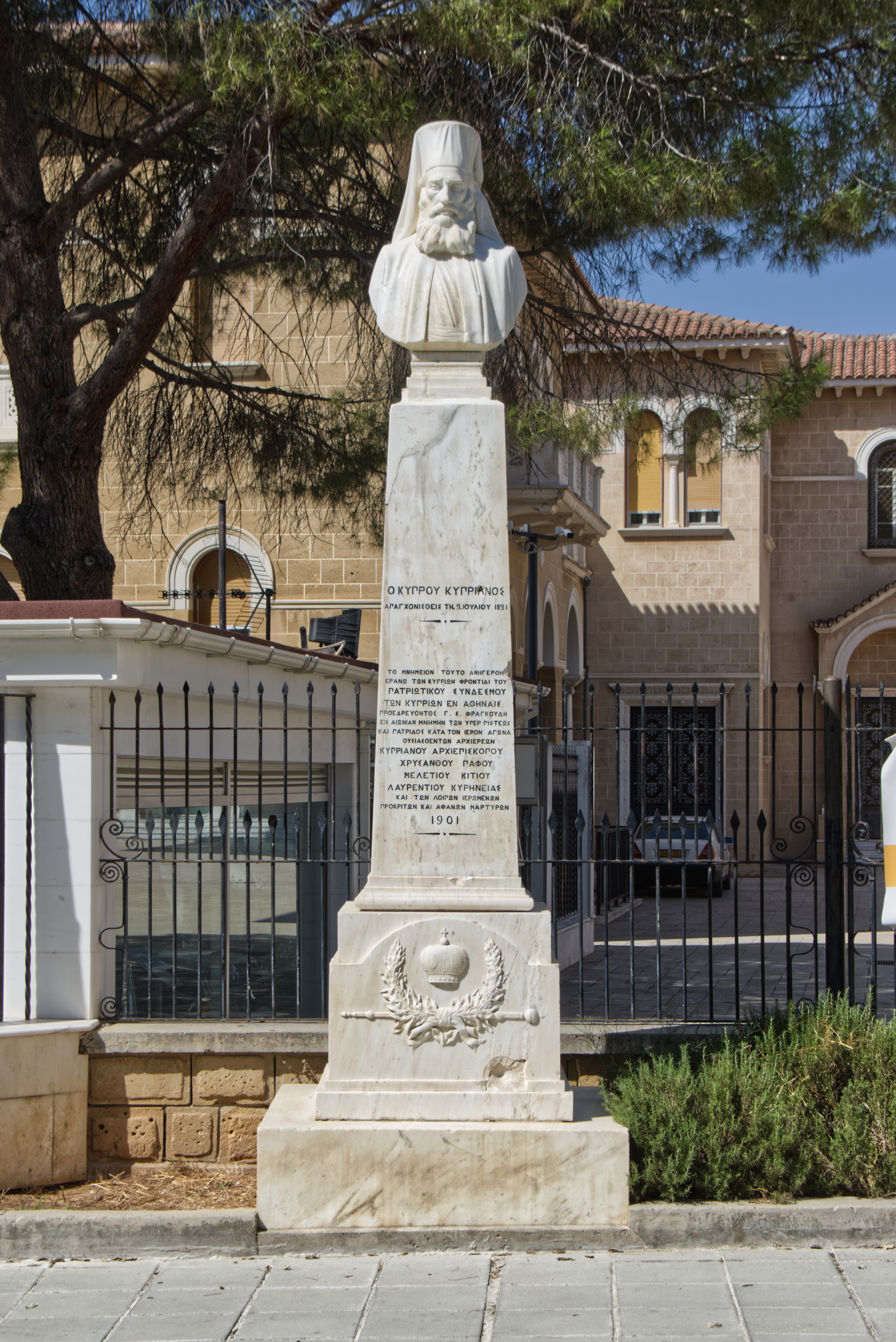
Bust of the Archbishop of Cyprus Kyprianos in Nicosia

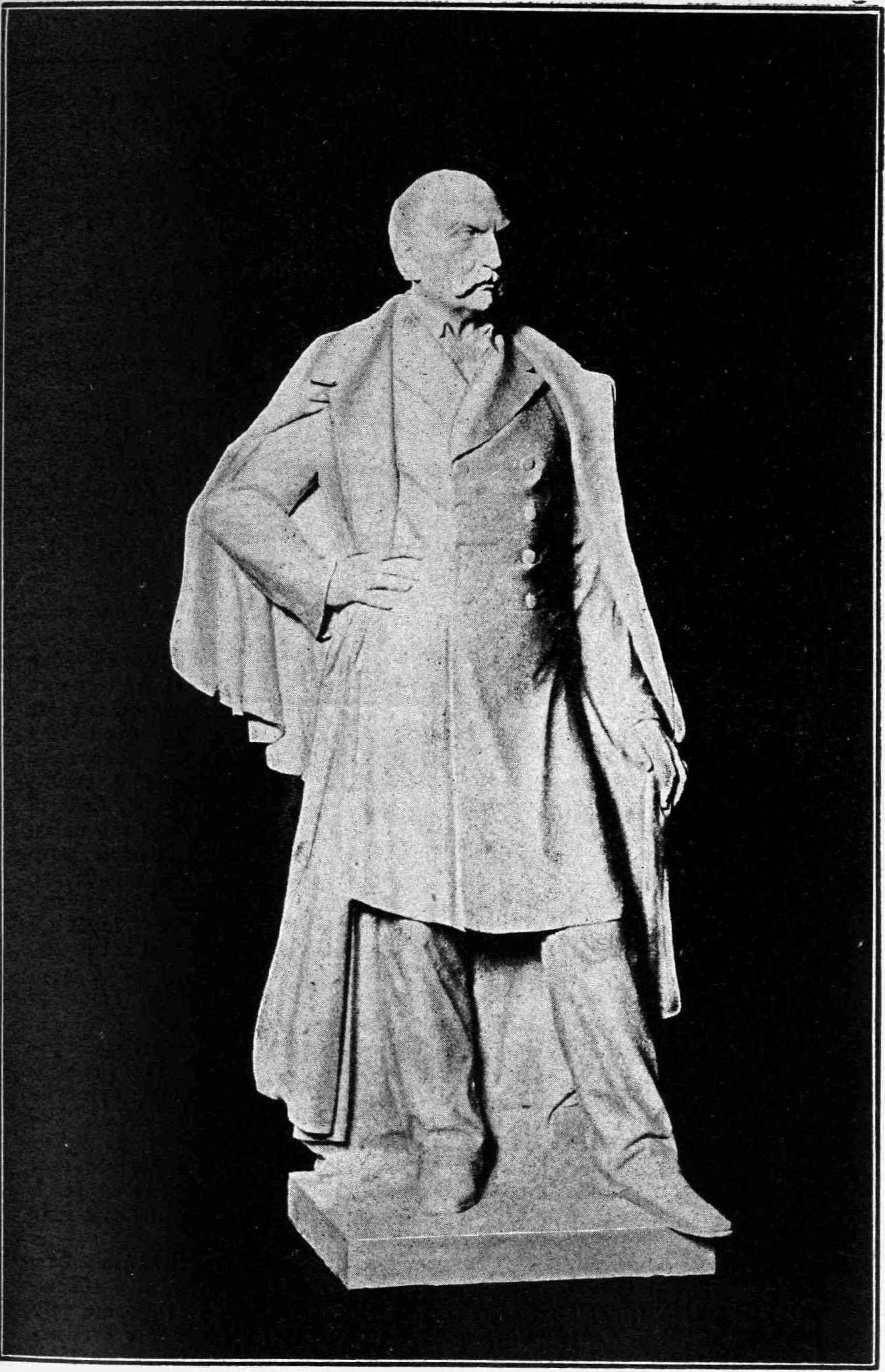
Panagiotis Ballanos

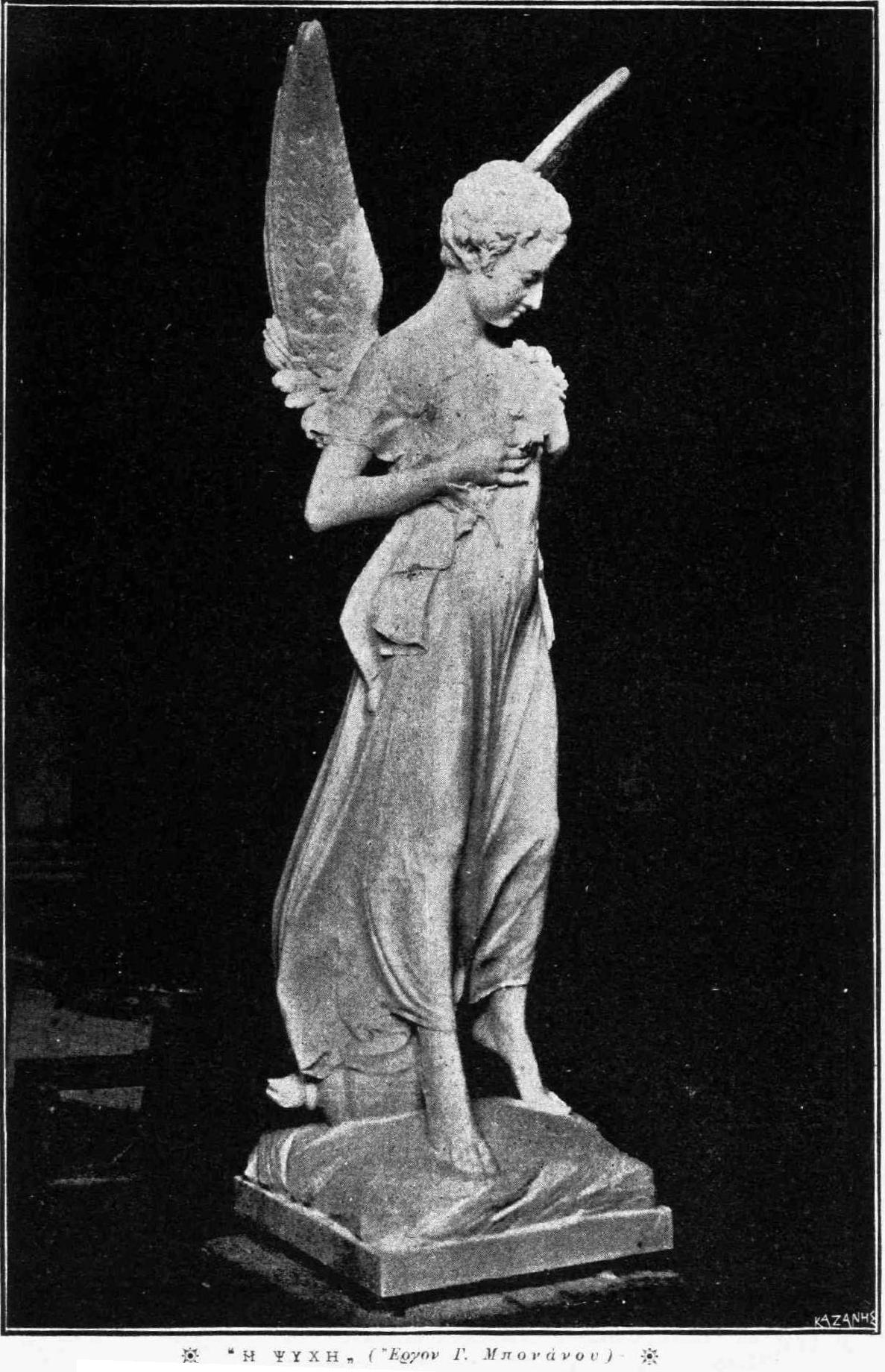
Psychi

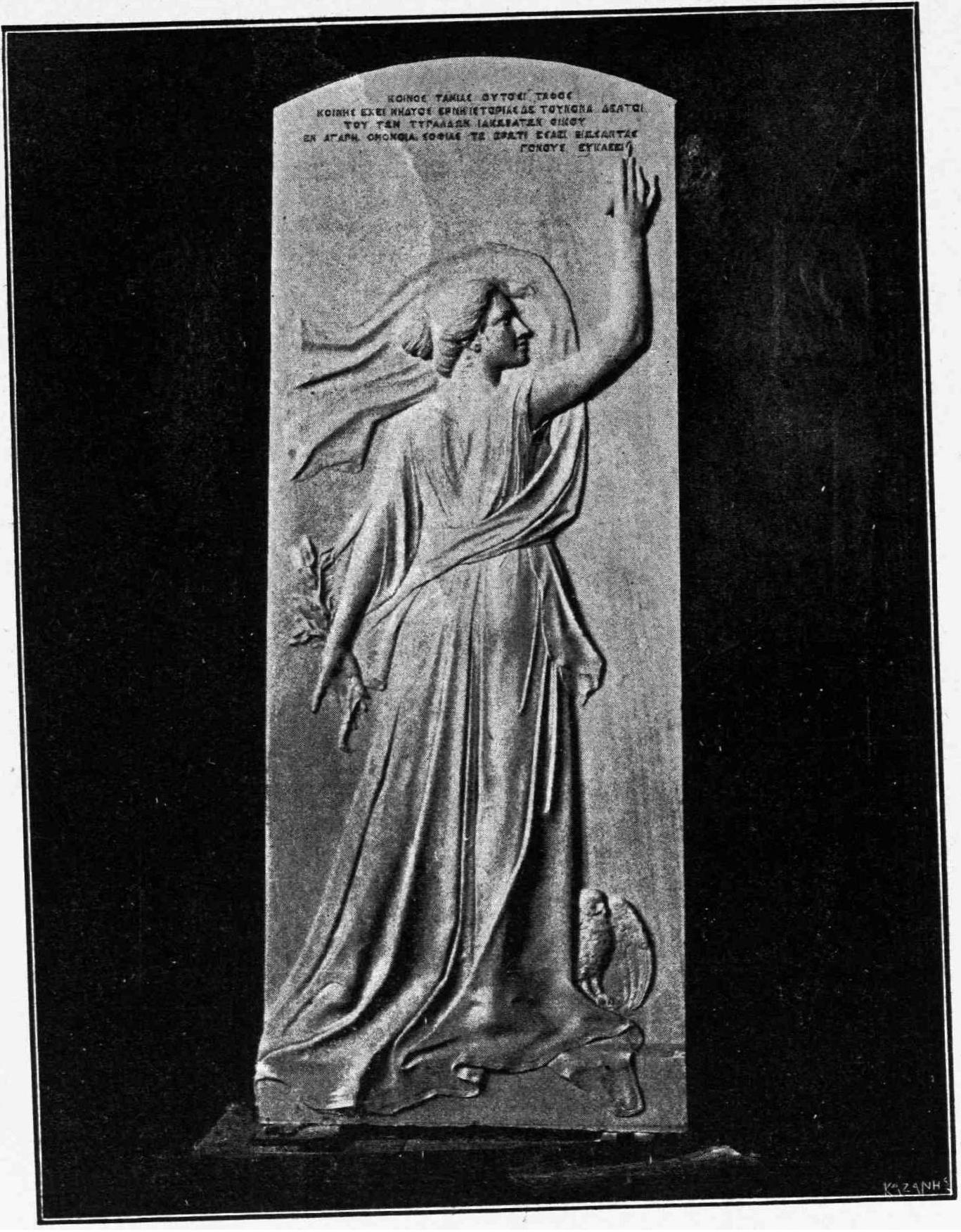
History
