= Katina Papa =

Greek writer

- Born: 1903; Janicat, Ottoman Empire (now Albania)
- Died: 1959 (aged 55–56); Athens, Greece
- Occupations: poet, novelist, short story

Katina Papa (Greek: Κατίνα Παπά; 1903–1959) was a Greek writer. She became well known for her poetry and novels.

== Life ==
She was born in the village of Janicat in the Ottoman Empire, today part of the Finiq municipality in southern Albania. Her family had to find refuge in the nearby island of Corfu because her father was accused by the local Ottoman authorities of participating in a local revolt.

Katina Papa studied at the University of Athens and then became a teacher. Her writing is associated with her experiences as a teacher. Her first book Stin sikaminia apo kato (Under the Mulberry Tree) received the Academy of Athens award. Papa's main characters are mainly girls, such as Tasoula (in a novel with the same title), a servant girl from Corfu, where she dreams to live with her godfather in Athens. She writes to him about her dreams. He answers, but the girl cannot manage to open the letter, fearing that the answer might be negative.

The distinguished author Nikos Kazantzakis said to her once, "I really admire your writing style... the sensitivity, the liveliness".

Katina Papa died in Athens in 1957 at the age of 54. After her death her sister, the painter Aglaia Papa, arranged for publication of Katina's novel S'ena gymnasio thyleon ("In a girls' high school") and a collection of Katina's poems: Poiimata (Poems).

== Works ==
- Sti sykaminia apo kato (Under the Mullbery Tree) 1935.
- An allazan ola (If Everything Changed) 1948.
- S'ena gymnasio thyleon (At a Girls' High School).
- Poiimata (Poems) 1963.

Her works have been translated into several languages.
