= Yiannis Maltezos =

Yiannis (or possibly Yannis) Maltezos (Γιάννης Μαλτέζος) (Smyrna, 1915 - Paris, 1987) was a Greek painter and visual artist who spent much of his working life in Paris.

== Personal life ==
Yiannis Maltezos was born in 1915 in the Boutzas district of Smyrna, later İzmir, Turkey.

Following the events of World War I and the Burning of Smyrna when the majority of the Greek population of Smyrna fled the city, the family first settled in Heraklion for six years, later moving to Athens.

In March 1959 he married the Greek-American Helen Kosmas (1924-2016), and they moved the same year to Paris.

Maltezos died in Paris in 1987, and is buried in Athens.

== Artistic career ==
Maltezos studied at the Athens School of Fine Arts where he attended classes while at the same time working in a private workshop.

He also worked as a set designer for the National Theatre of Greece before World War II.

After the war, he began experimenting with an abstract expressionist style, applying a 'drip technique'.

Maltezos first exhibited at the Greek National Exhibition of 1939, and his first solo exhibition was held in La Galerie Mouffe in Paris in 1962. He also took part among other things in the 1959 edition of the São Paulo Art Biennial.

Maltezos is considered one of the first artists to introduce abstract art to Greece. He later moved artistically towards gestural and abstract expressionism and op art.
