= Vangjush Mio =

Albanian painter

Vangjush Mio NK
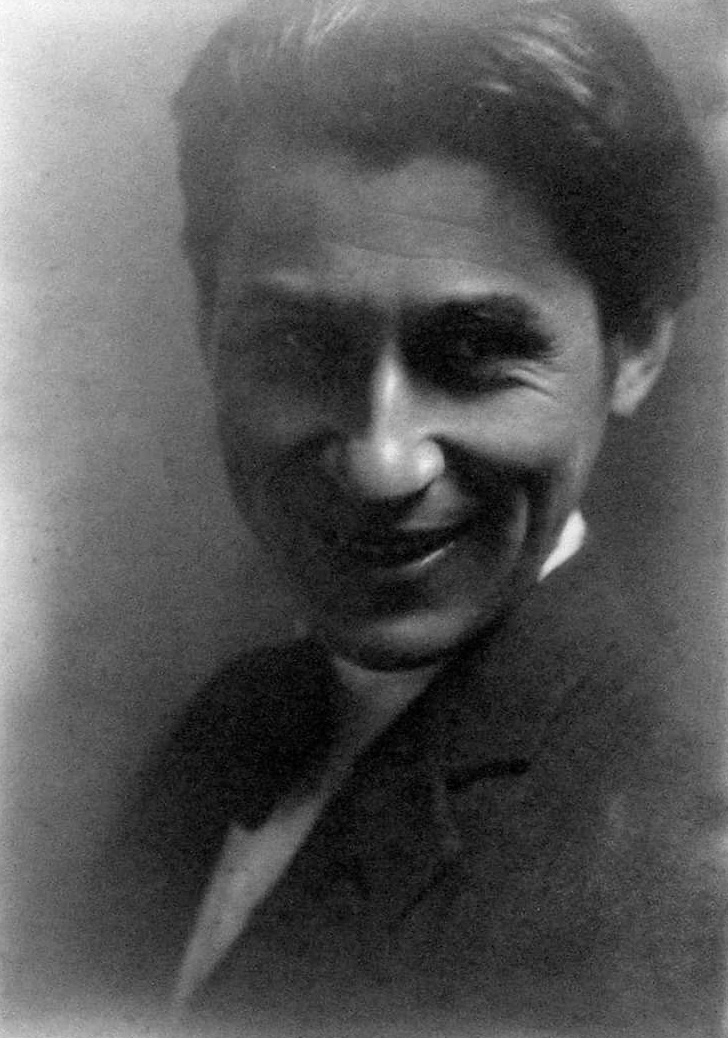
- Mio, c. 1926
- Born: 3 March 1891; Korçë, Albania, Ottoman Empire
- Died: 30 December 1957 (aged 76); Tirana, Albania
- Education: Bucharest National University of Arts, Romania; Accademia di San Luca, Italy
- Known for: Painting
- Notable work: Vjeshtë në Drenovë, Tirana
- Awards: People's Artist Honor of the Nation

Vangjush Mio (Albanian: [vaɲˈɟuʃ ˈmi.ɔ]; 3 March 1891 – 30 December 1957) was an Albanian impressionist painter. He was the brother of the Albanian film director and actor Sokrat Mio.

== Life and work ==
Mio was born on 3 March 1891 in Korçë, Albania. In 1908 due to economic reasons he had to leave together with his brother to Bucharest, Romania. He was an active member of the Albanian artist colony in the Romanian capital and in 1915 he started his studies of Fine Arts at the Bucharest National University of Arts. He successfully completed his education in 1919 and in the same year he opened his first personal exhibition in Bucharest. In 1920 he returned for a few months to his native country and exhibited his works in Korçë. This was the first art exhibition in public in the whole country. During this period, he taught the future artist Sofia Zengo Papadhimitri.

In September 1920 he went to Rome. As a great admirer of the Italian impressionists of the 19th and early 20th century, he enrolled at the Royal Academy of San Luca. However, financial problems forced him to interrupt the studies and to get back to Korçë. There he took a job as an art teacher at the French school, where he taught among other pupils the future leader of the country Enver Hoxha.

Thanks to a government scholarship, he could return to Rome and in 1924 successfully complete the studies with the graduation. After that Mio decided to return to his birthplace Korçë, which at that time was the cultural capital of Albania.

During his lifetime he participated in numerous exhibitions throughout the whole country, in 1942 even in Bari, Italy. The last exhibition organized by himself, was a retrospective of his work and took place in November 1957 in Tirana. A few days later, on 30 December 1957, Mio died in Tirana due to complications caused by jaundice.

Sources credit Vangjush Mio as the first impressionist painter of Albania. He was known especially for his landscape paintings and is considered the best Albanian landscape painter of the 20th Century. His favorite subjects were the cities Korçë, Pogradec and the surrounding area, but he immortalized in his works also other cities like Tirana, Elbasan, Himarë, Berat and Gjirokastër. However the introduction and spread of impressionism is also credited to Albania's first woman professional artist, Androniqi Zengo Antoniu.

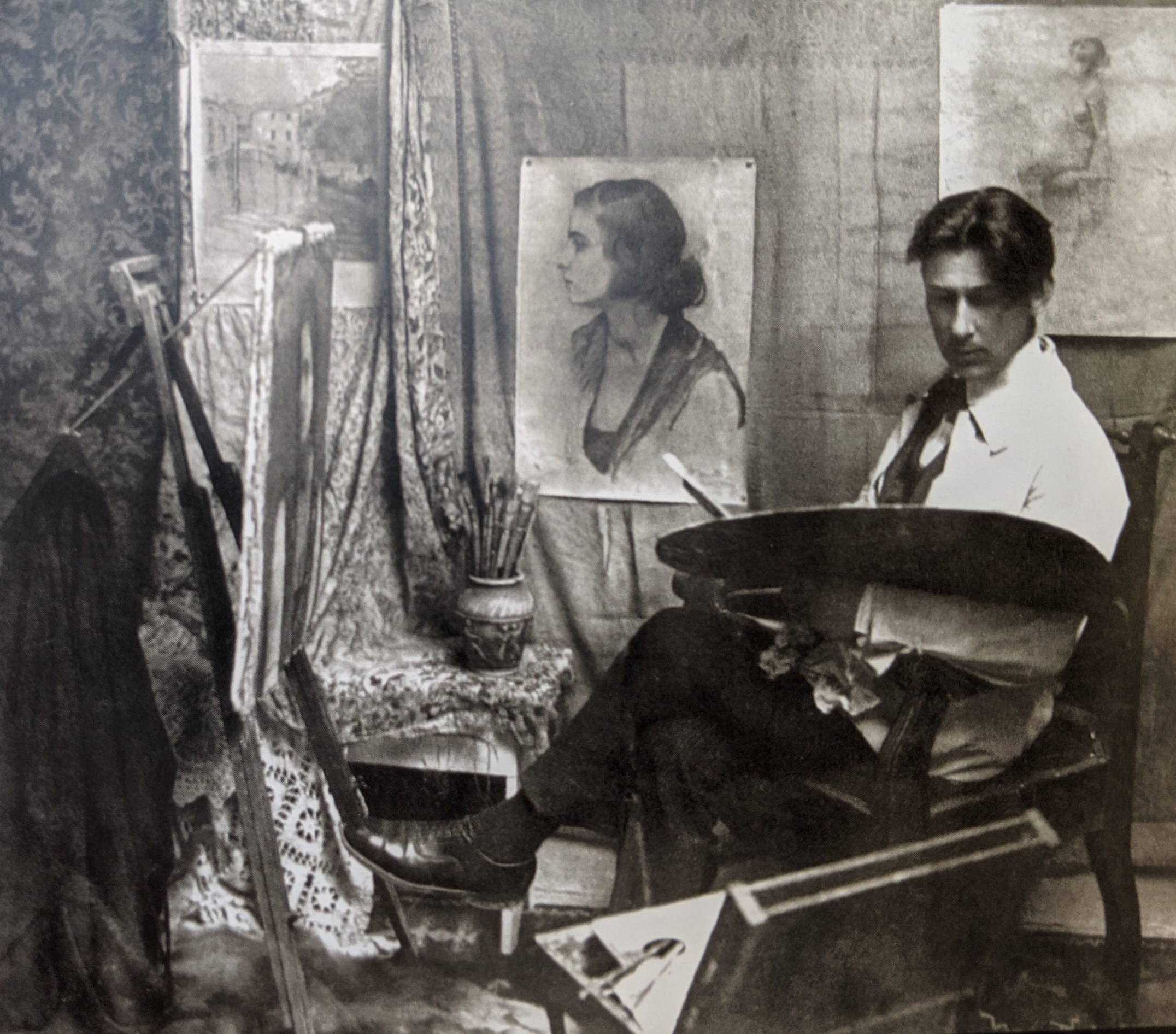
Vangjush Mio in his studio

Mio had a remarkable career as a painter and produced over 400 drawings and 130 paintings within 40 years. Among 60 items of his work can be admired at the National Gallery of Figurative Arts of Albania in Tirana. Further paintings are presented by his daughter Rozeta in his 2010 renovated house in Korçë, now known as the Museum Vangjush Mio. In 1994 twenty one paintings were stolen from that museum and are still missing. An additional 27 paintings for an estimated value of US$300,000 were reported missing in July 2012. Among the 27 missing paintings, there were some of the painter's initial works dating in the late part of the 1920s.

== Honors ==
Vangjush Mio was honored with the title Painter of the People (Piktor i Popullit).

In 1965 the Albanian documentary Vangjush Mio, piktor i popullit was produced, dealing with his life and work.

The cultural center of Korçë was named after him.

Since 2007, always at the end of October the Mio's Days Festival takes place in Korçë. During four days the city and the surrounding area are open studios and people can admire the paintings by artists from Albania and abroad . On the last day of the festival all the paintings are exhibited in the cultural center.

For some years, the winners of a nationwide competition of Fine Arts are awarded with the Vangjush Mio Price.
