= Dimitra Tserkezou =

Greek sculptor (1920–2007)

- Born: 1920; Istanbul, Ottoman Empire
- Died: 2007 (aged 86–87); Athens, Greece
- Education: Athens School of Fine Arts

Dimitra Tserkezou (1920–2007) was a Greek sculptor.

Tserkezou was born in Istanbul to a Greek family who then moved to Athens, where she graduated from the National School of Fine Arts in 1946; she went also to Milan where she practiced metal moulding art from 1966 to 1971. Her first participation was at the 4th Panhellenic Exposition in 1952 and her two first individual expositions took place in 1953 at Thessaloniki (Chamber of Commerce and Industry & 18th International Fair of Thessaloniki). Since then, she developed an artistical activity participating at many salons and expositions in Piraeus, Athens, Milan, Rome, Turin, Paris, Strasbourg, Monaco, Deauville, Biaritz, Brussels, Düsseldorf, Quebec etc.

Forty of her statues decorate public places and gardens in Greece (Athens, Syros, Chios and many other towns) as well as many collections (as for instance in Zurich, in Vatican or Washington – White House).

Her art is neorealist and figurative in a simple, expressive and dynamic construction; her compositions are full of humanism (her subjects are mostly chosen in modern everyday life); she gives life to the hard materials of marble, bronze, cement and new metals.

== Awards ==
- Silver medal (& diploma) at the International Exposition "Quadriennale d'Europa", Rome 1966.
- Silver medal (& diploma) at the International Exposition "Città del Sole", Rome 1966.
- Silver medal (& diploma) at the Exposition "Biennale d'Arte Contemporanea", Rome 1968.
- Gold medal (& diploma) by the Tommazo Campanella Academy, Rome 1972.
- Gold medal (& diploma) "Burckhardt Campidoglio d'Oro" by Bruckhardt Academy, Rome 1979.

== Memberships ==
- Associate member of the Société des Artistes Français
- member of the Association des Artistes Indépendants (Paris)
- council member of the "Επιμελητήριο Εικαστικών Τεχνών Ελλάδος" (Chamber of Plastic Arts of Greece – Athens)
- member of the Σύλλογος Ελλήνων Γλυπτών (Association of Greek Sculptors – Athens)
- honorary member of the International Academy Tommazo Campanella (Rome)
- member of Societá per le belle arti ed esposizione permanente

== Death ==
She died in 2007 in Athens, Greece.
