= Demetrios Farmakopoulos =

Greek painter (1919–1996)

- Born: Δημήτριος Φαρμακόπουλος; May 1919; Athens, Greece
- Died: 1996 (aged 76–77); Athens, Greece

Demetrios Farmakopoulos, (Δημήτριος Φαρμακόπουλος),(1919–1996), also known as Mimis Farmakopoulos. An influential Greek painter whose main recurring theme is space and the future.

== Introduction ==
Born in Athens, in 1919 and graduated from the Athens School of Fine Arts winning first prize in nude paintings.

During World War II, Farmakopoulos served in the Greek Army and later joined the group EAM during the Greek Resistance against the occupation of Greece by Nazi Germany.

Since then, Farmakopoulos had a great artistic career and numerous exhibitions in Greece and in South America, especially Brazil where he spent a number of years.

His main theme is celestial phenomena, space and the distant future.

During his stay in Brazil, he studied at the Academy of Fine Arts of Rio de Janeiro where he took courses in Interior Design and Stagecraft. Thereafter he was the head set designer for many years in television, dance halls and Brazilian Carnivals.

== Exhibitions ==
- 1949 Zappeion - Panhellenic Exhibition of Greek Crafts - Athens, Greece
- 1952 Outdoor Exhibition - Kifisia, Greece
- 1957 Salao Nacional de Belas Artes - Rio de Janeiro, Brazil
- 1958 Salao do Mar - Rio de Janeiro, Brazil
- 1958 Museu Arte Monterna - Em Goiania - Brazil
- 1959 Coletiva do Turismo - Rio de Janeiro, Brazil
- 1960 Α.Σ.Μ. - Rio de Janeiro, Brazil
- 1961 "Toca" Galeri - Rio de Janeiro, Brazil
- 1962 "Toca" Galeri - Rio de Janeiro, Brazil
- 1963 Instituto Brasil-USA - Brazil
- 1964 Casueiruem - Vitoria, Brazil
- 1966 Salao Nacional E.S. - Vitoria, Brazil
- 1967 Salao Nacional E.S. - Vitoria, Brazil
- 1967 Museu Arte Monterna - Rio de Janeiro, Brazil
- 1969 Galeri "Sao Sermain" - Rio de Janeiro, Brazil
- 1969 Galeri "Rico Rico" - Rio de Janeiro, Brazil
- 1970 Transantlantic ship "Augusto" - en route
- 1971 Piraeus Carnival - Greece
- 1972 Rotonda - Athens, Greece
- 1973 Center of Cultural Cooperation - Athens, Greece
- 1973 Panhellenic Exhibition - Athens, Greece
- 1974 New Thought - Athens, Greece
- 1974 Center of Cultural Cooperation - Athens, Greece
- 1975 Panhellenic Exhibition - Athens, Greece
- 1975 New Thought - Athens, Greece
- 1975 Ministry of Culture - Week of Art - Athens, Greece
- 1976 New Thought - Athens, Greece
- 1976 EPASKT - Athens, Greece
- 1977 "Dawn" Festival - Athens, Greece
- 1978 Firka Museum - Panhellenic Painting Exhibition - Chania, Greece
- 1978 Athens Cultural Center - 2001 - Athens, Greece
- 1979 O.S.E. - Athens, Greece
- 1980 Gallery "Simvoli" - Athens, Greece
- 1980 Gallery "Modern Art Team" - Athens, Greece
- 1980 KNE Festival - Peristeri, Greece
- 1981 Cooperative of Artists - Athens, Greece
- 1981 Patissia Artists - Civilizing Movement - Athens, Greece
- 1986 Athens, Greece
- 1998 Gallery "Artbus" - Chalandri, Greece
- 2002 Gallery "Antinor" - Athens, Greece

== Sources ==
- "Messages from Space" - 2002
- "Εικόνες από το παρελθόν "τα μαγαζιά της συνοικίας" στην Πινακοθήκη "Ψυχάρη 36" | Kathimerini".
- "emotivo | pasya.gr". www.pasya.gr.
- "Η συλλογή των έργων των αποφοίτων της Α.Σ.Κ.Τ." artcatalogue.asfa.gr. Archived from the original on 2016-03-04.
