= Aglaia Papa =

Greek painter (1904–1984)

- Αγλαΐα Παπά
- Self-Portrait (1932) National Gallery (Athens)
- Born: 1904; Corfu, Greece
- Died: 1984 (aged 79–80); Piraeus, Greece
- Other names: Greek: Αγλαΐα Παπά
- Known for: Painter

Aglaia Papa (Greek: Αγλαΐα Παπά, 1904–84) was a Greek painter.

== Life ==
Aglaia Papa was born in Corfu in 1904. Her family lived in Janicat, then in the Ottoman Empire, now in Albania. Her older sister Katina Papa (1903–57) would become a well-known author. When she was a teenager the Papa family fled persecution by Turks and Albanians in the region and settled in Corfu. She attended courses in painting in Corfu with Marco Zavitzianos and Konstantinos Parthenis. She studied at the Athens School of Fine Arts under Nikolaos Lytras, Konstantinos Parthenis and Thomas Thomopoulos. After graduating she continued to study in Trieste, Milan and Vienna, where she took classes in art history. She returned to Greece and became a teacher of painting and decorative arts at the Vocational School of Amalieiou Orphanage. After the death of her sister Katina she arranged for publication of Katina's novel "In a girls' high school" and a collection of Katina's poems. Aglaia Papa died in Piraeus in 1984.

== Work ==
Papa was a prolific artist whose work was well received by contemporary critics. She held several solo exhibitions, and she participated in group exhibitions including the Venice Biennale (1934 and 1936) and Alexandria (1957). Her earlier work was mainly landscapes and portraits. Later she produced purely abstract compositions. Her Self-Portrait (1932) is on display at the National Gallery in Athens. 23 of her paintings are held by the Municipal Gallery of Corfu. The Municipal Art Gallery of Ioannina also holds some of her work.

== Publications ==
- Katina Papa (2000), Στη συκαμιά από κάτω (Under the Mullbery Tree), Aglaia Papa, illustrator, Βιβλιοπωλείον της Εστίας

== Sources ==
- Δημοτική Πινακοθήκη (in Greek), Municipality of Ioannina, archived from the original on 2015-09-18
- "Municipal Gallery of Corfu", Odysseus, Ministry of Culture, archived from the original on 2013-09-22
- Παπά Αγλαΐα (in Greek), National Gallery of Greece, archived from the original on 2016-02-25
- "Παπά, Κατίνα Γ., 1903-1957", BiblioNet (in Greek), archived from the original on 2016-03-01
