= Androniqi Zengo Antoniu =

Albanian impressionist painter and iconographer

- Antoniu on a 2023 stamp of Albania with her 1935 self-portrait in background
- Born: Androniqi Zengo; 26 May 1913; Dardhë, Independent Albania
- Died: 10 February 2000 (aged 86)
- Education: Athens School of Fine Arts
- Occupation: Painter
- Known for: First Albanian woman to work as a professional artist
- Style: Impressionism
- Spouse: Kristaq Antoniu (m. 1941; died 1979)
- Relatives: Sofia Zengo Papadhimitri (sister)

Androniqi Zengo Antoniu (née Zengo; 26 May 1913 – 10 February 2000) was an Albanian painter. She is considered to be the first professional woman painter from Albania, along with her sister Sofia Zengo Papadhimitri, and with Vangjush Mio is credited with the introduction of impressionism to the country.

== Biography ==
Antoniu was born on 26 May 1913 in Dardhë, now part of Korçë, less than a year after the Albanian Declaration of Independence, and was the daughter of the icon painter Vangjel Zengo. Her sister Sofia was born in 1915. She graduated with honours in painting and sculpture from the Athens School of Fine Arts. After studying in Paris, she returned to Albania to teach at the Nëna Mbretëreshë Pedagogical Institute. A painter mainly of impressionist portraits and landscapes, as well as icons; her sister was strongly influenced by realism. She is credited as Albania's first professional woman painter.

In the late 1930s she is purported to have had an affair with the poet Lasgush Poradeci. In 1941 she married the singer Kristaq Antoniu.

During her lifetime, Zengo Antoniu had at least three solo exhibitions. Her first in 1935; her second in 1937 - to mark the 25th anniversary of the founding of Albania. She also took part in various group exhibitions, including one in New York in 1939. In 1963 she exhibited at the Alexandria Biennale, and was awarded two medals. She also worked alongside her father and painted several churches in her hometown, in Tirana and other places in Albania. In 1964 she painted the Vangjelizmo Church in Tirana.

She died on 10 February 2000. Alongside Vangjush Mio, Zengo Antoniu is credited with the introduction of impressionism to Albania.

== Legacy ==
Zengo Antoniu's surviving body of work consists of over 500 pieces. There are 55 of her works in the collection of the Albanian National Museum of Fine Arts. Her works have featured in several retrospectives. In 2013 she featured in an exhibition examining the work of both her family, Zengo, and that of the Antoniu family. In 2017, works by her were posthumously presented at documenta 14.

According to art historians Shpresa Tolaj Gjonbalaj and Rregjina Gokaj, her works are part of the canon of second generation of Albanian art.

One of the streets in Tirana's Laprakë district is named after her.
