= Heleni Polichronatou =

Greek sculptor, art historian (born 1959)

- Born: Ελένη Πολυχρονάτου; 1959 (age 66–67); Piraeus, Greece
- Education: Athens School of Fine Arts

Dr Heleni Polichronatou (born 27 January 1959, in Piraeus, Greece; Greek: Ελένη Πολυχρονάτου) is a Greek painter, sculptor and art historian.

== Biography ==
Polichronatou studied at the Athens School of Fine Arts, receiving a degree in painting in 1985 and another in sculpture in 1994. Her doctorate, entitled Art Work of Big Scale in the Urban and Natural Space, from the decade of 60s up to the 21st Century and written under the supervision of Dimitris Mytaras, was awarded in 2007, and published as a book in 2012.

Polichronatou has presented her work in over 100 art exhibitions in Greece and abroad, including 13 solo exhibitions. She has taken part in international events including the UNESCO-sponsored cultural and pedagological programme Communication-Art (2002-2003), and is a member of the pan-Mediterranean network "Woman-Art-Mediterranean", which organised a series of conferences on the role of women artists in promoting education and peace.

In 2013, she organized the public art project Hangers (2013); Greek: Κρεμάστρες, a project in which she recruited 50 artists to create simple sculptures to be displayed in public spaces in various districts of Athens which would provide spaces for members of the public to donate items such as clothes, toys, books or food and to take items they needed.

Her art deals with themes of the relationship between text and image, the environment, public and private space, education, and social problems. In 2021 she held a digital solo exhibition entitled Inside – Outside art @ coronavirus time inspired by her experience of the COVID-19 lockdown in Greece in the winter of 2020-21.
