= Maria Maragkoudaki =

Greek artist

- Born: Maria Maragkoudaki; Chania, Crete, Greece
- Occupation: Painter
- Years active: 1990–present
- Spouse: (m. 2002)
- Website: www.maria-maragkoudaki.gr

Maria Maragkoudaki is a Greek artist from Chania, Crete interested in realistic pictures.

== Biography ==
Maria Maragkoudaki, was born in Chania on the island of Crete. She studied at the Athens School of Fine Arts, with Dimitris Mytaras as her professor, and graduated in 1998. She received master's degree in 2005 from the National and Kapodistrian University of Athens. She studied Byzantine painters of the 14th century in Western Crete. The title of the dissertation is "The murals of the church of Panagia Skafidianis (1347) in Prodromi Selino and the painter ioakeim".

== Exhibitions ==
=== Personal exhibitions ===
2003 Gallery Ersi.

2009 Gallery Adam, Personal Affairs.

2010 Gallery Mylonogianni, City of Chania and others Portraits.

=== Group exhibitions ===
2003 Rethymnon Centre for Contemporary Art "Oikade"

2009 CHAMBER OF FINE ARTS "The Human Form in Art"

2010 International Exhibition of art works "The ancient olive groves of Crete at a depth of time"

2010 Municipal Art Gallery of Chania "Art and Place, 52 Contemporary artists from Chania"

== Research ==
- Athens School of Fine Arts Model of Ecology.
