= Pjetër Dungu =

Albanian musician

Pjetër Dungu (1908–1989) was an Albanian piano accompanist and composer-arranger of urban folk music. He is known in the history of the music of Albania as the first compiler of Albanian folk songs.

Dungu was born in Shkodër, where he took music lessons from composer Martin Gjoka. He played oboe and trumpet, while studying piano and harmony.

In the 1930s, Dungu gained a reputation as a piano accompanist for urban lyric song, reaching a height around the end of the decade. In 1940, Dungu published Lyra Shqiptare (Albanian Lyra), the first collection of 50 folk melodies. The compilation was published by Instituto Geografico De Agostini, Novara, in Italy. This volume, with the preface by Prof. Kristaq Antoniu, contains; 19 folk songs from Shkodra, 15 folk songs from Korça, 7 folk songs from Kosovo, 5 folk songs from Berat, 2 folk songs from Elbasan, 1 folk song from Durres and 1 folk song from Vlorë. In 1942, he accompanied tenor Kristaq Antoniu on the piano for eight songs recorded for the Columbia Recording Company in Italy. Dungu also conducted an orchestra for seven of Antoniu's recordings.

Other composer-arrangers in Albanian lyric folk music in this period, include Lola Gjoka and Kristo Kono.
