= Sofia Zengo Papadhimitri =

Albanian painter

- Papadhimitri and her 1939 self-portrait on a 2023 stamp of Albania
- Born: Sofia Zengo; March 19, 1915; Korçë, Principality of Albania
- Died: June 13, 1976 (aged 61); Tirana, PR Albania
- Education: Athens School of Fine Arts
- Occupation: Painter
- Known for: Early Albanian woman painter
- Spouse: Akile Papadhimitri (m. 1947)
- Relatives: Androniqi Zengo Antoniu (sister)

Sofia Zengo Papadhimitri (née Zengo; 19 March 1915 – 13 June 1976), also simply Sofia Papadhimitri, was an Albanian painter who, with her sister Androniqi Zengo Antoniu, is credited as one of Albania's first professional women painters.

== Biography ==
Sofia Zengo was born on 19 March 1915 in Korçë to an artistic family. She was the daughter of Vangjel Zengo, an iconographer, and his wife Vasiliqa. She took her first drawing lessons in Korçë under the supervision of Vangjush Mio. In 1934, she went with her sister to study at the Athens School of Fine Arts. In 1939, she graduated with honours for painting, in the class of the famous Greek impressionist, Spiros Vikatos. During her studies, together with her father, she painted the interior of the Holy Trinity Church in Korçë.

During the Second World War, she painted icons and portraits. After the end of the war, she moved to Tirana, where she worked as a drawing teacher at a school. In 1947, she married the sculptor Akile Papadhimitri, with whom she had two sons, Jani and Evangjel.

From 1945 to 1971 her paintings were displayed at nine exhibitions of Albanian art. In 1965, on the 50th anniversary of the artist's birth, an exhibition of her works was organized at the headquarters of the League of Writers and Artists of Albania. In 1971 she retired from teaching. She died in Tirana on 13 June 1976.

== Legacy ==
Alongside her sister Androniqi Zengo Antoniu, she is considered as one of Albania's first women-painters. Her body of work includes over 300 oil paintings of portraits and landscapes, as well as over 200 charcoal drawings, many of which are held in private collections outside Albania.

An exhibition of her work was organized in 2015 by the National Museum of Fine Arts (Albania). It included oil paintings, as well as works on paper, and covered works produced between 1936 and 1971. The same year, the city council of Korçë honoured her with post-humous, honorary citizenship.

In 2020, her drawings were included in an exhibition on works on paper in Vlorë. According to art historians Shpresa Tolaj Gjonbalaj and Rregjina Gokaj, her works are part of the canon of second generation of Albanian art.
