= Kristaq Antoniu =

Romanian actor and singer (1907–1979)

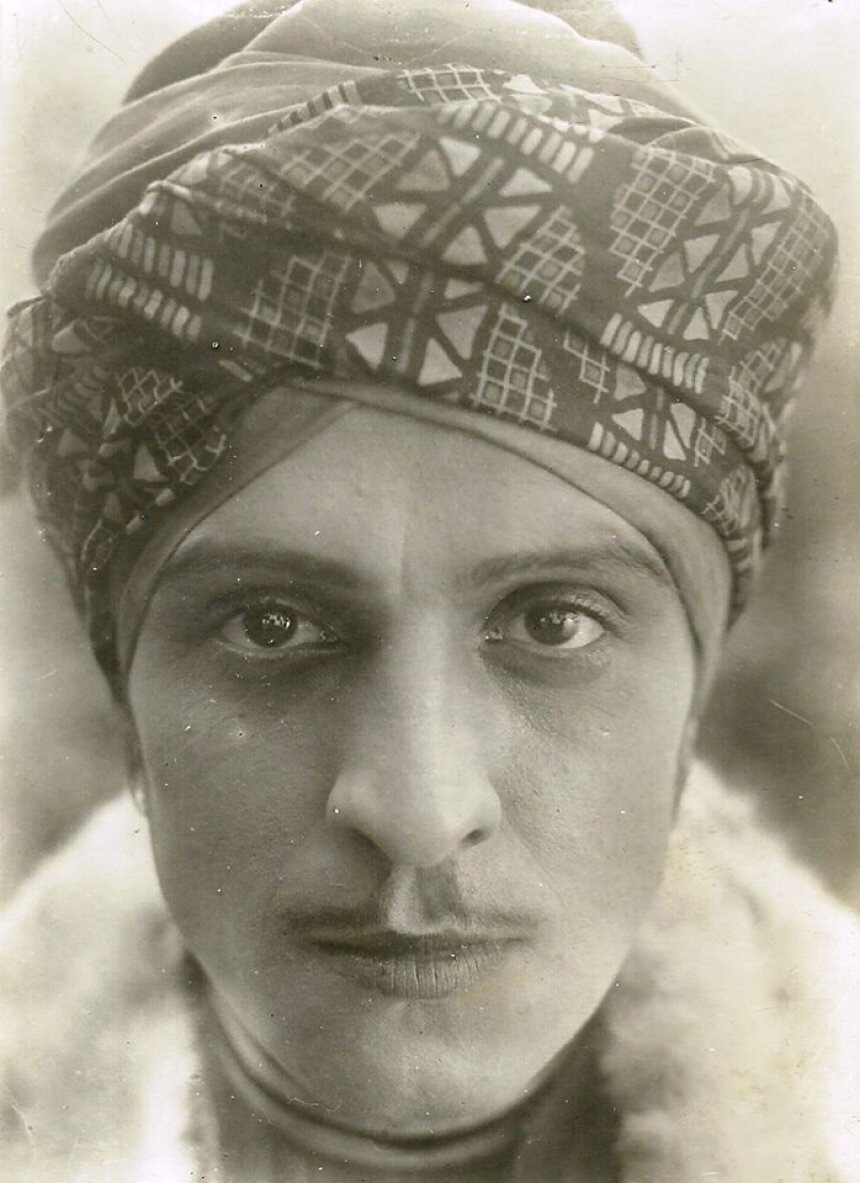
- Antoniu in 1939
- Born: 25 December 1907; Bucharest, Kingdom of Romania
- Died: 17 March 1979 (aged 71); Tirana, PSR Albania
- Other name: Cristache Antoniu
- Citizenship: Romania; Albania
- Education: Centro Sperimentale di Cinematografia
- Occupations: Tenor; Baritone; Actor
- Years active: 1927–1970
- Spouse: Androniqi Zengo (m. 1941)
- Awards: People's Artist

Kristaq Antoniu (Albanian pronunciation: [kɾisˈtac antɔˈni.u]; 25 December 1907 – 17 March 1979), also known as Cristache Antoniu (Romanian pronunciation: [krisˈtake antoˈni.u]), was an Albanian-Romanian operetta tenor, baritone, and actor. He was a People's Artist of the People's Republic of Albania.

== Biography ==
Born in Bucharest, the capital of Romania, to an ethnic Albanian family, he lived in Romania, graduating from the Mimic Drama College of Bucharest and the Centro Sperimentale di Cinematografia in Rome. He acquired much of his celebrity by acting in Romanian cinema roles during the late 1920s and early 1930s.

As a concert master and operetta singer, he toured Europe with a group of musicians. He settled in Albania in 1935, and started to expand on his artistic reputation, being widely esteemed for his accomplished interpretation of classical arias and folk songs. A recording of folk songs done for the Columbia society in 1942 was largely arranged by Pjetër Dungu. Antoniu was the director of the first Albanian opera, Mrika, composed by Prenk Jakova.

Antoniu died in Tirana.

== Personal life ==
In 1941 he married Albania's first professional woman artist, Androniqi Zengo Antoniu.
