= Nella Golanda =

Greek artist, sculptor, landscape and architectural designer

Nella Golanda (Greek: Νέλλα Γκόλαντα; 1941–2023) was a Greek artist whose practice encompassed sculpture, landscape design, architecture and urban design. She developed an approach she called "inhabited sculpted landscapes", in which sculptural form is integrated into public space so that it is experienced by visitors from within, rather than viewed as a discrete object. From 1995, she collaborated with her daughter and fellow architect, Aspasia Kouzoupi, on large-scale public projects the two described as "sculpted architectural landscapes".

She received the Archisearch Lifetime Achievement Award at ESO 2022. She was also a finalist for the Rosa Barba 1 Prize at the International Landscape Biennale of Barcelona.

== Early life and education ==
Golanda began her studies in the late 1950s at the Athens School of Fine Arts, where she trained in engraving under Konstantinos Grammatopoulos. She also studied mosaics, before moving towards work that combined sculpture with architecture. This early grounding in mosaics anticipated the way her later landscape works build large compositions with stone, concrete and timber.

== Career ==
Starting her career with individual artworks, including the engraving series Hellenic Space I–XVII (1966–1970, shown at the 9th Mediterranean Biennale in Alexandria in 1970.), she explored themes regarding Hellenic identity.

From the 1970s, she moved towards large-scale public interventions, applying what she termed a "total art" approach that reworked the relationship between public space, architecture and the surrounding landscape. She merged sculpture and landscape design into what she called "inhabited sculpted landscapes". These interventions were meant to allow visitors to experience art from inside it.

Although from a later generation and coming from a different discipline, she shared interests and techniques with predecessors like architect Dimitris Pikionis. She also worked in an atypical way with the themes of reconnection to historical landscapes and with the relationship between sky, terrain, and the sea. This was through geometric shapes and patterns growing out of the landscape. Golanda described her vision of Greece as a landscape envisioned as a series of terraces towards the sea.

From 1995, Golanda worked in partnership with the architect Aspasia Kouzoupi, her daughter; the two co-founded the practice "sculpted architectural landscapes".

A monograph on her work, Γλυπτική και αρχιτεκτονική της Νέλλας Γκόλαντα ("The sculpture and architecture of Nella Golanda"), was published by Olkos in 1982. Golanda's work is also the subject of a thesis study by the historian Ekaterini Tzamou, published in 2020.

== Selected works ==
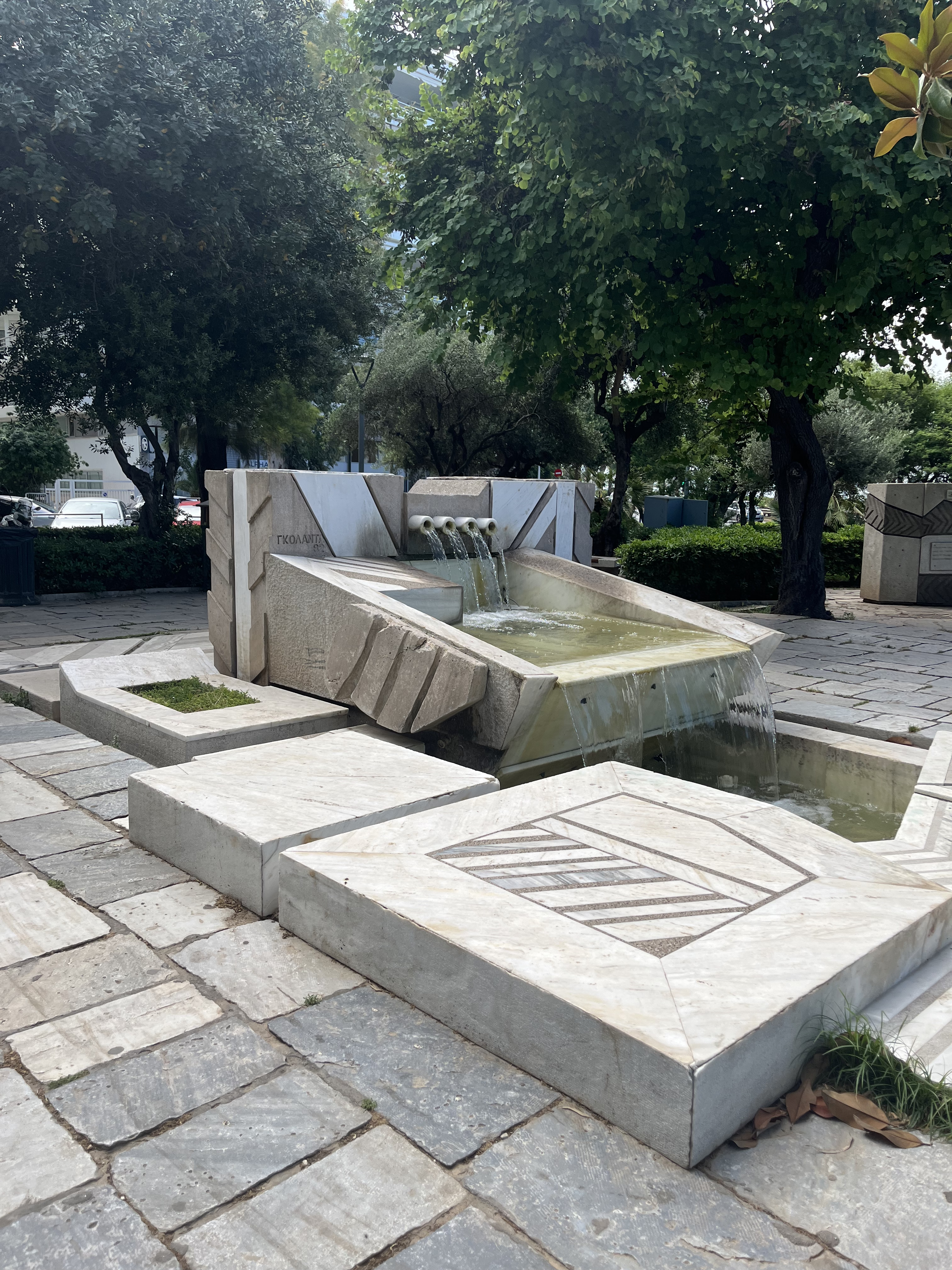

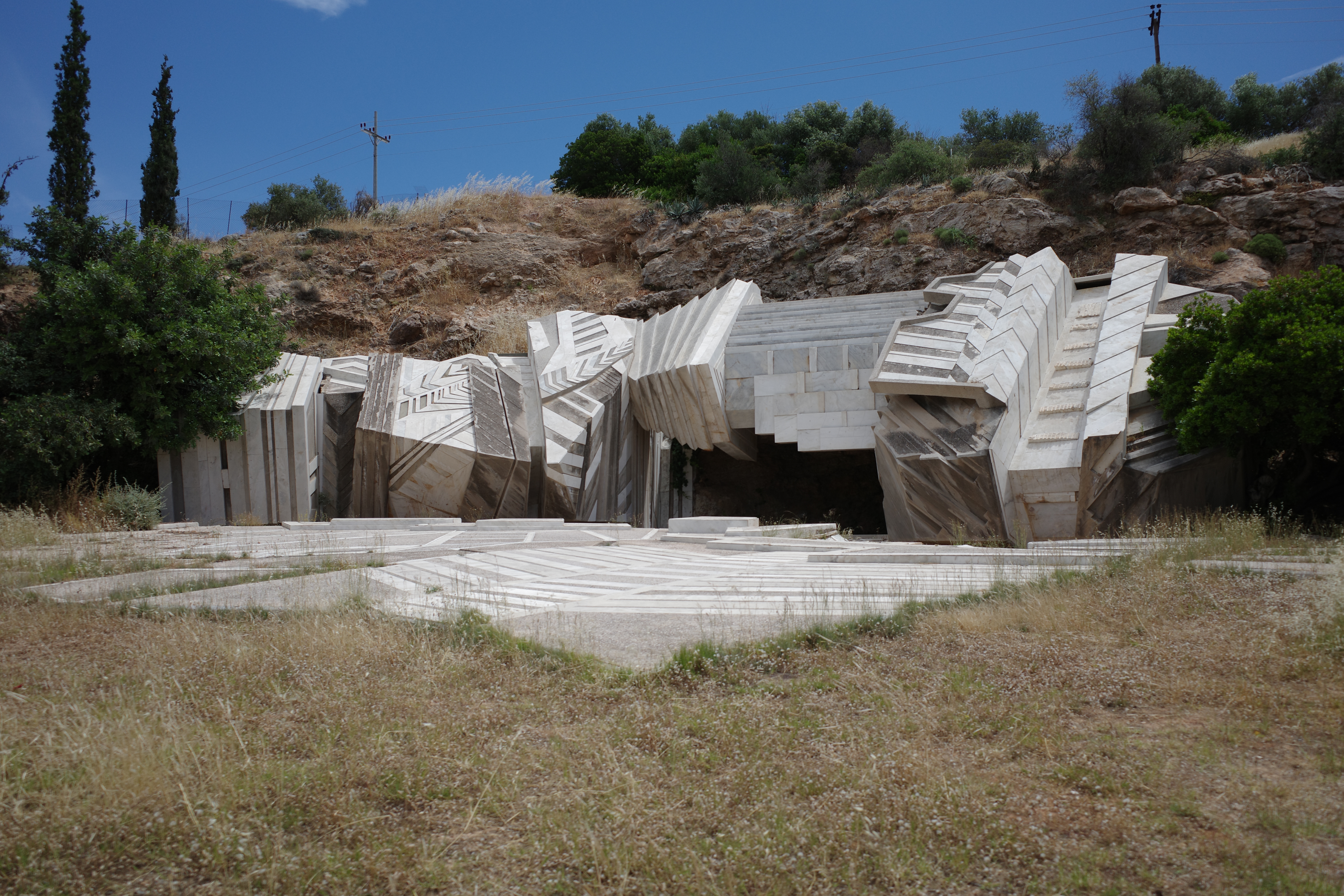

- Flivos Square in Paleo Faliro(1976-78)
- Flivos Central Quay (1984-86)
- Aixoni Quarry Sculpted Theatre (1984-92)
- Larissa city masterplan and landscaping, 1992-1998 & 2006: following the river, selected for the Council of Europe Landscape Prize
- Old Dionyssos Quarry (1995-97), a finalist project for the 1st Rosa Barba Prize at the International Landscape Biennial of Barcelona
- Glyfada Katakri Central Square (2006), won first honourable mention at the category "Best Executed Work 2008-2010" at the Domes 2011 Awards

== Death ==
Golanda died in May 2023.
