= Aggelika Korovessi =

Greek conceptual sculptor

- Αγγέλικα Κοροβέση
- Born: Pyrgos, Elis, Peloponnese, Greece
- Education: Athens School of Fine Arts
- Known for: Sculpture
- Website: www.aggelikakorovessi.com

Aggelika Korovessi (Greek: Αγγέλικα Κοροβέση) is a Greek conceptual sculptor known for her work based on sound waves of spoken words. She lives and works in Athens, Greece.

== Biography ==
Her works have been exhibited widely in Greece and abroad, and are included in museum and public and private collections internationally.

Korovessi studied from 1970 to 1975 at the Athens School of Fine Arts under various teacher sculptors including Dimitri Kalamara. From 1985 she became specifically interested in the sound analysis of words, inspired by the work of Iannis Xenakis. Korovessi begun to create works that show the use of technology, music and science, resulting eventually in the 'sound-sculptures' which were later called SonArt.

In 2008, Korovessi was awarded the Silver Olympic Medal Award in the International "Olympic Spirit in Beijing 2008" Sculpture Competition.

From July 5 - September 1, 2013 the artist opened her exhibition at the National Archeological Museum of Athens, Greece titled Retrospective: Time, Form, Concept. This was the first contemporary art exhibition to place works amongst the museum's permanent collection.

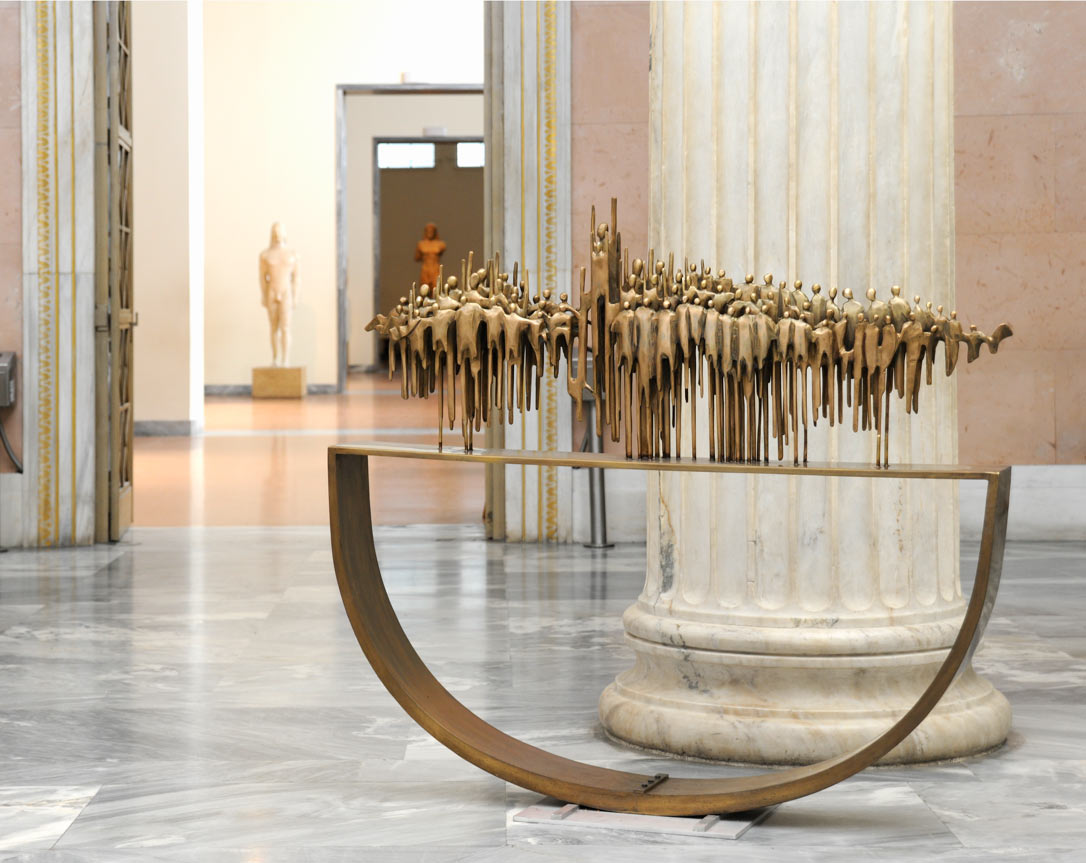
'Irini (Peace) A' by Aggelika Korovessi in the vestibule of the National Archaeological Museum of Athens during the 'Time, Form, Concept' exhibition, Athens, 2013

== Notable exhibitions ==
1994

- 4th Sculpture Triennial, representing Greece, France

2001

- John F. Kennedy Center for the Performing Arts, 'Connecting Worlds', Washington, USA

2013

- National Archaeological Museum, Athens, 'Time, Form, Concept', Athens, Greece

== Notable public works ==
- 'Communication', 1988, intersection of Mesogeion Avenue and Katechaki Avenue, Athens, Greece
- 'National Resistance Monument', 1997, Karakolithos, Viotia, Greece
- 'Le chemin de l'eau', 2013, SIAAP plant, France
