= Thalia Flora-Karavia =

Greek artist (1871–1960)

- Θάλεια Φλωρά-Καραβία
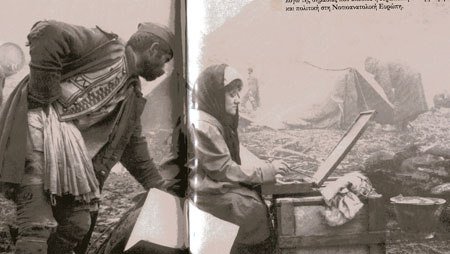
- Thalia Flora-Karavia sketching on the Balkan front, 1912–13
- Born: 1871; Siatista, Western Macedonia, Greece
- Died: 1960 (aged 88–89); Athens, Greece
- Other names: Greek: Θάλεια Φλωρά-Καραβία
- Occupation: Artist
- Known for: War sketches

Thalia Flora-Karavia (Greek: Θάλεια Φλωρά-Καραβία, 1871–1960) was a Greek artist and member of the Munich School who was best known for her sketches of soldiers at war.

== Life ==
Thalia Flora was born in 1871 in Siatista, Western Macedonia. In 1874 she moved with her family to Istanbul. There she obtained a scholarship that let her study from 1883 to 1888 at the Zappeion School for Girls. After graduating she worked as a teacher for a year. She decided to study painting and in 1895 moved to Munich where she worked with Georgios Jakobides (1853–1932) and Nikolaos Gyzis (1842–1901). As a woman she was unable to attend the Munich Academy of Fine Arts, but instead took courses in design and painting in a private school. She studied beside artists such as Nikolaos Vokos (1859–1902), Paul Nauen (1859–1932), Anton Ažbe (1862–1905) and Walter Thor (1870–1929). She returned to Istanbul in 1898, then went back to Munich until 1900.

Flora traveled to various cities in Europe. In 1906 she staged a joint exhibition in Athens with Sophia Laskaridou. While visiting Egypt in 1907 she married the journalist Nicholas Karavia. She made Alexandria her home for the next thirty years. She founded and ran an art school there. During the Balkan Wars of 1912–13 she decided to follow the Greek troops as correspondent for the Alexandrian newspaper directed by her husband. Her drawings recorded the lives of the troops, refugees and casualties in an almost impressionist style. They were published in the 1936 book Impressions of the 1912–1913 war in Macedonia and Epirus. She also recorded the Asia Minor Campaign of 1921 and the Albanian Front during the Greco-Italian War of 1940–41.

In 1940 Flora-Karavia moved to Greece, where she lived for the remainder of her life. She died in Athens in 1960.

== Work ==
Thalia Flora began to exhibit her work in 1898, and was shown in many solo and group exhibition in Greece and other countries, including the "Parnassus" at the Exposition Universelle of 1900 in Paris, Istanbul in 1901 and 1902, Athens in 1903. Cairo in 1909, Rome in 1911 and the Venice Biennale in 1934.

Thalia Flora-Karavia's work includes a wide range of themes including portraits, landscapes, still lifes, genre scenes and book illustrations. At first she followed the conservative rules of the academy, but later adopted concepts from Impressionism and Plein air painting.

The War Museum of Athens has a large collection of watercolor drawings and pastels by Flora-Karavia from the Balkan Wars and the Greek war in Asia Minor in 1921. The sketches depict the campaigning at Emin Aga in February 1913, an improvised hospital at Philippiada, watering the horses, portable bread ovens, King Constantine I of Greece and his staff and so on.

About 70 of her war sketches were purchased from the artist in 1957 and donated to the Municipal Art Gallery of Ioannina.

== Sources ==
- Arta Greece (2012-10-26), Φλωρά-Καραβία Θάλια – Thalia Flora-Karavia [1871-1960] (in Greek)
- Flora - Karavia Thalia (1871-1960), Municipal Art Gallery of Larissa G.I. Katsigras Museum
- Λασκαρίδου Σοφία (in Greek), National Gallery of Greece, archived from the original on 2016-03-01
- Smith, Michael Llewellyn (2004), Athens: A Cultural and Literary History, Signal Books, ISBN 978-1-902669-81-6
- Συλλογή Σχεδίων Θάλειας-Φλωρά Καραβία (in Greek), Municipal Art Gallery of Ioannina, archived from the original on 2019-03-28
- http://www.nationalgallery.gr/en/painting-permanent-exhibition/painter/flora-karavia-thaleia.html
