= City of Athens Cultural Center =

Cultural center in Athens, Greece

Coordinates: 37°58′53.2″N 23°44′7″E

The City of Athens Cultural Center (Greek: Πνευματικό Κέντρο Δήμου Αθηναίων, romanized: Pneumatikó Kéntro Dī́mou Athīnaíōn) is the cultural center of the Municipality of Athens, in Greece. It is housed in an 1836 neoclassical building in the center of Athens. Originally the building housed the Municipal Hospital. It includes three exhibition rooms, the Fotis Kontoglou, Georgios Iakovidis and Nikolaos Gyzis halls, as well as the Antonis Tritsis amphitheatre, which holds various interdisciplinary seminars, conferences and other events.
