= Spyridon Vikatos =

Greek painter (1878-1960)

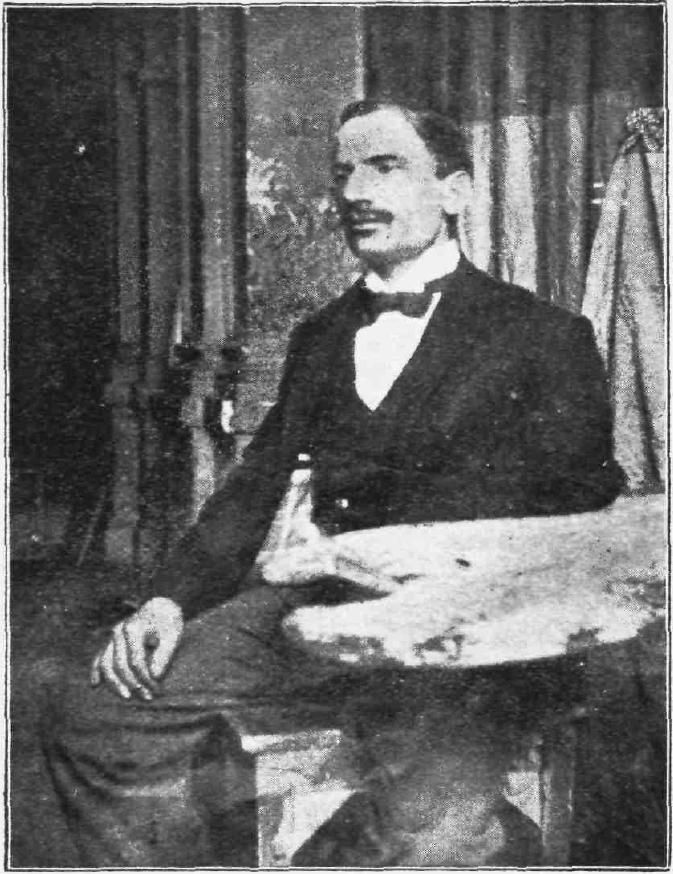
- Born: 24 September 1878; Argostoli, Cephalonia, Greece
- Died: 6 June 1960 (aged 81); Athens, Greece
- Other names: Greek: Σπυρίδων Βικάτος
- Occupation: Painter

Spyridon or Spyros Vikatos (Greek: Σπυρίδων Βικάτος; 24 September 1878 – 6 June 1960) was a Greek painter and professor. He is considered one of the later members of the Munich School.

== Life ==
Spyridon Vikatos was born in Argostoli, Cephalonia, in 1878. He was assisted by the Archbishop of Athens Germanos Kalligas to study painting at the Athens School of Fine Arts as a student of Nikiforos Lytras and Spyridon Prosalentis.

After his graduation Vikatos earned a scholarship and moved to Germany where he studied at the Academy of Fine Arts in Munich under Nikolaos Gyzis and Ludwig von Löfftz. He was also awarded with various prizes and distinctions. Following his return to Greece, Vikatos taught at the School of Fine Arts from 1909 until 1939. Agenor Asteriadis, Giorgos Gounaropoulos, Spyros Papaloukas, Yannis Tsarouchis, Sofia Zengo Papadhimitri, Yiannis Spyropoulos, Sophia Laskaridou and Victor Ioannides were among his students. He died in Athens in 1960.

== Work ==
Vikatos mainly painted portraits and genre subjects. His paintings show the influence of German academicism and also of the 17th century Flemish School. To a lesser extent he painted historical and religious compositions, still lifes and landscapes. He is noted for his depictions of old people, either alone or in larger compositions.

Vikatos participated in solo, group and international exhibitions, including the Bordeaux International Exposition in 1907 (gold medal), Rome in 1911, Paris in 1937 and the Venice Biennale in 1934 and 1936. in 1937 he received the national Medal of Arts and Letters, and in 1951 the Academy of Munich elected him an honorary member of the Fine Arts. Some of his artworks a held in the National Gallery of Greece, the Teloglion Foundation of Arts, the Municipal Art Gallery of Ioannina and the Municipal Art Gallery of Chania.

== Sources ==
- Βικάτος Σπύρος, National Gallery of Greece
- Δημοτική Πινακοθήκη (in Greek), Municipality of Ioannina
- Λασκαρίδου Σοφία (in Greek), National Gallery of Greece
- Spyropoulos Yannis, National Gallery of Greece
- The Cyprus Collection: Gambler, AG Leventis Gallery
- Theodore Kaloumenos, One hundred years of painting, Municipal Art Gallery of Chania
- "Vikatos Spyridon", Nikias

== Bibliography ==
- Μαρίνα Λαμπράκη-Πλάκα, ed. (1999). Εθνική Πινακοθήκη /100 χρόνια, Τέσσερις αιώνες Ελληνικής Ζωγραφικής, Από τις Συλλογές της Εθνικής Πινακοθήκης και του Ιδρύματος Ευριπίδη Κουτλίδη. Athens: Εθνική Πινακοθήκη και Μουσείο Αλεξάνδρου Σούτζου. pp. 651,656,668,677,683. ISBN 9607791029
