= Venia Bechrakis =

Greek photographer

- Greek: Βένια Μπεχράκη
- Born: Athens, Greece
- Education: Athens School of Fine Arts; New York University

Venia Bechrakis (Greek: Βένια Μπεχράκη) is a visual artist who lives and works in Athens and New York City.

== Biography ==
Born in Athens, Greece, Bechrakis studied painting at the Athens School of Fine Arts under professor Dimitris Mytaras. She won the Onassis Foundation Scholarship in 2000 and continued her studies at the New York University (MFA-Master in Fine Arts) in photography and video art with professors Peter Campus, Jack Risley and Sigrid Haackenberg. She received the Gerondelis Foundation Grant in 2001 and the Jack Goodman Award for Art & Technology, in 2002.

Bechrakis has presented her work in solo exhibitions in Greece and abroad: Strange Weathers, Melenia Art Gallery, Bucharest (2009), Urban Dwellings, Zina Athanassiadou Gallery, Thessaloniki (2008), Within-Without, Zoumboulakis Galleries, Athens (2006), Real Art Ways, Connecticut, granted by the National Endowment for the Arts (2003).

She has exhibited internationally in major international group shows, such as: "OpenXII" Lido Venice (2009), Face to Faces, 2nd Biennial of Thessaloniki, Museum of Photography Thessaloniki (2009), Art Athina 2009, Zina Athanasiadou Gallery & Gallery Basia Embiricos, Athens, "Art Photo Expo Miami", Zone D and Galerie Basia Embiricos, Miami Art Basel, Miami (2008), "Material Links", Museum of Contemporary Art (MOCA), Shanghai (2008), "The Water", Museum of Photography Thessaloniki (2008), "Heterotopias" (Public Screen, curated by Syrago Tsiara), 1st Biennial of Thessaloniki (2007), “The Chronicle of the Absurd“ (curated by Bia Papadopoulou), Thessaloniki Museum of Photography (2007), ‘Bodyconnections’, La Maison de la Photographie, Tashkent (2007), et al.

== Artistic practice ==
Bechrakis is a photographer, painter and video artist. Her work is based on performance art and investigates themes of gender, identity, private and public. Mostly known for her self-portrait photographs where the artist casts herself as protagonist in imaginary scripts and publicly performs private rituals and traditional female roles-often in exaggerated form. In her series "Within-Without" and "Strange Weathers" she stages paradox scenes into public spaces which reverse stereotypical imagery resulting from advertising, films and the visual art tradition putting into question female identity in a humorous manner.

At once the author of the image and the object of viewing, Bechrakis makes an ironic commentary of certain consumer and domestic patterns of behavior. She uses photography to construct imaginary, at times surrealist, environments that make reference to everyday life. Images that at first sight appear to be documenting a mundane reality, centering on the figure of a woman – the artist herself – challenge conventional restrictions and social taboos. Following in the footsteps of women performance artists of the 1980s, who consistently probed the boundaries between various manifestations of mass culture in art and lived experience, Bechrakis investigates throughout her work gender and identity issues, the relationship between the public and the private, real and fictitious space. Shifting between the art of performance, photography in its emancipated form, the composition of classical painting and a cinematic representation of reality, Bechrakis creates pictures that merge theatrical performances (tableaux-vivants) with a documentarian view, exploring the fine line between autobiography and fiction.

== See also ==
- Visual Arts
- Performance Art
