= Janicat =

Janicat Γιαννιτσάτι
- Village
- Location within Albania
- Coordinates: 39°50′11″N 20°13′32″E
- Country: Albania
- County: Vlorë
- Municipality: Finiq
- Administrative unit: Dhivër
- Time zone: UTC+1 (CET)
  - Summer (DST): UTC+2 (CEST)

Janicat (Albanian definite form: Janicati; Greek: Γιαννιτσάτι or Γιαννιτσάτες) is a settlement in the Vlorë County, southwestern Albania. At the 2015 local government reform it became part of the municipality Finiq.

== Demographics ==
The village is inhabited by Greeks and the population was 97 in 1992.

== Notable people ==
- Katina Papa
