= Michael Tombros =

Greek sculptor (1889–1974)

- Μιχάλης Τόμπρος
- Born: 12 November 1889; Athens, Greece
- Died: 28 May 1974 (aged 84); Athens, Greece
- Occupation: Sculptor

Michael Tombros (or Michalis Tombros, Greek: Μιχάλης Τόμπρος, 12 November 1889 – 28 May 1974) was a Greek sculptor who was influential in introducing avant-garde styles into Greece.

== Life ==
Michael Tombros was born in Athens in 1889, son of a marble sculptor from Korthio, Andros island. He attended the Athens School of Fine Arts from 1903 to 1909. He studied sculpture with Georgios Vroutos and Lazaros Sochos, and drawing with Dimitrios Geraniotis, Alexandros Kalloudis and Georgios Jakobides. He also worked at the marble sculpture workshop of N.M. Perakis. In 1910 he set up his own studio in Athens. In 1914 he obtained a scholarship from the estate of George Averoff which let him study at the Académie Julian in Paris under Henri Bouchard and Paul Landowski.

Michael Tombros returned to Athens in 1919 and was appointed temporary professor of Sculpture in Architecture at the National Technical University of Athens (NTUA), while continuing to travel and to undertake commissions. He resigned from the NTUA in 1923 due to its opposition to establishment of a war museum. In 1925 he returned to Paris, where he stayed until 1928 with a workshop in Montparnasse. There he met artists such as Georges Braque and Pablo Picasso. During this period he was active in exhibitions and experimented with avant-garde techniques after encountering them for the first time.

After returning to Greece, between 1933 and 1934 Tombros published 20ός Αιώνας (20th Century), an influential magazine on the visual arts. The magazine was large, well printed in black and white, with a colored cover. It was the first purely pictorial magazine in Greece, covering a range of international subjects and including criticism and commentary by artists and intellectuals such as Le Corbusier, Fernand Léger, Christian Zervos, Nikos Hadjikyriakos-Ghikas and Zacharias Papantoniou. Tombros was a full professor of sculpture at the Athens School of Fine Arts from 1938 to 1960, and a director of the school from 1957 to 1959. In 1943 he was appointed Director of Fine Arts at the Ministry of Education. He was elected a member of the Academy of Athens in 1968. Michael Tombros died on 28 May 1974.

== Work ==
Sculptures by Michael Tombros were exhibited in major solo and group exhibitions including the Salon des Artistes Francais, Salon des Tuileries and Salon des Indépendants in Paris, the 1937 Exposition Internationale des Arts et Techniques dans la Vie Moderne in Paris, the Venice Biennale (1934, 1938 and 1956), and the São Paulo Art Biennial (1955). He played an important role in encouraging development of avant-garde art in Greece, and experimented with abstraction, cubism and surrealism. However, he was not always successful in his experiments, and often followed a more conventional academic style with commissioned works. The Municipal Art Gallery of Ioannina holds examples of his sculpture.

== Sources ==
- Δημοτική Πινακοθήκη (in Greek), Municipality of Ioannina, archived from the original on 2015-09-18
- Δανάης Α. Μπασαντή (16 March 2015), "Μιχάλης Τόμπρος – Ένας ανδριώτης στην πρωτοπορία της ελληνικής γλυπτικής του 20ου αιώνα", En Andro (in Greek)
- "Τόμπρος Μιχάλης", Fine Arts Gallery (in Greek)
- Τόμπρος Μιχάλης (in Greek), National Gallery of Greece
