= Sofia Petropoulou =

Greek painter (born 1964)

- (Greek: Σοφία Πετροπούλου)
- Born: 1964 (age 61–62)
- Education: University of Exeter

Sofia Petropoulou (Greek: Σοφία Πετροπούλου; born 1964) is a Greek painter based in Athens. She has been acknowledged for the merging of realism and abstraction in her paintings.

== Biography ==
She was born in Greece in 1964. After finishing school she studied in the University of Exeter in England where she obtained a master's degree in sociology of education. Later she moved to Luxembourg, where she lived for nine years before returning to Greece. Petropoulou has shown her work in 12 individual and 15 group exhibitions in Greece, Luxembourg, Belgium, Cyprus and the United Kingdom. Her artworks have been sold in auction in auction houses including Christie's and Piasa in London and France respectively and they belong to private and public collections such as the collection of the King George Hotel in Athens.

She is a member of Chamber of Fine Arts of Greece.

== Art ==
Petropoulou draws from both the natural elements and the urban landscapes, and her paintings remain close to real sources, but on the same time she permits color and gesture to dictate composition. With motion and lyricism, abstraction yet representation, Sofia Petropoulou through her paintings narrates, and it has been said by art critics (like Vasile Randu of Luxemburger Wort) that she has personified landscapes, cities and even the Mediterranean sea with her brushstrokes.

== Exhibitions (selected) ==
=== Individual Exhibitions ===
- European Commission, Luxembourg (1999)
- European Commission, Luxembourg (2001)
- Masion de la Grece, Paris (2003)
- Espace ‘Orfeu’, Brussels (2003)
- ‘En Plo’ Gallery, Paphos (2004)
- ‘Theorema’ Gallery, Brussels (2005)
- Hellenic Centre of London (2005)
- ‘Metopi’ Gallery, Athens (2006)
- Tsichrintzis Foundation of the Visual Arts, Athens (2010)

=== Group exhibitions ===
- ‘Konschthaus Beim Engel’ Gallery, Ministry of Culture of Luxembourg (2003)
- European Commission, Luxembourg (2004)
- ‘Theorema’ Gallery, Brussels (2004)
- Cercel Municipale, Luxembourg (2004)
- ‘Art Studio 55’ gallery, Limasol, Cyprus (2007)
- Villa Koundouros, Chania (2007)
- ‘Art Space’ Gallery, Exo Gonia, Santorini (2008)
- Goulandris Museum, Athens (2008)
- Frieze Art Fair, London (2008)
- Athens War Museum (2009)
- Technopolis, Athens (2009)
