= Aikaterini Laskaridou =

Greek feminist and educator

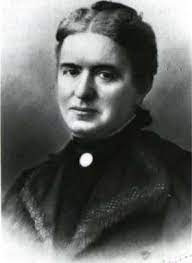
- Aikaterini Laskaridou
- Born: 1842; Vienna
- Died: 1916 (aged 73–74)
- Other names: Ekatherina Laskaridou; Aikaterini Christomanou-Laskaridou

Aikaterini Laskaridou (1842–1916) was a Greek feminist and educator who created the kindergarten system in Greece and introduced physical exercise into the girls' schools.

== Biography ==
Laskaridou was born Aikaterini Christomanou in Vienna to Meleniki Konstantinos A. Christomanos and Maria Kazassi in 1842. She attended the Vienna Academy for teacher training studying from 1842 to 1855. She married Laskaris Laskaridis, a wealthy merchant from Bursa in 1858, and they mostly lived in Athens. There, in 1864 she founded the Greek Girls' School. She trained and worked as a teacher in the Athen's Hill's School going on to become the school's director working there from 1865 to 1867). Then in 1867 she created the Hellenic Girls' School with Kalliopi Kehajia where she remained until 1887. She studied in Germany under Baroness Bertha von Marenholtz-Bülowin 1878 and 1879. There she learned the Froebelian method which she brought back with her to Greece and introduced into preschool education and preschool teachers’ education. She promoted this method until she retired in 1887. From then on she worked to turn the "Ellinikon Parthenagogeion" into a center of Froebel's method. She followed up her school with the Urban Girls' School of Aspasia Skordeli. Laskaridou was president of the Education Department of the Union of Greek Women. She worked with the Gymnastics Association to operate the first Gymnastics in Schools. Within this role she worked to create the Teaching of Kindergarten Teachers and the Gymnastics School for Girls.

In the midst of the Greco-Turkish War (1897) Laskaridou organised training workshops for the poor in Municipal theatres in Athens and Piraeus. She later opened both Kindergartens and gymnasia for the poor in both locations. Night schools to train up enough teachers began in 1906. Finally Laskaridou founded the National Kindergarten to train children's teachers and the Higher Girls' School of Athens in 1912.

Laskaridou had three daughters: Melpomene, Sophia Laskaridou, born in 1876 went on to become a notable artist and Eirini Laskaridou was born in 1882. Eirini founded the House of the Blind in Kallithea and introduced the Braille reading method for the blind in Greece. Laskaridou was awarded the Silver Cross for her work. She died in Athens in a car accident in 1916.
