= Dimitrios Geraniotis =

Greek portrait painter and professor (1871–1966)

- Δημήτριος Γερανιώτης
- Born: 1871; Athens, Greece
- Died: 23 May 1966 (aged 94–95); Athens, Greece
- Occupations: Painter, professor

Dimitrios Geraniotis (Greek: Δημήτριος Γερανιώτης, 1871 – 23 May 1966) was a Greek portrait painter and professor at the Athens School of Fine Arts.

== Life ==
Dimitrios Geraniotis was born in Athens in 1871. He studied painting at the Athens School of Fine Arts under Spyridon Prosalentis, Konstantinos Volanakis and Nikiforos Lytras. He went on to the Academy of Fine Arts, Munich from 1895 to 1899 where he studied with Nikolaos Gyzis and Franz Stuck, and in the studio of Georgios Jakobides. After returning to Greece he taught portraiture at the Ladies Art School. He began to teach at the School of Fine Arts from 1903, at first teaching statuette drawing and from 1904 teaching silhouettes in place of Konstantinos Volanakis, who had resigned. He taught until 1936.

Dimitrios Geraniotis died in Athens in 1966.

== Work ==
Geraniotis was an academic painter, who mainly made portraits. His work is generally conventional and follows the principles of the Munich School. He participated in the 1900 Exposition Universelle in Paris, and in many group exhibitions in Greece. He represented Greece at the Venice Biennale in 1934.

== Sources ==
- "Γερανιώτης Δημήτριος", ASFA (in Greek), archived from the original on 2014-06-21
- "Γερανιώτης Δημήτριος", National Gallery of Greece (in Greek), archived from the original on 2016-03-02
