= Sophia Laskaridou =

Greek painter (1876–1965)

- Σοφία Λασκαρίδου
- Portrait of Sophia Laskaridou by Spyros Vikatos
- Born: 1882; Athens, Greece
- Died: 13 November 1965 (aged 82–83); Kallithea, Attica, Greece
- Occupation: Artist

Sophia Laskaridou (Greek: Σοφία Λασκαρίδου, 1876 – 13 November 1965) was a Greek artist who was well known for her impressionist paintings in the early part of the 20th century. Later she became better known for her life than for her work.

== Life ==
Sophia Laskaridou was born in Athens in 1876. She came from an affluent and cosmopolitan family. Her father, Laskaris Laskaridis, was raised in London. Her mother, Aikaterini Christomanou-Laskaridou, was born and raised in Vienna and was a pioneer of women's education who founded a girls' school in Athens in 1864 and was the first to introduce physical education for girls.

Sophia Laskaridou began painting before receiving any artistic education. At first she focused on landscapes, in part because she did not have the knowledge needed to depict figures. Her decision to paint en plein air was unusual in Greece at the time, particularly for a woman, since there was constant danger from thieves in the countryside. In the period from 1897 to 1907 she participated in important art exhibitions including Zappeion and the International Exhibition of 1903. She studied at the Athens School of Fine Arts from 1903 to 1907 with teachers Konstantinos Volanakis, Georgios Roilos, Nikiforos Lytras and Georgios Jakobides. She also studied with Spyridon Vikatos. In 1906 she and Thalia Flora staged a joint exhibition, and in 1907 she held a solo exhibition in "Parnassus".

In 1908 Laskaridou left for Munich, and from 1908 to 1916 she stayed in Germany and France, where her work received a positive reception. She had obtained a scholarship from the Bozeiou Endowment that allowed her to study in Munich where she received free lessons at the School of the Ladies Association of Artists. In Paris she studied to the Académie de la Grande Chaumière and Académie Colarossi. Her work was shown at the Salon.

Laskaridou returned to settle permanently in Greece in 1916. By this time she was considered a prominent artist. She exhibited in 1924 and 1927 and sold many paintings. After this her work only appeared in occasional group exhibitions. Myths gradually developed about her time in Europe, such as that she had affairs with Pablo Picasso and Auguste Renoir, and these later became accepted as fact. In 1952 she staged a solo retrospective exhibition. She died in Athens in 1965.

== Work ==
Laskaridou's subjects include genre scenes, portraits, still lifes and landscapes. Her style shows the influence of impressionism. Her goal was to capture light and color in her paintings, with drawing and composition secondary concerns.

== Publications ==
In 1955 Laskaridou published her autobiography, From my diary. Memories and contemplations, covering her time in Germany and France. In 1960 she published From my diary. Annex: A big love, in which she described her love affairs with the poet and essayist Pericles Giannopoulos.

== Sources ==
- Christina Grammatikopoulou (2007), "From Artist to Myth: The reception of Sophia Laskaridou", Interartive, ISSN 2013-679X
- The Painter Sophia Laskaridou, 1876-1965 (in Greek), Aristotle University of Thessaloniki
- Tamboukou, Maria (2010-04-16), In the Fold between Power and Desire: Women Artists' Narratives, Cambridge Scholars Publishing, ISBN 978-1-4438-2186-5
- Grammatikopoulou, Christina (2007), The Painter Sophia Laskaridou, 1876-1965, Aristotle University, p. 4
- Λασκαρίδου Σοφία (in Greek), National Gallery of Greece
