= Dimitris Mytaras =

Greek artist

Dimitris Mytaras (Greek: Δημήτρης Μυταράς; 18 June 1934 – 16 February 2017) was a Greek artist who is considered one of the important painters of Greece during the 20th century.

His work was mainly inspired by the human figure, and a combination of naturalism and expressionism. From the 1960s onward, Mytaras moved in the direction of naturalism, while from 1975 an expressionistic approach became more and more marked in his output.

== Biography ==
Dimitris Mytaras was born in 1934 in Chalcis. From 1953 till 1957, Mytaras studied at the Athens School of Fine Arts under Yiannis Moralis and Spyros Papaloukas. Leaving Greece in 1961 he studied stage design at the Ecole Nationale Superieure des Arts Decoratifs in Paris with Labicse and Jean-Louis Barrault on a three-year scholarship. Later in 1966, he returned to Athens, where in those 5 years from 1961 to 1966 he participated in the São Paulo Art Biennial and the Alexandria Biennial. Upon his return to Athens he held the retrospective "Study on a Mirror" at the Merlin Gallery, at a point when he was under heavy influence from abstraction, he went on to state that "In the end my deepest concern is with the idea of changing form" (in regards to his show). From 1964 till 1972, he directed the Interior Decoration Workshop of the Athens Technological Institute. Beginning in 1975, he taught at the Painting Workshop of the Athens School of Fine Arts. Mytaras participated in more than 30 international group shows, including the 1972 Venice Biennale. He was also a renowned scenic designer and worked for major Greek theaters, National Theatre of Greece and National Theatre of Northern Greece included.

Mytaras died on 16 February 2017 in Athens following major health complications.

== Works ==
During the time of the Greek military junta of 1967-1974, Mytaras sought to comment critically on Greek life through a series of realistic works entitled Photographic Documents.

Later in life he turned towards classical themes.

Mytaras was selected to create one of the official posters for the 2004 Summer Olympics in Athens.

== See also ==
- Art in modern Greece
