= Athens School of Fine Arts =

Arts school in Athens, Greece

Coordinates: 37.962°N 23.689°E

- Ανωτάτη Σχολή Καλών Τεχνών
- Type: Public higher education institution
- Established: January 12, 1837; 189 years ago 1930; 96 years ago (in its present form)
- Location: Agios Ioannis Rentis, Athens, Greece
- Campus: Urban
- Website: www.asfa.gr/en/

The Athens School of Fine Arts (ASFA; Greek: Ανωτάτη Σχολή Καλών Τεχνών, romanized: Anōtátī Scholī́ Kalṓn Technṓn, ΑΣΚΤ) is a Greek higher education institution, specializing in the visual arts.

== History ==
The Athens School of Fine Arts was established on 12 January 1837, known as the School for the Arts. In the beginning the school of arts included three departments: the Crafts School (part-time school), Industrial Crafts School (full-time school) and Fine Arts School (full-time higher education).

The third department was the real ancestor of today's School of Fine Arts and began to function as a daily school in 1840. In this department subjects like painting, sculpture, architecture, lithography, woodcut, geometry and cartography were taught. The same year Duchess of Plaisance who lived in Greece contributed in upgrading the school. She enriched the school's program with new types of painting lessons and called the French painter Bonirote (one of Jean Auguste Dominique Ingres's students) in order to teach oil painting courses. Bonirote was a teacher there until 1843.

In 1843 with royal decree School of Fine Arts was promoted in a five-year study higher education school. Director of the school was the famous architect Lissandros Kautantzoglou. During the period 1844–1862 the studies program was influenced by Europe's Academies of Fine Arts which taught neoclassicism. Some of the great students of this period finally became teachers in the school. Some of them are Nikiphoros Lytras and Nicholaos Gysis. In 1872, after a donation of George Averoff, a new building in Patission Avenue road was constructed that was later named National Technical University of Athens.

In 1910 the faculty acquired the independence from the named National Technical University. The same year the first four women were accepted to the School of Fine Arts.

In 1923, the new Director, Nikolaos Lytras (Nikiphoros' son), reorganized the workshops to give them more independence and promoted newer styles of painting.

In 1930, Education Minister Georgios Papandreou completely revamped and upgraded the old school, and gave it its current name (Ανώτατη Σχολή Καλών Τεχνών).

In 1929 Konstantinos Parthenis started teaching in the school. His lessons were mostly about the analysis of visual perception and the plastic transformation of the incoming visual information. Many other famous artists were occupied in Athens School of Fine Arts: the sculptor Costas Dimitriadis, the engraver Yannis Kefallinos, the writer and historian Pantelis Prebelakis. Since 1947 Yiannis Moralis, Georgios Mauroidis, Constantinos Grammatopoulos and Spyros Papaloukas, Panayiotis Tetsis, Nikos Kessanlis, Dimitris Mytaras, Georgios Nikolaidis, Ilias Dekoylakos and the architect Savvas Kontaratos taught the principles of Modern Greek art.

== Departments ==
Departments
Department of Visual Arts (founded 1930)
Department of Art Theory and History (founded 2006)

== HQAA evaluation ==
An external evaluation of all academic departments in Greek universities will be conducted by the Hellenic Quality Assurance and Accreditation Agency (HQAA) in the following years.

== Notable alumni ==
- Philolaos (sculptor) (1923-2010), sculptor
- Vangelis (1943–2022), composer and painter
- Athanase Apartis (1899–1972), sculptor
- Venia Bechrakis (1974–), artist
- Georgios Bonanos (1863–1940), sculptor
- Yannoulis Chalepas (1851–1938), sculptor
- Giorgos Charvalias (1956–), painter
- Tasos Dimos (1960–), painter
- Vasileios Hatzis (1870–1915), painter
- Giorgio de Chirico (1888–1978), painter
- Demetrios Farmakopoulos (1919–1996), painter
- Alekos Fassianos (1935–2022), painter
- Dimitrios Geraniotis (1871–1966), painter
- Giorgios Gounaropoulos (1890–1977), painter
- Nikolaos Gyzis (1842–1901), painter
- Georgios Jakobides (1853–1932), painter
- Vaso Katraki (1914–1988), engraver
- Aggelika Korovessi (1952–), sculptor
- Ioannis Kossos (1822–1875), sculptor
- Lazaros Pandos (1958–), painter, photographer
- Sophia Laskaridou (1882–1965), painter
- Thanos Leivaditis (1934–2005), actor, screenwriter
- Nikiforos Lytras (1832–1904), painter
- Michael Nikolinakos (1923–1994), actor, painter
- Yiannis Maltezos (1913–1987), painter
- Yiannis Moralis (1916–2009), painter
- Dimitris Mytaras (1934–2017), painter
- Aglaia Papa (1904–1984), painter
- Dimitris Papaioannou (1964–), choreographer, visual artist
- Theodoros Papagiannis (1942–), sculptor
- Heleni Polichronatou (1959–), painter, sculptor, art historian
- Georgios Prokopiou (1876–1940), painter
- Georgios Roilos (1867–1928), painter
- Gabriella Simossi (1926 – 1999), sculptor
- Michael Tombros (1889–1974), sculptor
- Yannis Tsarouchis (1910–1989), painter
- Spyridon Vikatos (1878–1960), painter
- Spyros Vassiliou (1903–1985), painter
- Androniqi Zengo Antoniu (1913–2000), painter
- Sofia Zengo Papadhimitri (1915–1976), painter
- Nella Golanda (1941–2023), sculptor, landscape designer

== See also ==
- List of universities in Greece
- List of research institutes in Greece
- National Technical University of Athens, the oldest Polytechnic University in Athens, which can trace its roots to the formation of the Industrial Crafts School in 1837.
- Education in Greece
- Academic grading in Greece
