= Modern Greek art =

Period of Greek art

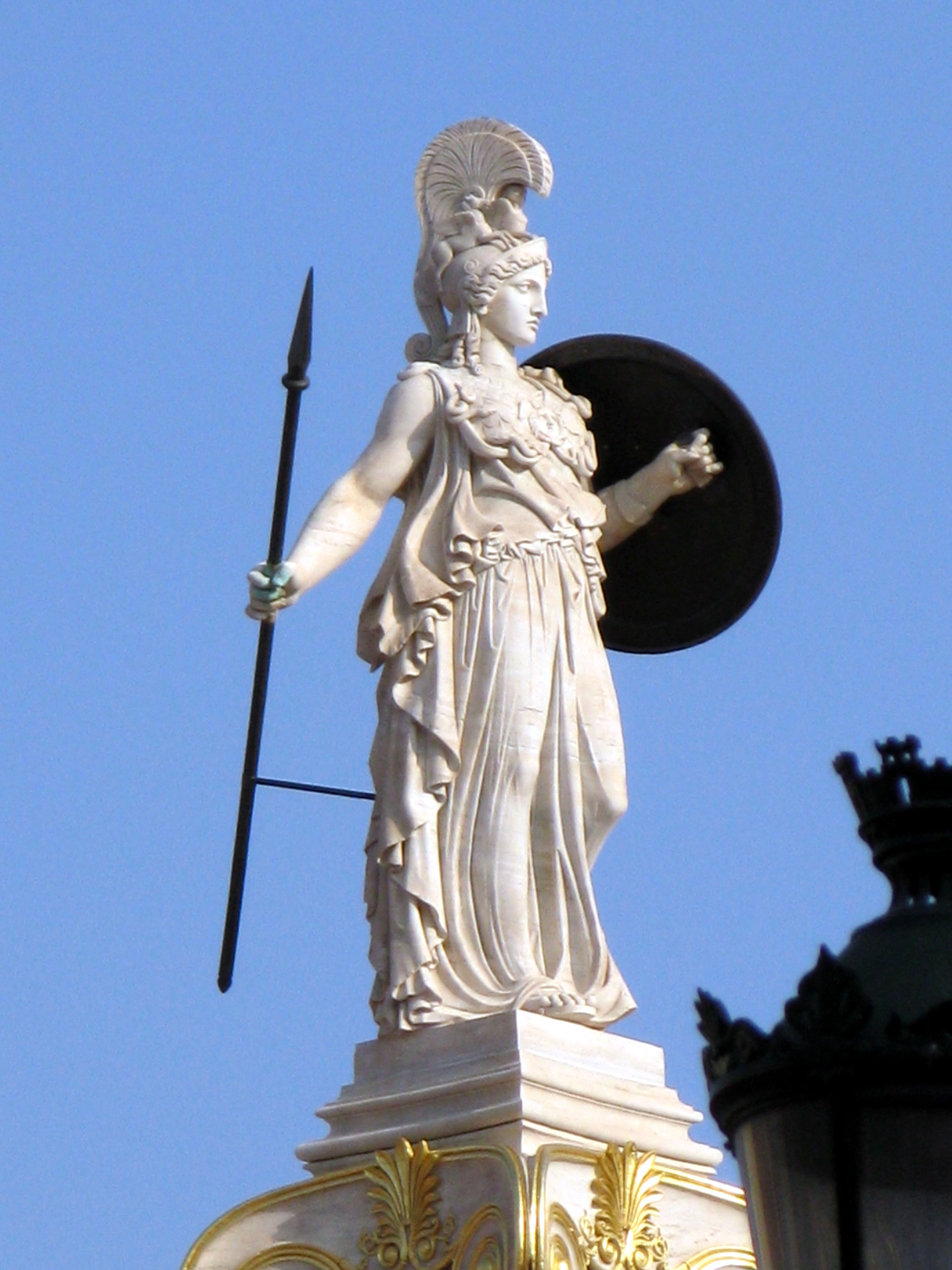
Athena column by Leonidas Drosis in front of the Academy of Athens (modern).

Modern Greek art is art from the period between the emergence of the new independent Greek state and the 20th century. As Mainland Greece was under Ottoman rule for all four centuries, it was not a part of the Renaissance and artistic movements that followed in Western Europe. However, Greek islands such as Crete, and the Ionian islands in particular were for large periods under Venetian or other European powers' rule and thus were able to better assimilate the radical artistic changes that were occurring in Europe during the 14th-18th century.

The Cretan School and in particular the Heptanese School of art are two important artistic movements in Greece that followed parallel routes to Western Europe.

Modern Greek art can be said to have been predominantly shaped by the particular socioeconomic conditions of Greece, the large Greek diaspora across Europe, and the new Greek social elite, as well as external artistic influences, predominantly from Germany and France.

== Sculpture and painting ==
=== 19th century ===
The School of Munich

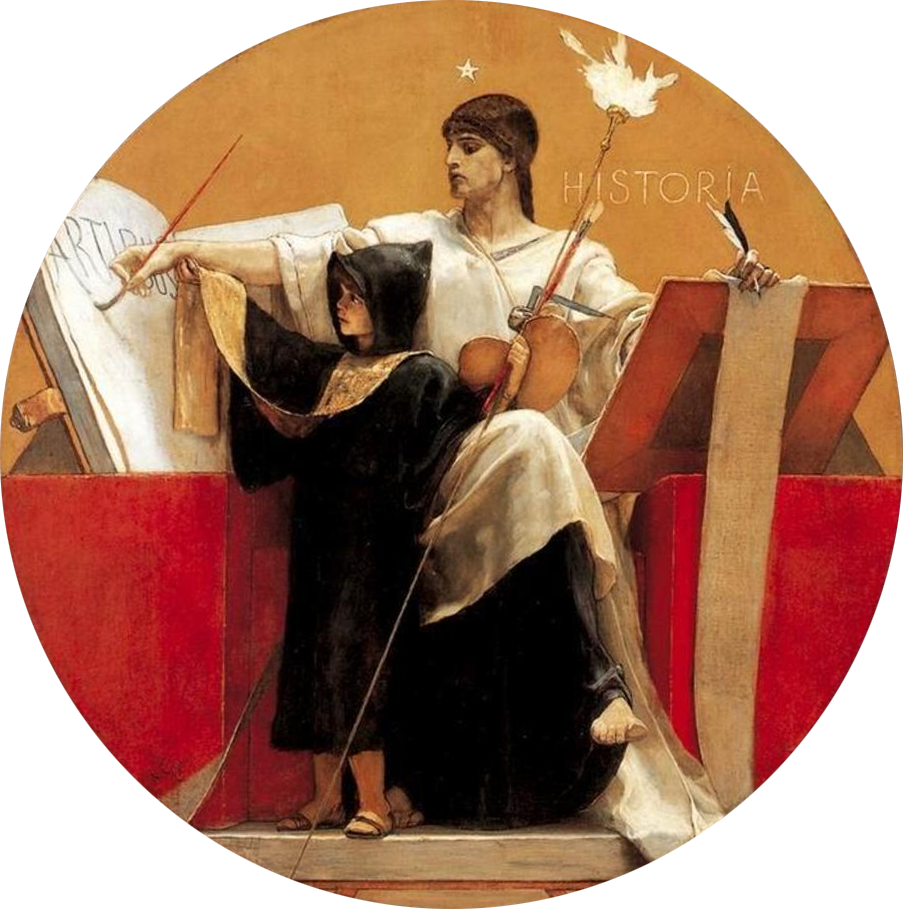
Ηistoria (Allegory of History) by Nikolaos Gyzis (1892).

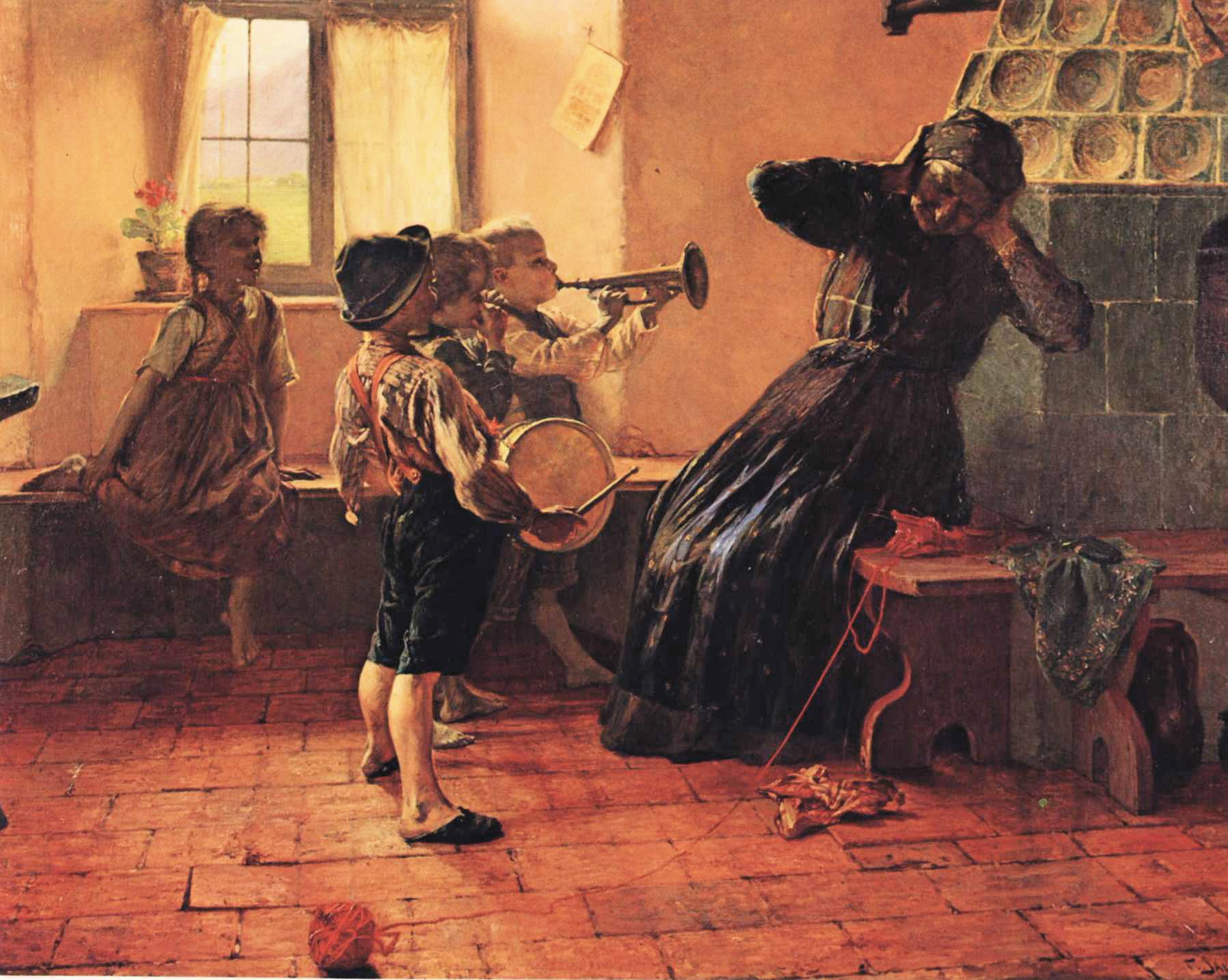
Georgios Jakobides, Children's Concert.

Modern Greek art began to be developed around the time of Romanticism. Greek artists absorbed many elements from their European colleagues, resulting in the culmination of the distinctive style of Greek Romantic art, inspired by revolutionary ideals as well as the country's geography and history. After centuries of Ottoman rule, few opportunities for an education in the arts existed in the newly independent Greece, so studying abroad was imperative for artists. Munich, as an important international center for the arts at that time, was the place where the majority of the Greek artists of the 19th century chose to study. In the school of Munich, led by Karl von Piloty, true fresco was taught for mural paintings on fresh wet lime plaster. During this period much of the art was emotional and theatrical in tone. The most prominent themes of the school of Munich were urban life, rural life, still life, and landscape.

Later on, they would return to Greece and pass on their knowledge. Some of them remained in Munich, the so-called Athens on the Isar. Both academic and personal bonds developed between early Greek painters and Munich artistry giving birth to the Greek "Munich School" of painting. Nikolaos Gysis was an important teacher and artist at the Munich Academy and he soon became a leading figure among Greek artists. Academism, realism, genre painting, upper middle class portraiture, still life and landscape painting, often representing impressionist features, will be replaced in the end of the 19th century by Symbolism, Jugendstil, Art Nouveau, which are mainly traced in the work of Nikolaos Gysis, Aristeas and others. Early-20th-century modernism is also represented by significant Greek artists in Munich. Many of these Munich School artists chose subjects such as everyday Greek life, local customs, and living conditions. Several important painters emerged at this time. Theodoros Vryzakis specialized in historical painting and especially inspired by the 1821 Greek War of Independence. Nikiphoros Lytras concentrated on realistic depictions of Greek life. Georgios Jakobides devoted his attention to infants and children and he would later become the first Director of the new National Gallery of Athens. Georgios Roilos was another leading painter of the period closely associated with the Munich School, especially in his early career. Konstantinos Volanakis was inspired mostly by the Greek sea.

Other artists associated with the School of Munich were Symeon Sabbides, Yannoulis Chalepas, Leonidas Drosis, as well as quite a few modernist artists who studied at the Academy of Fine Arts, Munich, which included Theofrastos Triantafyllidis, Jorgos Busianis, and also Giorgio de Chirico.

Notable sculptors of the new Greek Kingdom were Leonidas Drosis (his major work was the extensive neo-classical architectural ornament at the Academy of Athens), Lazaros Sochos, Georgios Vitalis, Georgios Fytalis, Lazaros Fytalis, Dimitrios Filippotis, Ioannis Kossos, Yannoulis Chalepas, and Georgios Bonanos.

The School of Paris

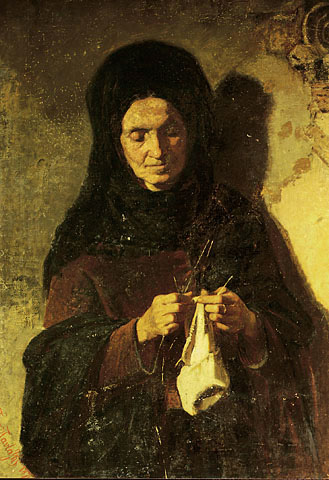
Lady knitting by Périclès Pantazis.

A few Greek painters studied in Paris. Despite residing in the French capital and following the guidelines of the French Art Academy, they invariably had their own interpretations. Jacob Rizos was involved with the rendering of female grace, Theodoros Rallis with scenes from the Orthodox East and Nikolaos Xydias Typaldos with portraiture, still life and genre painting. During this period in Paris the avant-garde Impressionist movement developed, but most Greek painters remained faithful to the precepts of their teachers with only some nebulous thrusts in the direction of this movement. The first Greek impressionist was Périclès Pantazis who, after Paris, settled in Belgium and became a part of the avant-garde group Circle de la pâte.

Themes-artistic depictions

Many Greek artists of this period also drew upon El Greco's style for inspiration, particularly when creating art based on religious themes. This tied in with the idea of modern secular Greek art of the period referencing more classical styles, while religious art referenced Byzantine, or Byzantine inspired art. Moreover, an important and often pioneering role was played by artists from Ionian islands in the 18th century and the beginning of the 19th century, who exploited conquests of the Italian Renaissance and baroque ateliers. As efforts persisted with new directions and objectives, Greek artists emerging in the world during the first decades of the 19th century reconnected Greek art with its ancient tradition, as well as with the quests of the European ateliers, especially those of the Munich School, with defining examples of the Greek contemporary art of the period including the works of Theodoros Vryzakis and Nikiphoros Lytras.

=== 20th century ===
At the beginning of the 20th century landscape painting held sway and the interest of painters turned toward the study of light and color. The dependence of Munich slackened and Paris became the pole of attraction for the artists of the period. In the early 20th century Demetrios Galanis, a contemporary and friend of Picasso, achieved wide recognition in France and lifelong membership of the Académie française following his acclaim by the critic Andre Malreaux as an artist capable "of stirring emotions as powerful as those of Giotto". Later in the century Nikos Engonopoulos achieved international recognition with his surrealist conceptions both of painting and poetry, while in the late 1960s Dimitris Mytaras and Yiannis Psychopedis became associated with European critical realism. Impressionism was the original influence on the leading figures of the art of the first half of the 20th century, Konstantinos Parthenis and Konstantinos Maleas, while Nikiphoros Lytras associated himself with the avant-garde groups of Munich constituting the last known link with the series of painters in the great tradition of Munich in Greek art . The further development of these painters led to other roads, but always within the framework of the avant-garde movement albeit with a Greek dimension.

Gradually the impressionists and other modern schools increased their influence. In the early 20th century Greek artists turned from Munich to Paris. The interest of Greek painters, artists changes from historical representations to Greek landscapes with an emphasis on light and colours so abundant in Greece. Representatives of this artistic change are Konstantinos Parthenis, Konstantinos Maleas, Nikiphoros Lytras and Georgios Bouzianis. Konstantinos Parthenis, in particular, introduces historical, religious and mythological elements that allow the classification of Greek painting into modern art. The same is true with the landscapes of Konstantinos Maleas and the expressionism of Georgios Bouzianis. The period of the 1930s was a landmark for the Greek painters, with Yiannis Tsarouchis, Yiannis Moralis, Nikos Hadjikyriakos-Ghikas, Spyros Vassiliou, Alekos Kontopoulos (introduced abstraction in Greek paintings) and Spyros Papaloukas coming into the limelight of Greek Art. These painters tried mainly to link leading European trends with Greek tradition.

== Notable 20th- and 21st-century artists ==
The second half of the 20th century has seen a range of acclaimed Greek artists, such as Constantine Andreou, recipient of the French Légion d'honneur, and Thodoros Papadimitriou, an internationally acclaimed sculptor. Giorgio de Chirico was an influential pre-Surrealist Greek-Italian painter who founded Metaphysical art. Jannis Kounellis ranks among the pioneers of the Arte Povera artistic movement. Electros Vekris, Kinetic artist and Sculptor, is the most well-known artist to be working in the field of light, Sound and Motion. Theodoros Stamos was a renowned abstract exessionist painter. Takis, Chryssa and Constantin Xenakis are internationally acclaimed artists of Kinetic sculpture. Other notable Greek artists are Hermon di Giovanno, Varotsos, Dimitris Mytaras, Spyros Vassiliou, Alekos Fassianos, Theocharis Mores, Dimitris Koukos (1948-), Nikos Stratakis, Steven Antonakos, Kostas Tsoklis, Konstantinos Karahalios, Nikos Hadjikyriakos-Ghikas, Thanassis Stephopoulos, Tasos Dimos, Aggelika Korovessi, and Yiannis Melanitis.

== Gallery ==
Konstantinos Volanakis, Anchored boats.

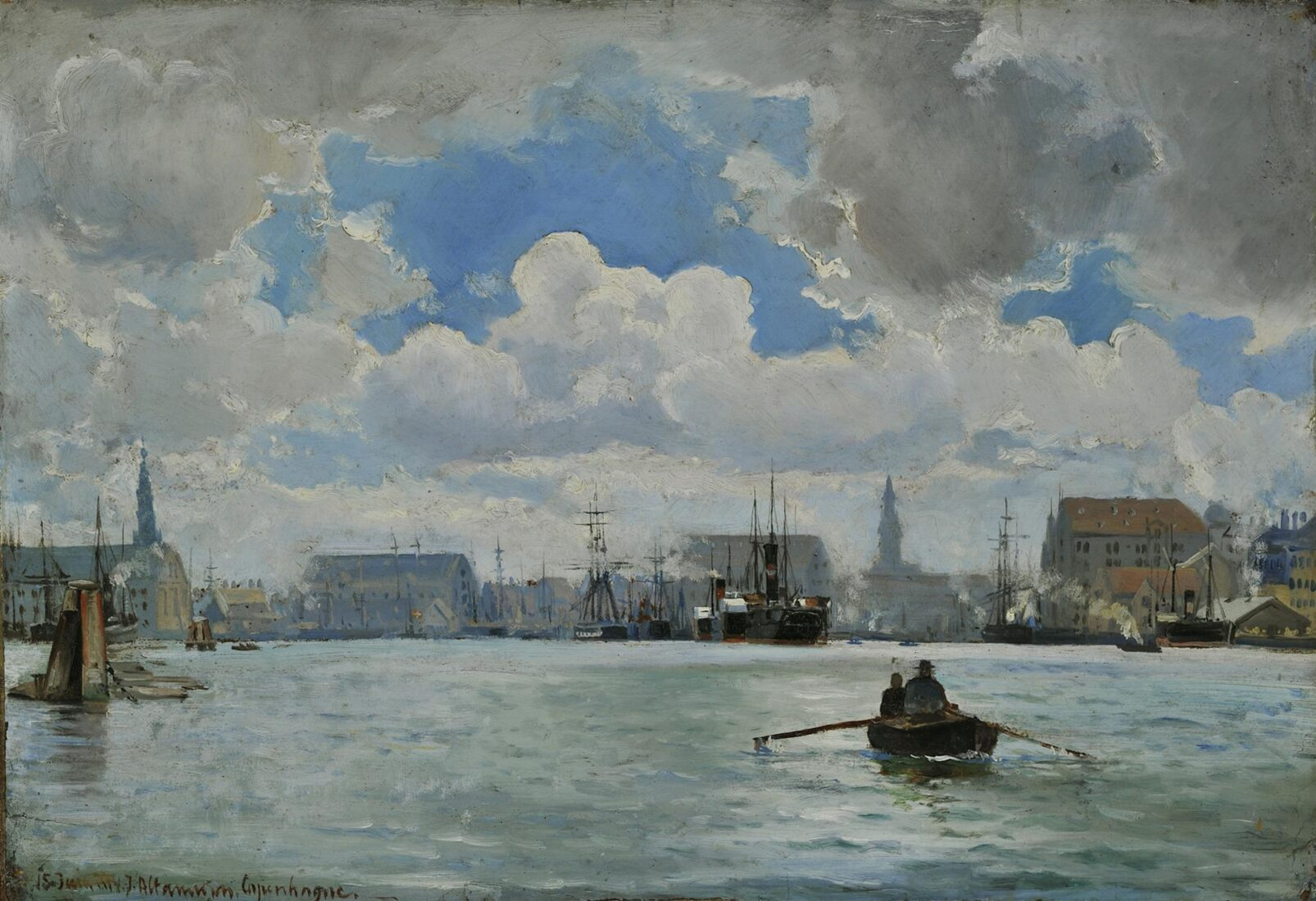
Ioannis Altamouras, The port of Copenhagen.

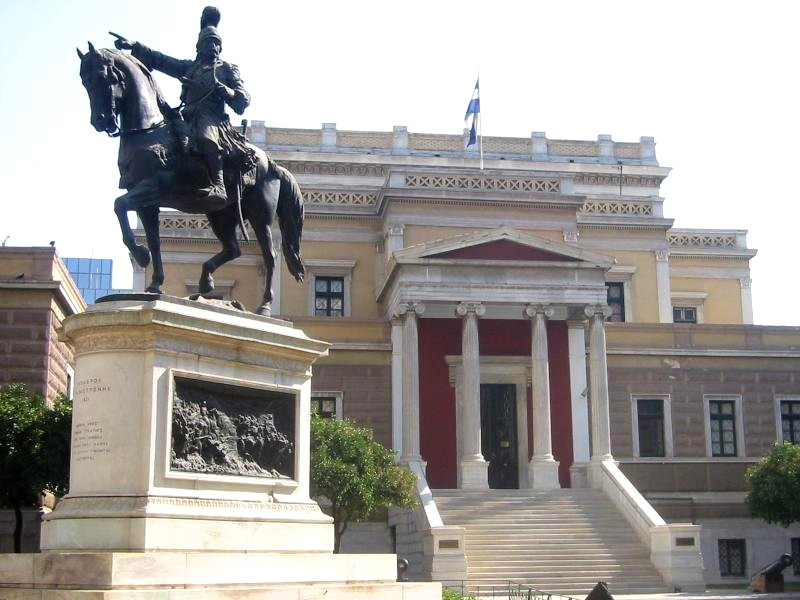
Kolokotronis' statue by Lazaros Sochos.

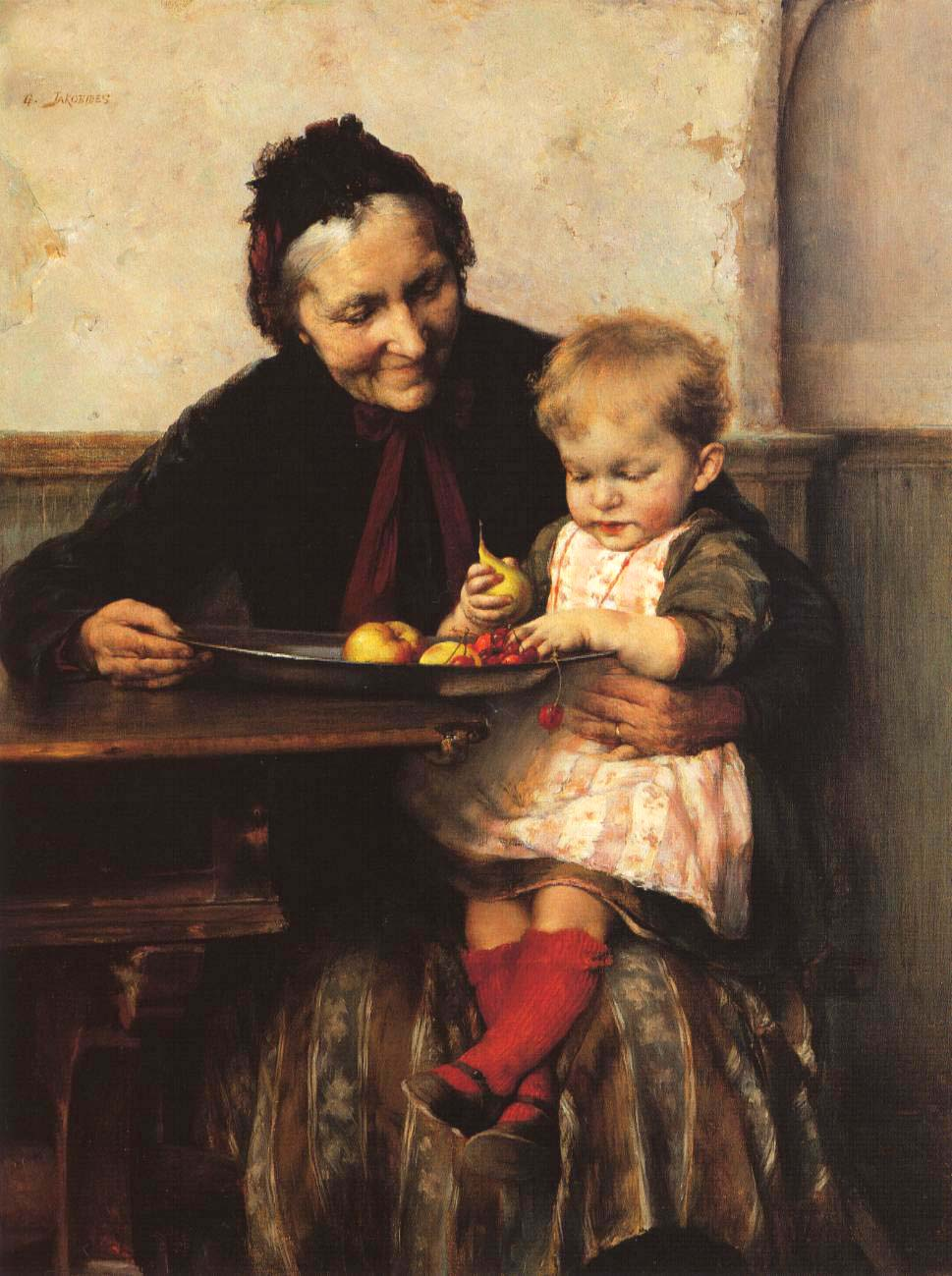
Grandma's Favorite by Georgios Jakobides.

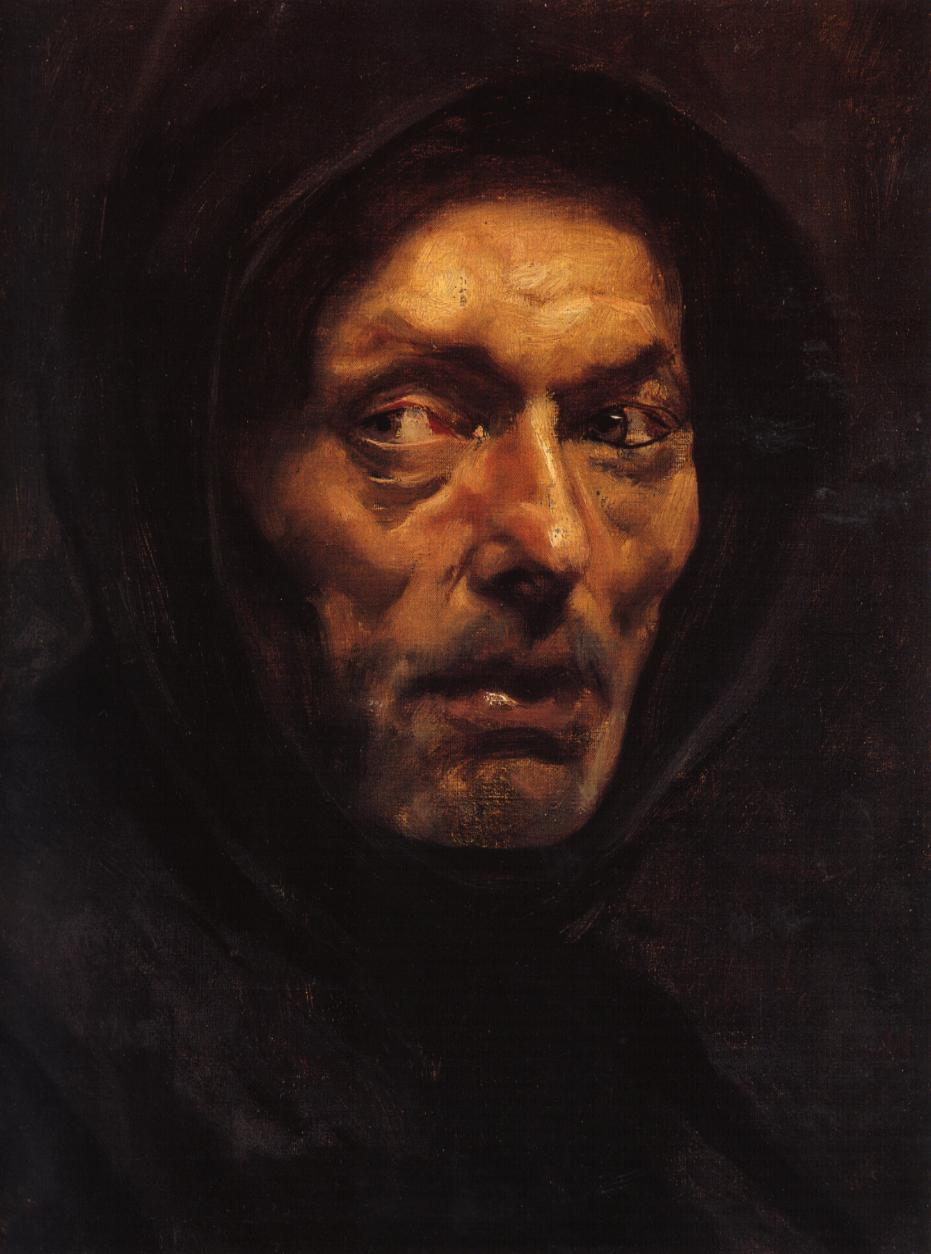
Capuchin friar by Nikolaos Gyzis.

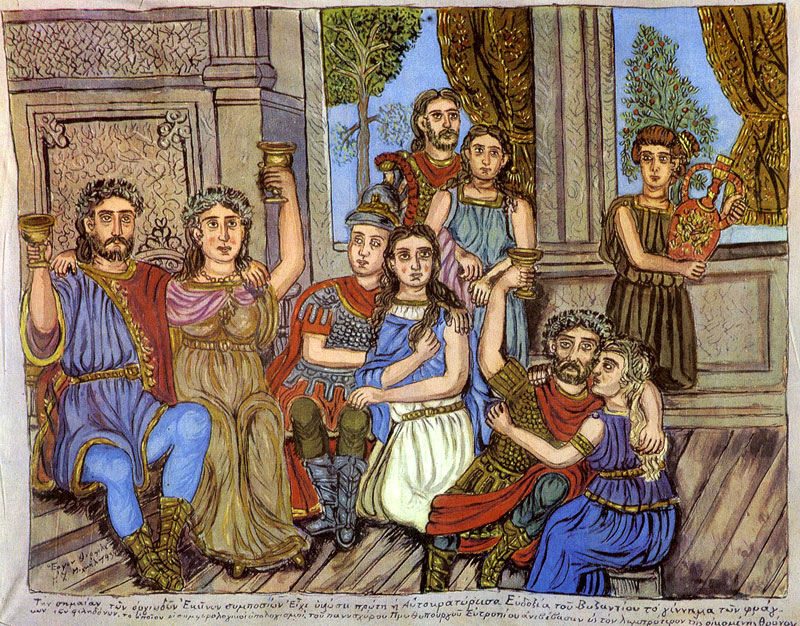
Theofilos Hatzimichail, Symposium of Empress Eudoxia.

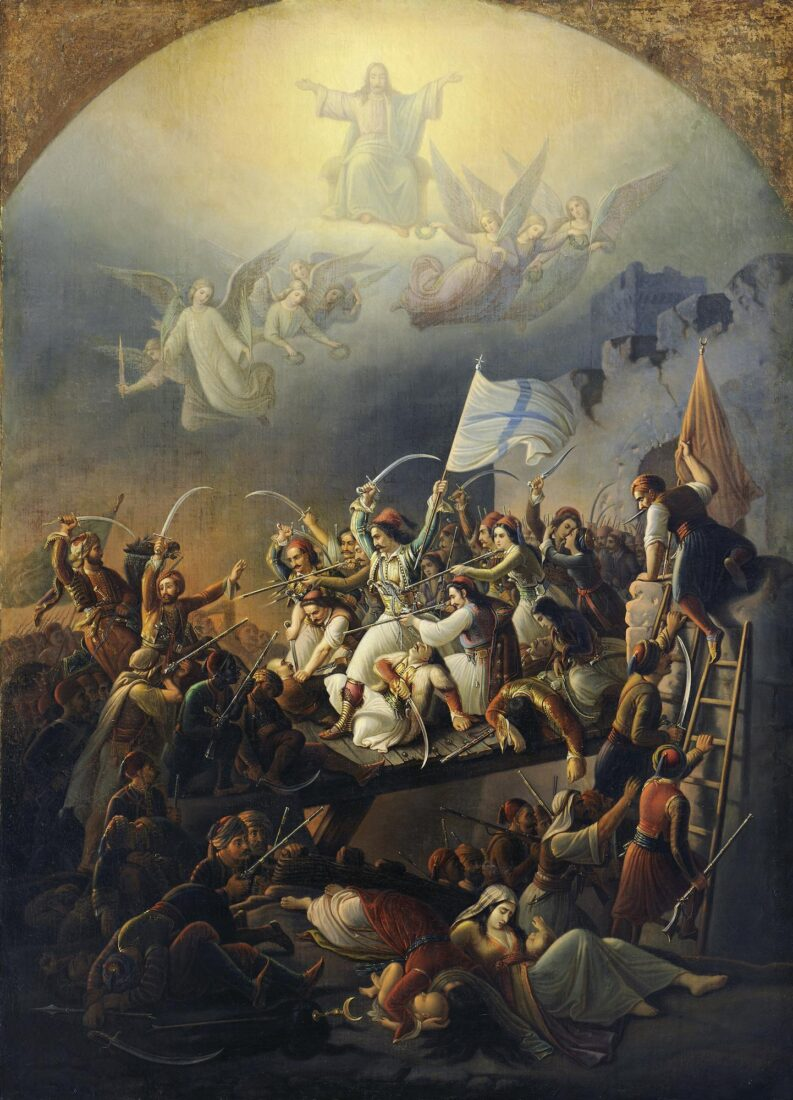
Theodoros Vryzakis, The sortie of Messologhi.

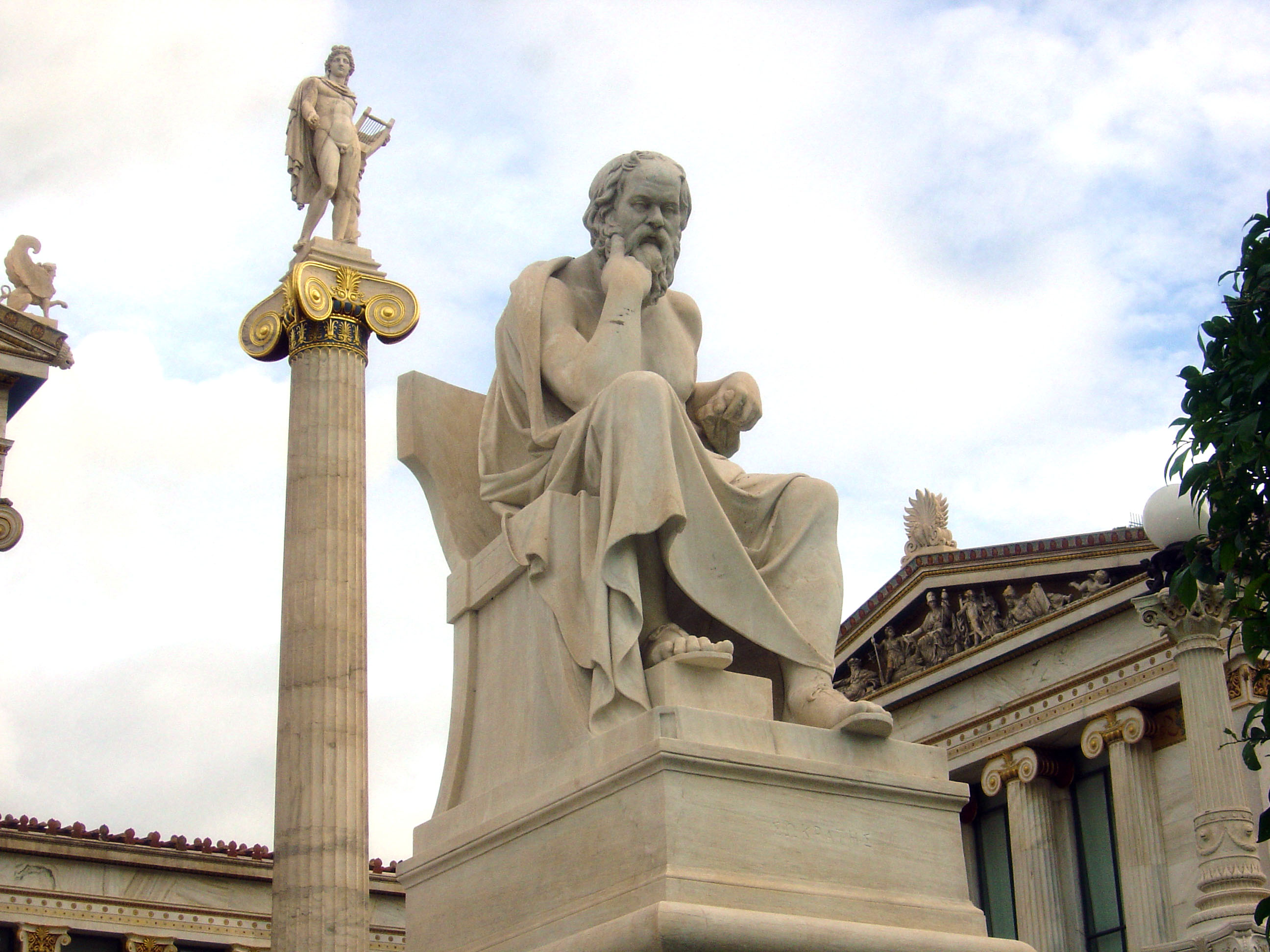
Statue of Socrates by Leonidas Drosis.

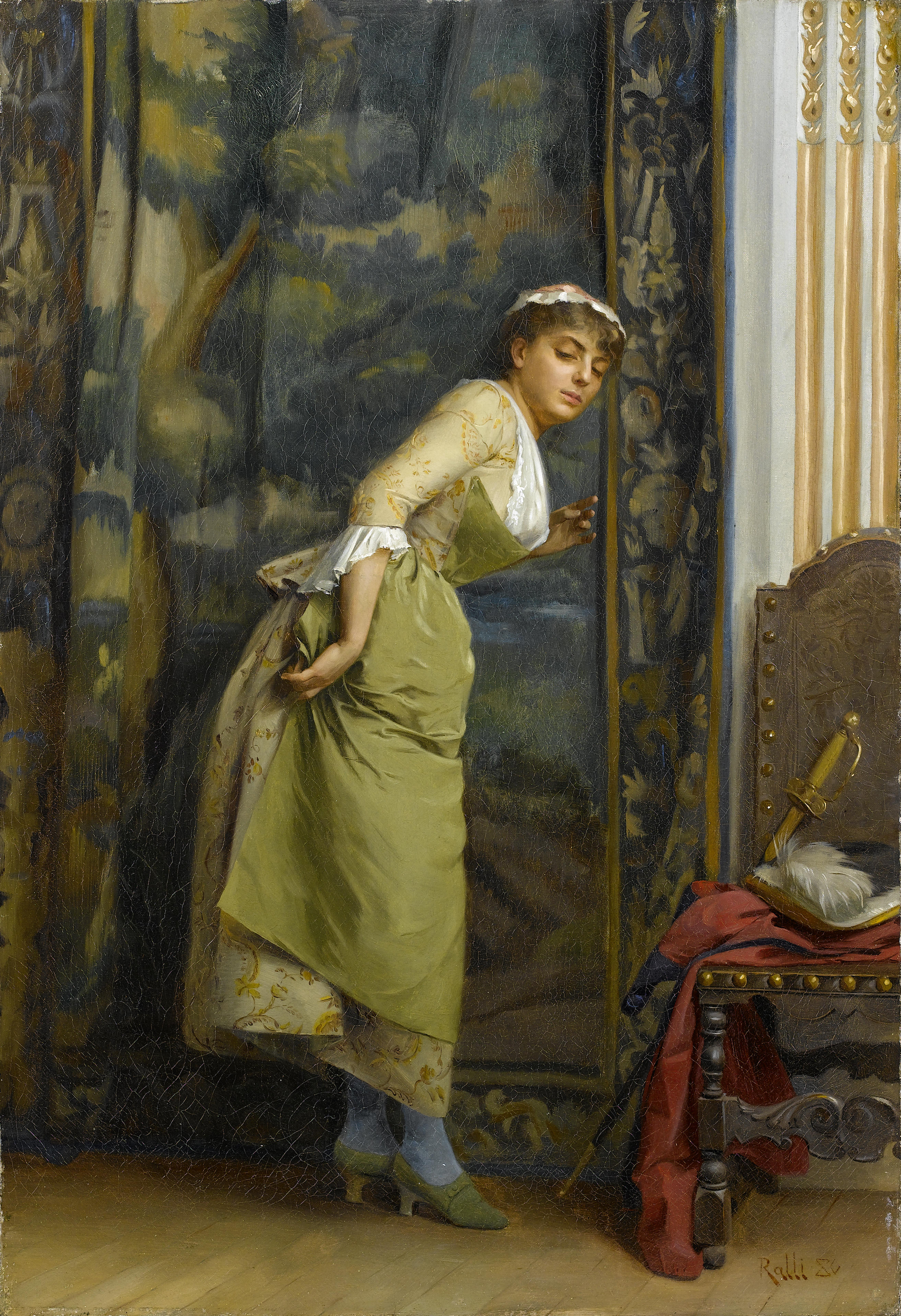
Theodore Ralli, Eavesdropping.

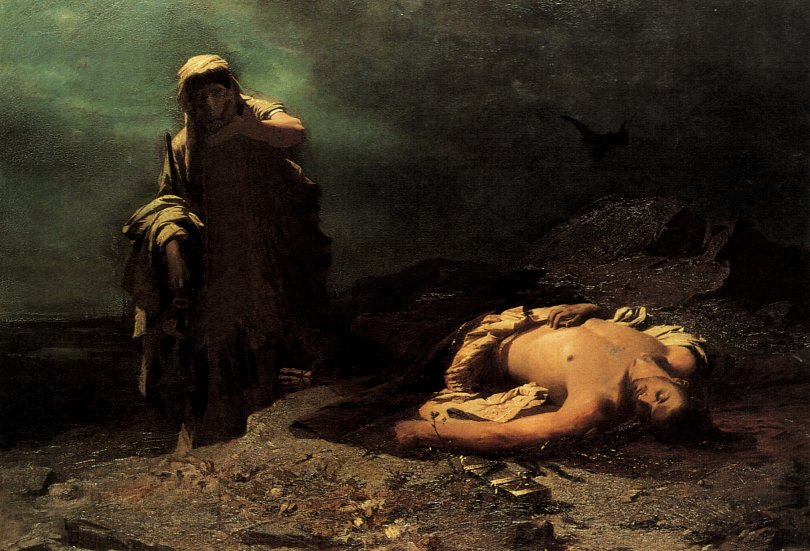
Nikiphoros Lytras, Antigone in front of the dead Polynices.

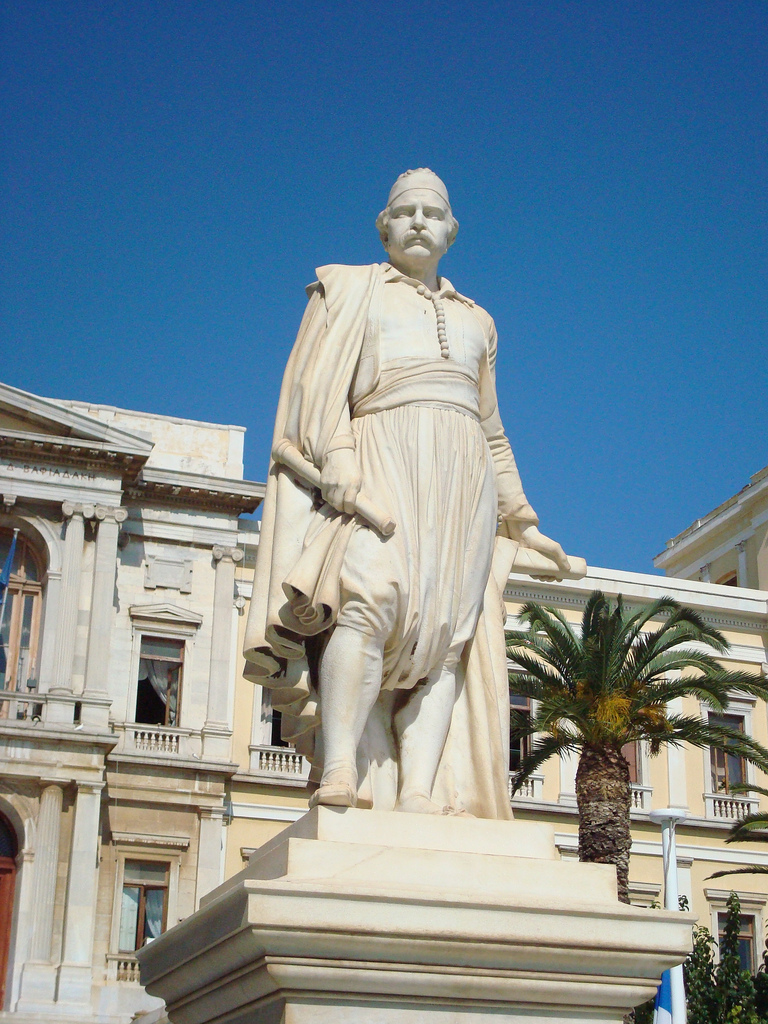
Statue of Andreas Miaoulis in Ermoupoli by Georgios Bonanos.

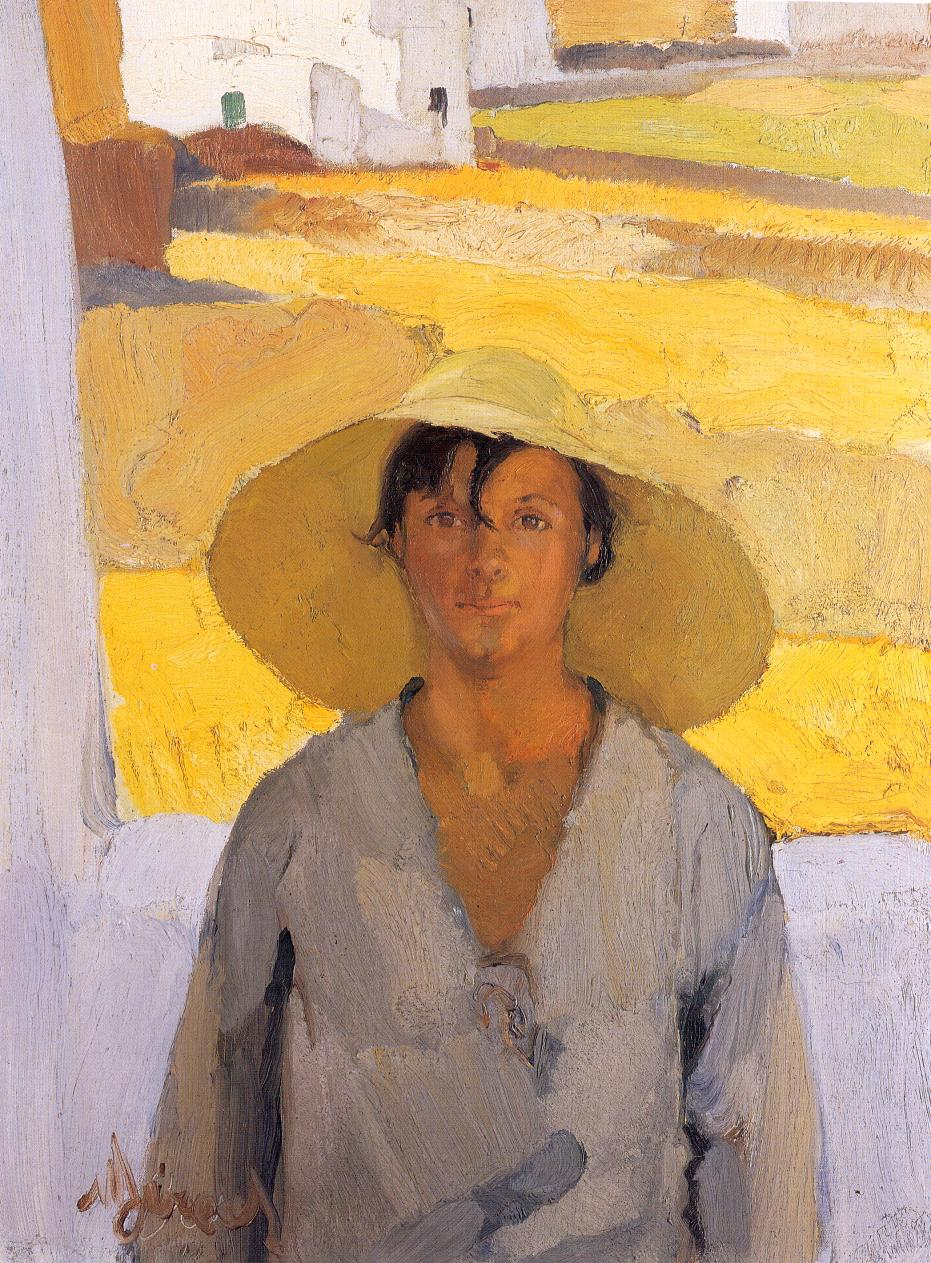
Nikolaos Lytras, The straw-hat.

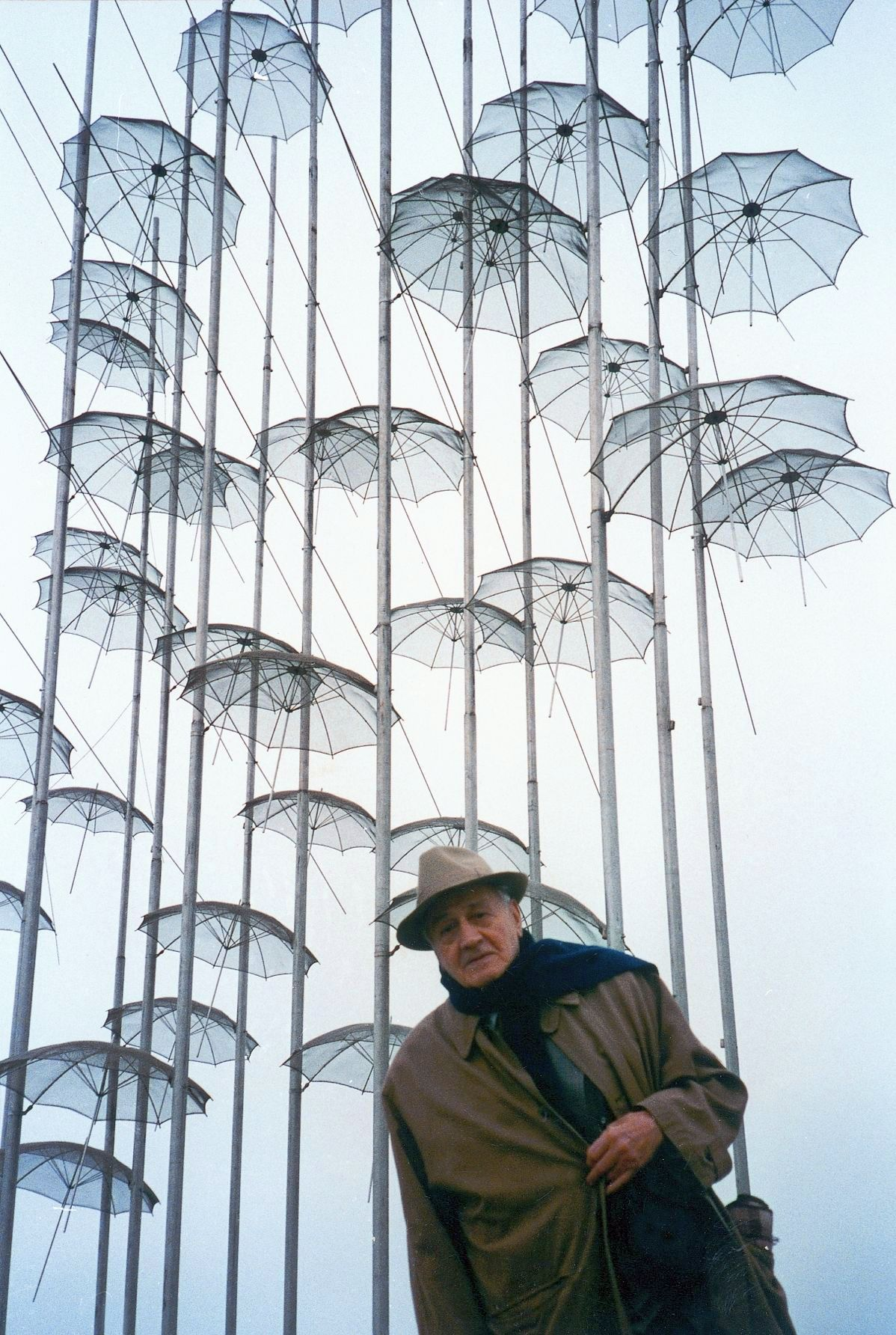
The "umbrellas" of Zongolopoulos in Thessaloniki.

== See also ==
- Culture of Greece
- Modern Greek architecture
- Mycenaean Revival architecture
- National Gallery of Athens
