= The Dirge in Psara =

Painting by Nikiforos Lytras

- Το ψαριανό μοιρολόι (Greek)
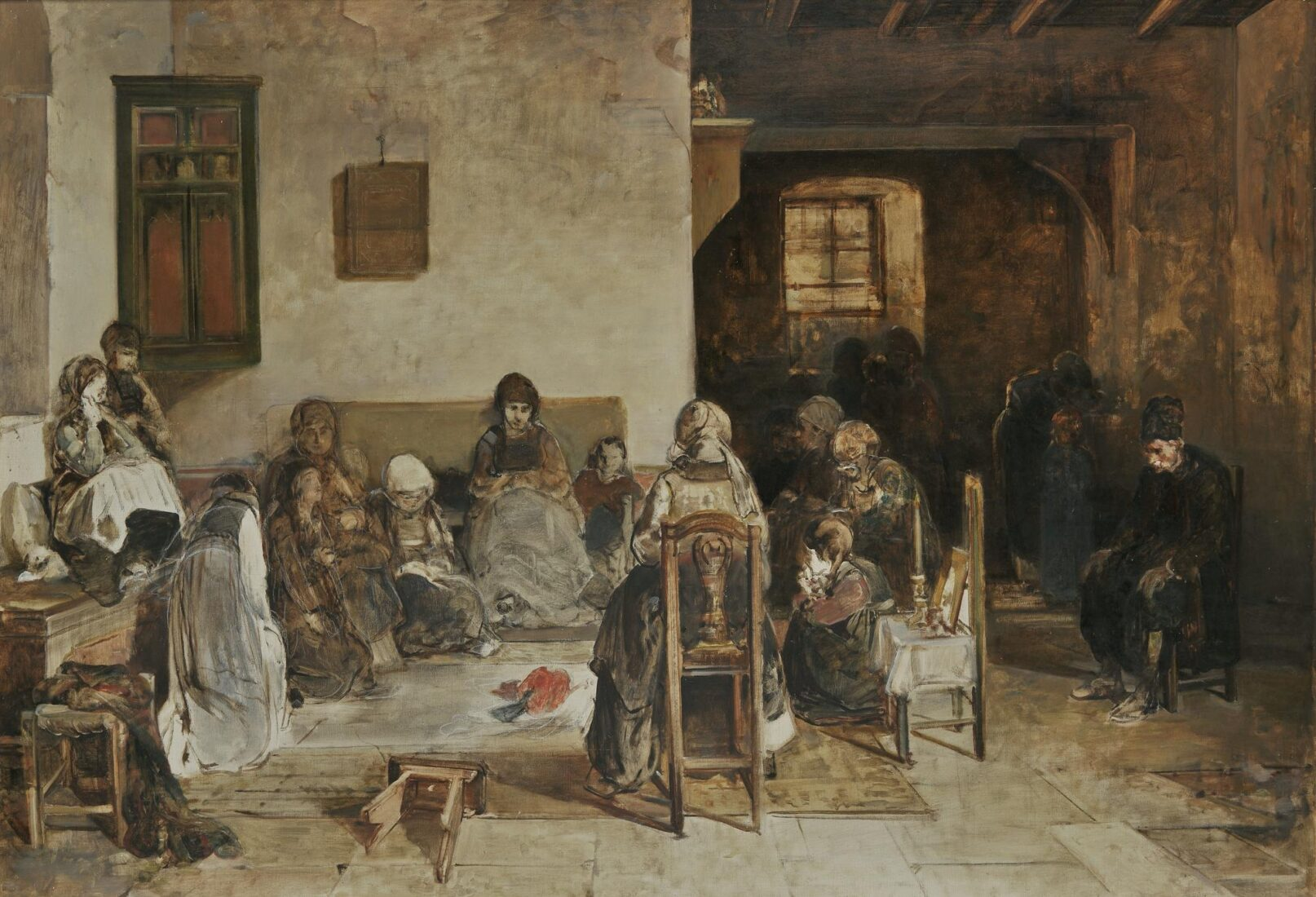
- Artist: Nikiforos Lytras
- Year: before 1888
- Medium: Oil on canvas
- Dimensions: 97 cm × 140 cm (38 in × 55 in)
- Location: National Gallery; Athens

The Dirge in Psara is a painting by Nikiforos Lytras, dated to before 1888. The painting is an oil on canvas with dimensions of 97 x 140 centimeters. It is part of the collection of the National Gallery, in Athens.

== Analysis ==
The scene shows a family mourning for a lost sailor. This is one of the most well-known paintings of Lytras Nikiforos. The common people's customs and their life incidents was a source of inspiration to the painter. The relatives mourn for the lost sailor. They are sitting solemnly, in silence, around his fez. The dull colours, the organization of the interior of the place, and faces indistinct of characteristics express the inner crush of the people as well as the surrounding atmosphere of grief and mourning. The painting, "The Dirge in Psara", belongs to the era of maturity of Lytras (1888) and, beyond the moral-forming element of mourning, it presents the absent sailor, who is lost forever to the bottom of the sea. This requires a great deal of mental ability and courage for a 19th-century painter to represent the mute void, which replaces a body, with the exception of the red fez. It is yet more tragic the mute mourning of the women at the bright left side of the painting and of the elderly at the dark right side of the threadbare place. The painter's will to symbolize is evident in one more detail: the fallen stool, which represents the end, death.
