= Périclès Pantazis =

Greek painter

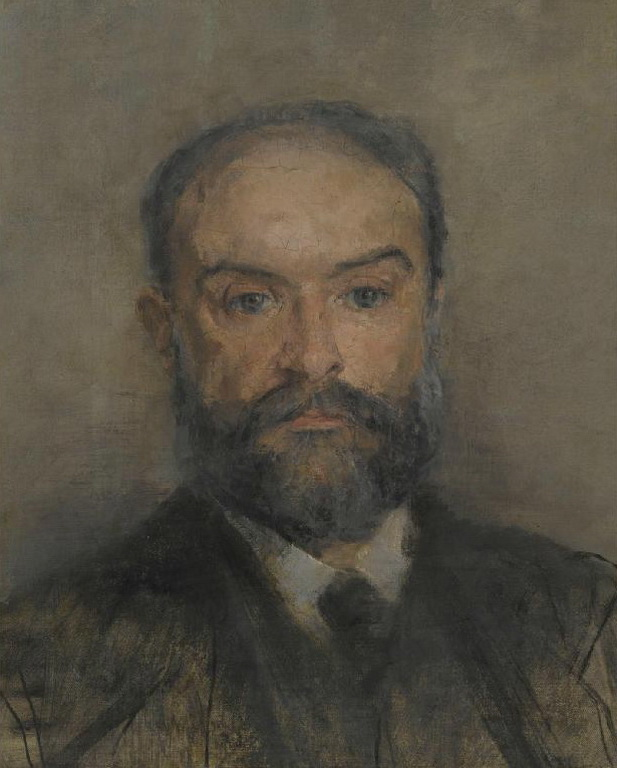
Périclès Pantazis, selfportrait (by 1884)

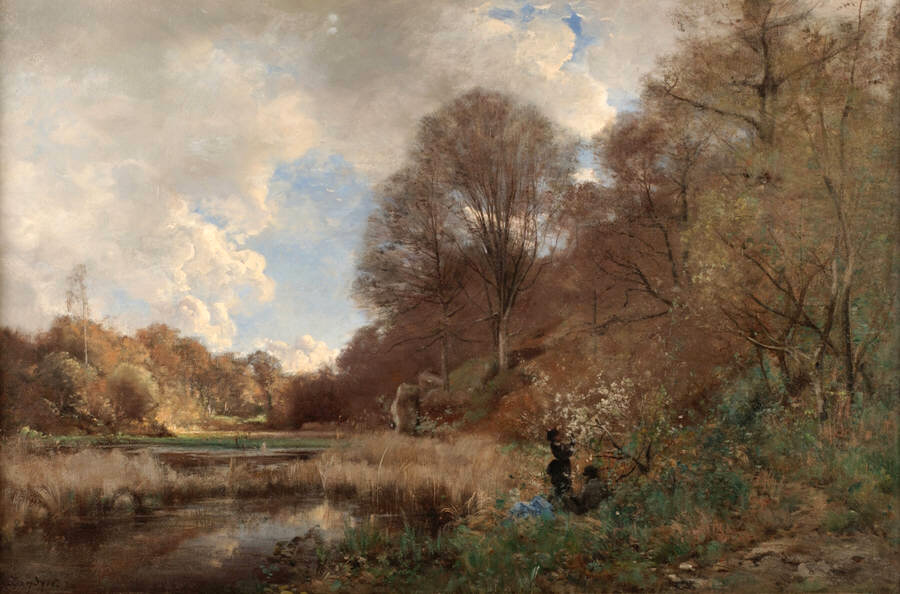
Périclès Pantazis, Summer Day at the River (1880)

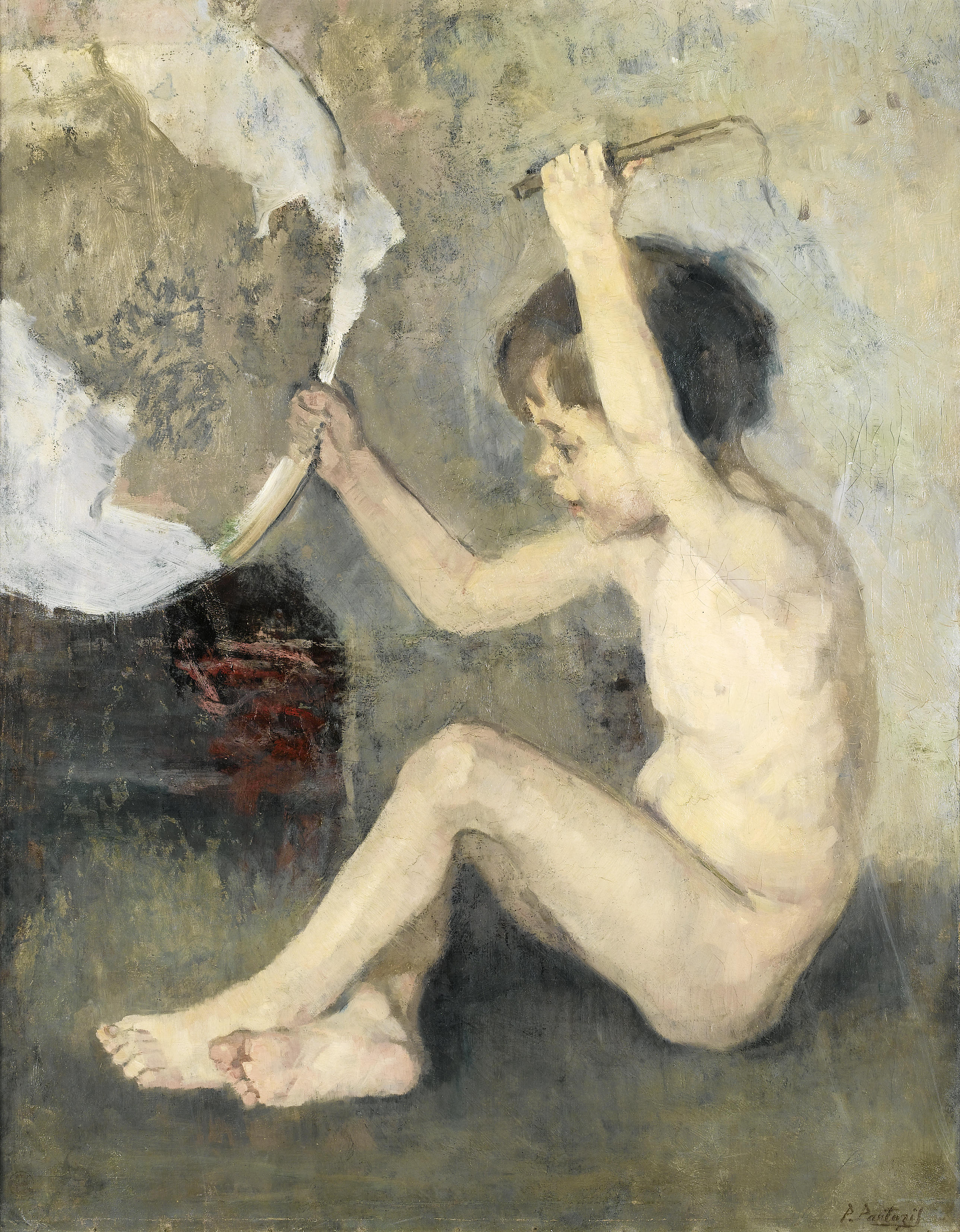
L' Enfant au cerceau (unknown date)

Périclès Pantazis (Greek: Περικλής Πανταζής, Periklis Pantazis; 13 March 1849, Athens – 25 January 1884, Brussels) was a major Greek impressionist painter of the 19th century who gained a great reputation as an artist initially in Belgium.

== Life ==
Pantazis studied painting at the Athens School of Fine Arts from 1864 to 1871 under Nikiforos Lytras. He continued his studies in Munich for one year and then left for Marseille and Paris. In Paris he was taught by Gustave Courbet and Antoine Chintreuil. At this period he was introduced to the works of Eugène Boudin, Johan Barthold Jongkind and the impressionists Manet, Camille Pissarro and Degas.

In 1873, with a reference letter from Manet, he moved to Brussels, Belgium. A notable Greek wine businessman, Jean Économou, was particularly interested in his skills and commissioned a large number of Pantazis paintings. In Belgium, Pantazis became a member of an anti-academic artistic group called La Patte de Dindon, and a member of Les XX.

He became close friends with painter Guillaume Vogels and sculptor, Auguste Philippette, whose sister he married a few years later. In Brussels, initially he worked as a home decorator for Vogels, but later he was dedicated to painting as he became increasingly known for his talent. In 1878 he represented Greece at the Exposition Universelle in Paris. He died of chronic tuberculosis at the age of 34.

== Museums ==
- Antwerp, Koninklijk Museum voor Schone Kunsten
- Brussels, Koninklijke Musea voor Schone Kunsten van België
- Oostende, KaZ
- Sint-Niklaas, Stedelijk Museum

== See also ==
- Greek Art
- Art in modern Greece
- National Gallery (Athens)

== Sources ==
- Georgia Dracopoulou, Pericles Pantazis and the Belgian Painting of the 19th Century, Athens, 1982, p. 115, illustrated
- Serge Goyens de Heusch, Olga Metzafou-Polyzou & Stephanos Samaras, Pericles Pantazis, Athens, 1994, pp. 52 & 212, no. 184, ISBN 960-85143-7-1
