= Thanassis Stephopoulos =

Greek artist (1928–2012)

- Born: Thanassis Stephopoulos; 1 June 1928; Amfissa, Phocis
- Died: 29 December 2012 (aged 84); Athens, Greece
- Known for: Painting

Thanassis Stephopoulos (Greek: Θανάσης Στεφόπουλος, 1 June 1928 – 29 December 2012) was one of Greece's most important 20th-century painters, teachers and philosophers of art. He was famous for his works, representing a genre of painting which he had introduced, the abstract landscape painting. He was one of the most important representatives of the so-called Modern Greek art.

== Early life and education ==
Thanassis Stephopoulos was born in Amfissa, Phocis. His father, who was a self-taught iconographer, died in 1931. In 1946 completed his school studies while attending the preliminary section of the Athens School of Fine Arts with professors Dimitrios Biskinis and Pavlos Mathiopoulos, and in 1947 with Yiannis Moralis.

From 1947 on, he continuously showed his work to Spyros Papaloukas and Nikos Hadjikyriakos-Ghikas, from whose advice/guidance he benefited greatly. In 1952 he received a painting diploma with two honors "Outdoors" and a "Certificate of the Theoretical and Historical Lessons". From 1952 to 1954 he attended classes in engraving by the master Giannis Kefallinos, one of the most important Greek art teachers.

In May 1954, he received a scholarship from the University of Athens for two years and from 1956 to 1957 a scholarship from the State Scholarship Foundation and continued his studies in Paris.

== First Period ==
In Paris, he studied painting at the École nationale supérieure des Beaux-Arts from 1954 to 1957 under the direction of Maurice Brianchon. Alongside, during 1954 and 1955, he studied lithography with professor René Jaudon. From 1955 to 1957 at the École pratique des hautes études he studied architectural analysis of the ancient Greek style and anecdotal evidence for Delphi with professor Pierre de La Coste-Messelière who was also the department manager. In 1958 he attended the first and second year of studies at the École du Louvre and also the general history of art.

Having studied for many years in Greece and abroad, with guidance from important artists he continued until 1964. The resulting sensory perception in this first period of his work is the series of Nature morte, which were exposed for the first time in France at the Musée d'Art Moderne de la Ville de Paris, in Salon d'Automne at Grand Palais, at Musée des Beaux-Arts de Rouen and elsewhere. Many art critics have studied his paintings and in the newspaper Beaux-Arts M.Sauriere wrote: "...la belle nature morte aux oiseaux noirs de Stephopoulos..."

== Second Period ==
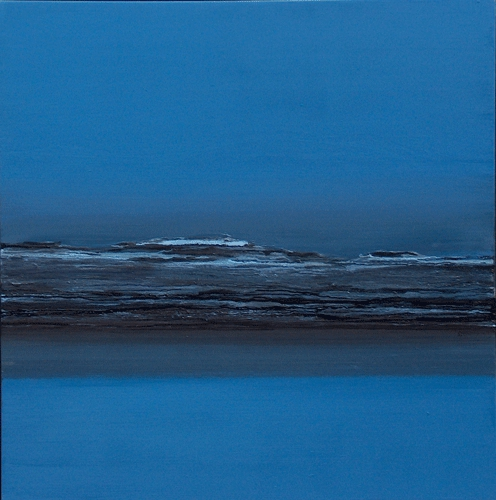
Contemplation of the Aegean

In the second period he was evidently in search of freedom. This search is interpreted in the re-composition of plastic elements of the painting, creating new pictures in the spirit of abstraction. These quests, which started in 1959, and lasted for over ten years, were exposed for the first time in 1960 in individual exhibitions on "New Forms" and "Astor". Abstraction will henceforth affect in different ways his work until the end.

== Third Period ==
In the third period there are elements from his previous work, featuring himself and his motion. In the latter period, overcoming difficulties and arbitrariness that we meet to divide the life and work of an artist into periods, accumulating plastics expressing contemplation, soul searching, contemplation, usually creating three zones which remind us of the counterpoint in music. Thus creating his own artistic space.

== Works from the Third Period ==
"After the battle, pheasant" by Thanassis Stephopoulos (Charcoal drawing - 1995)

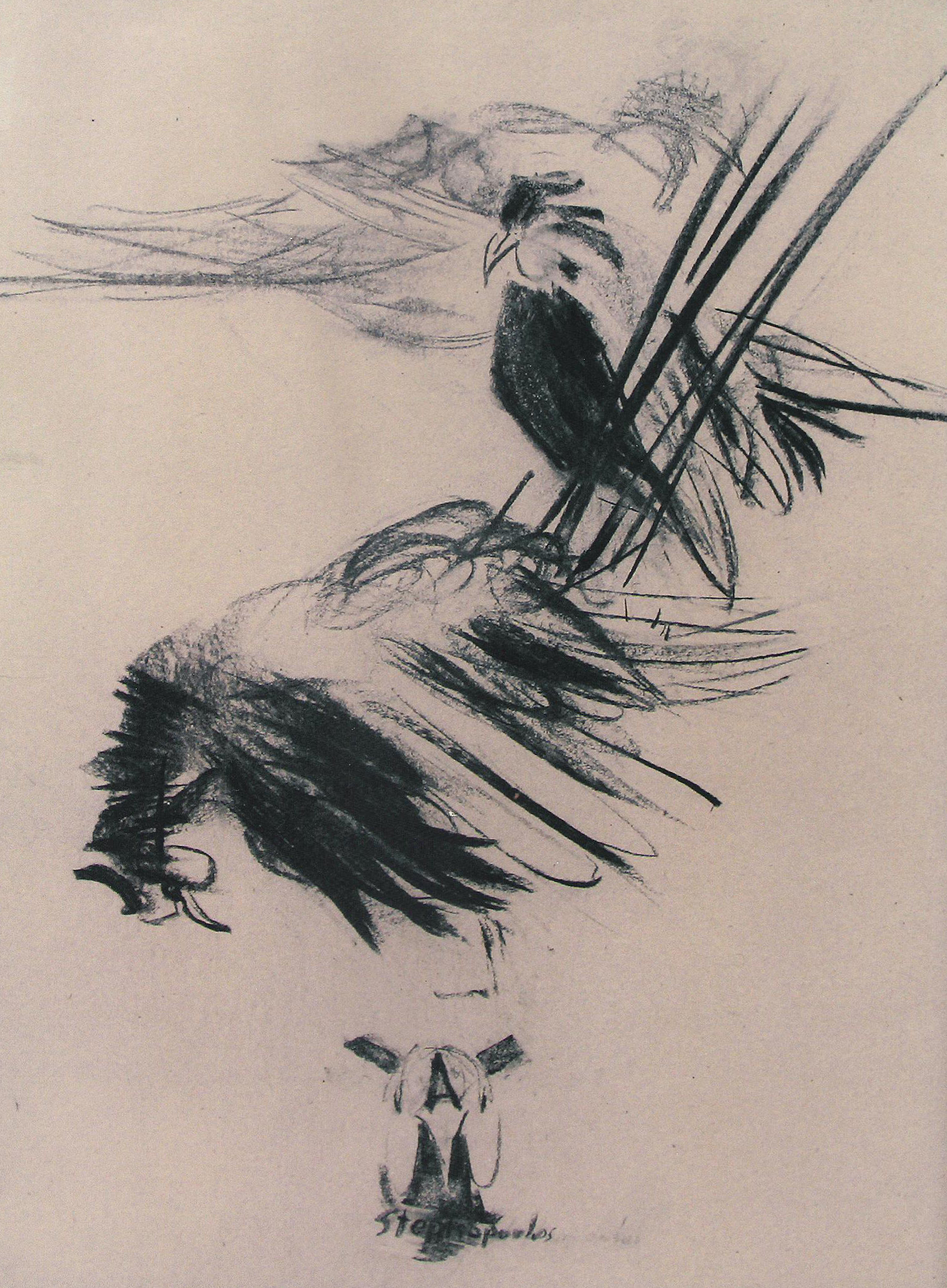
"Birds" by Thanassis Stephopoulos (Charcoal drawing - 1996)

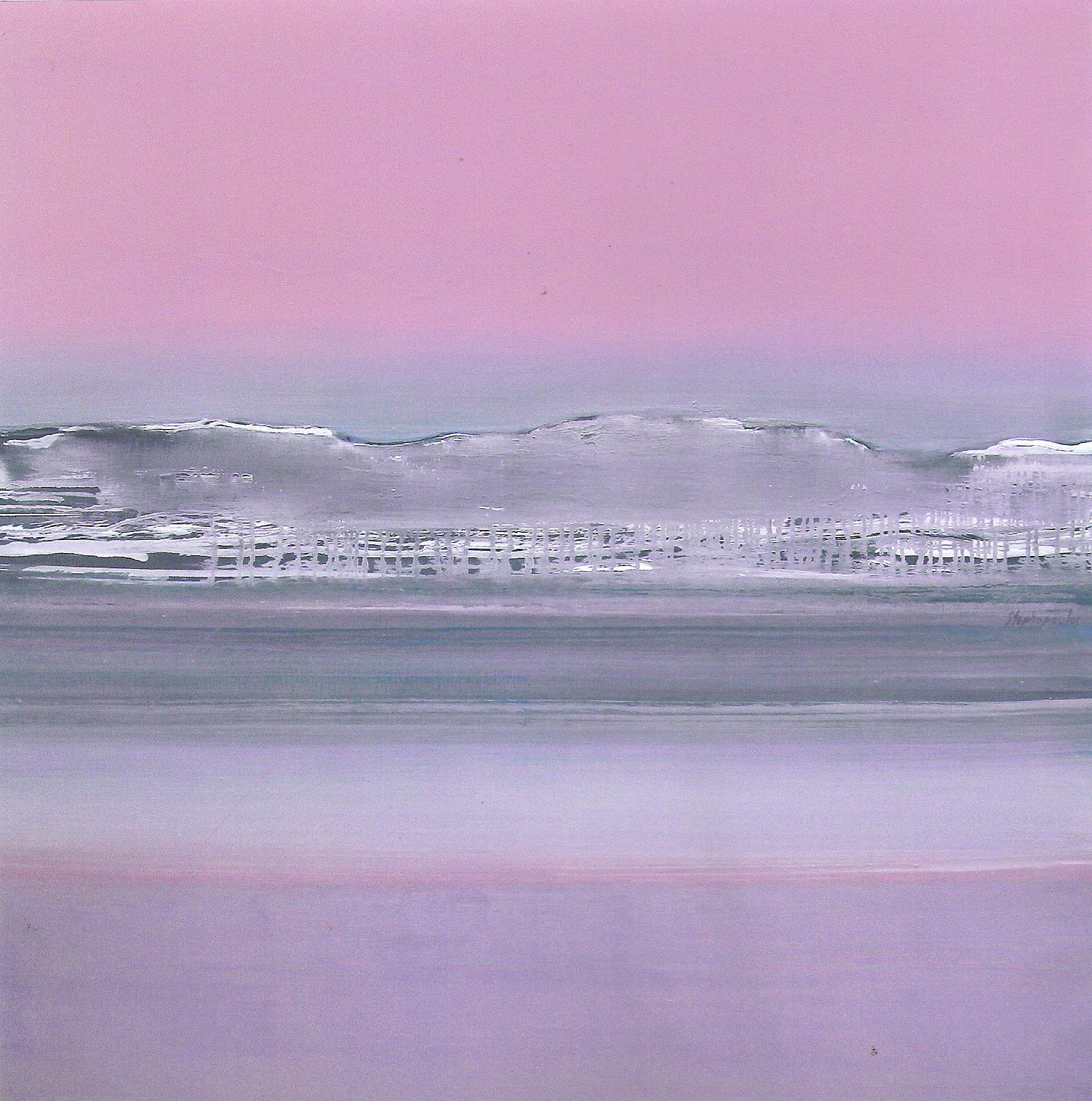
"Feedback of art" by Thanassis Stephopoulos (Oil - 2004)

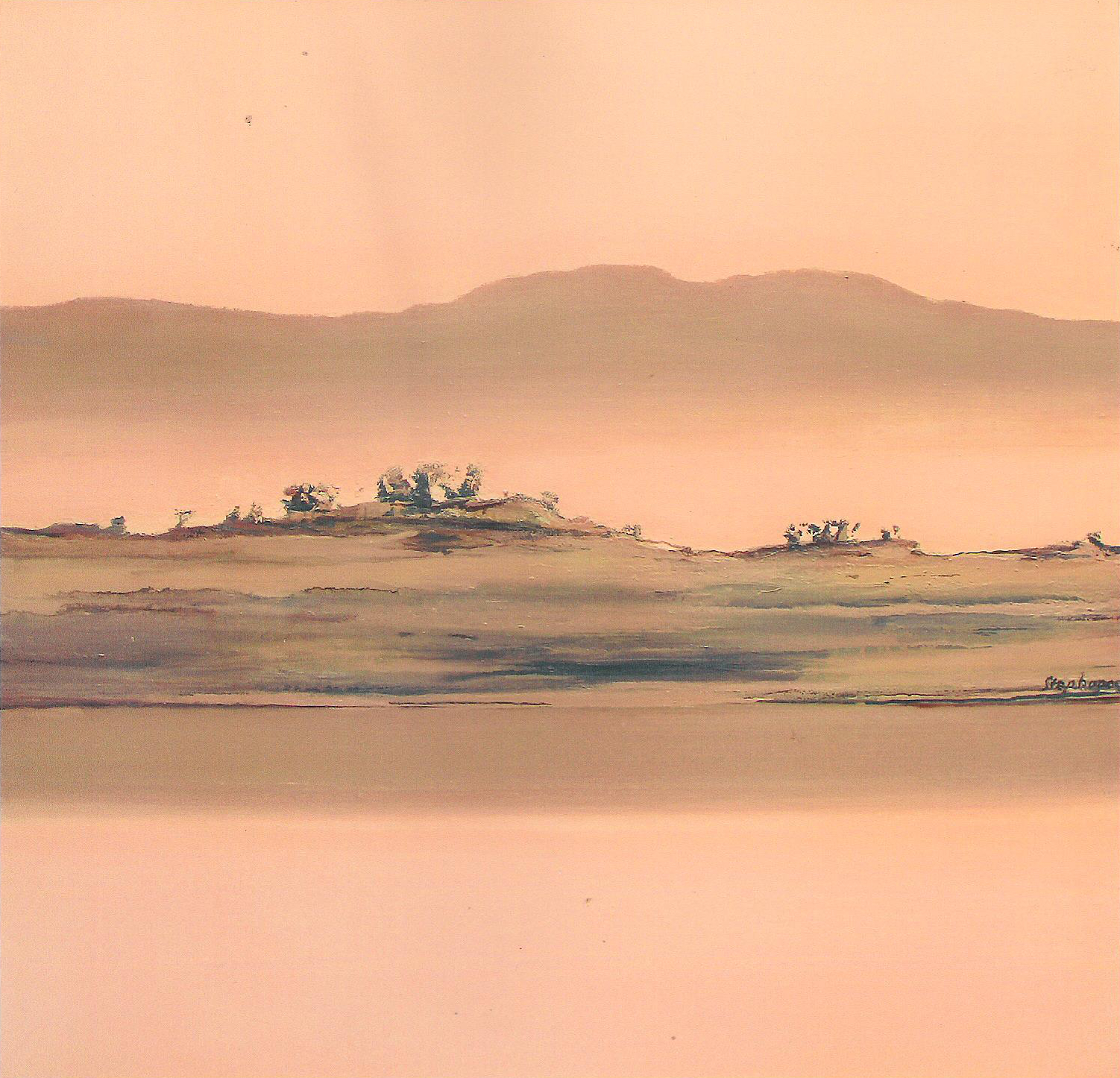
"Asian Yellow" by Thanassis Stephopoulos (Oil - 2005)

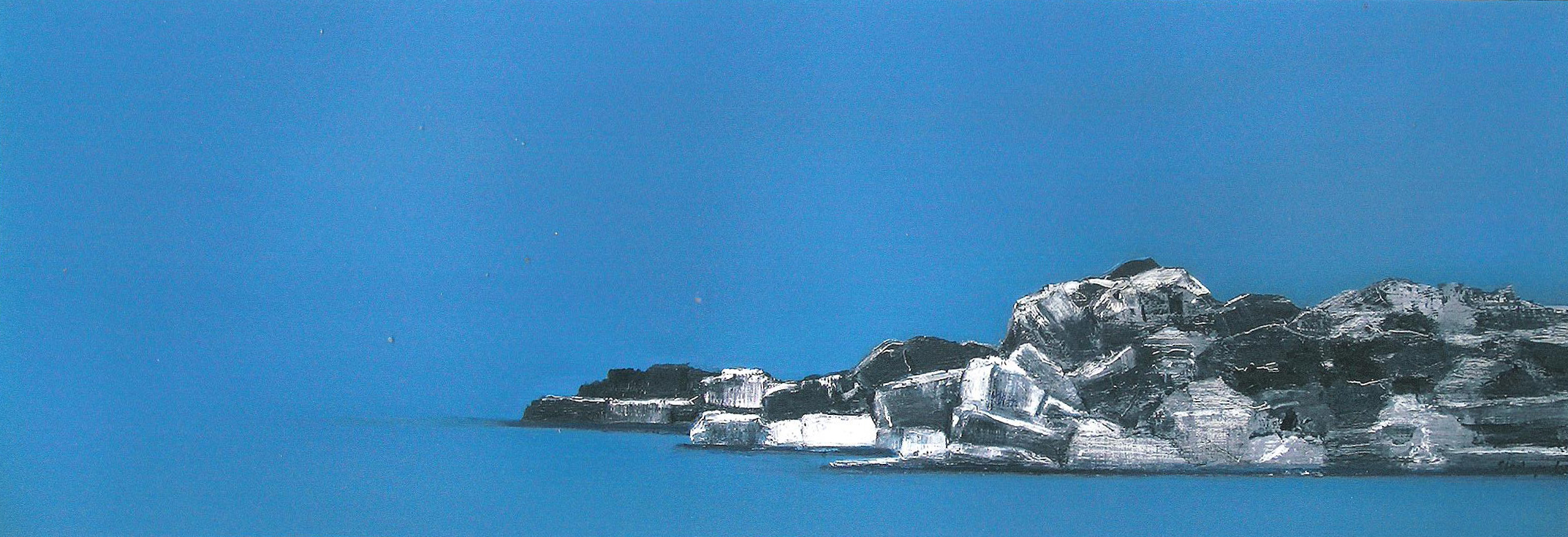
"Influential analogy" by Thanassis Stephopoulos (Oil - 2007)

== Ηonorary awards ==
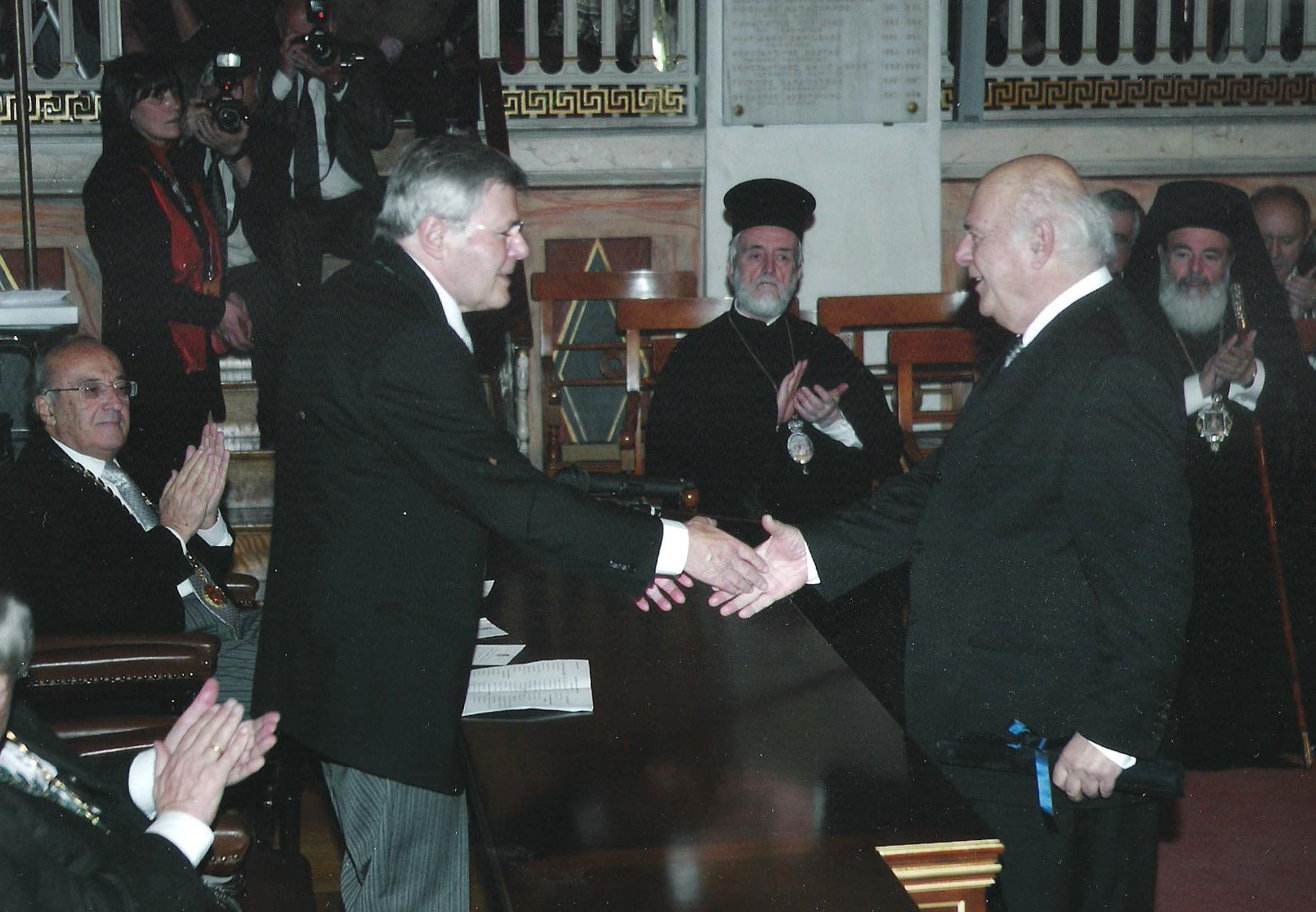
Festive meeting of the Academy of Athens 2006

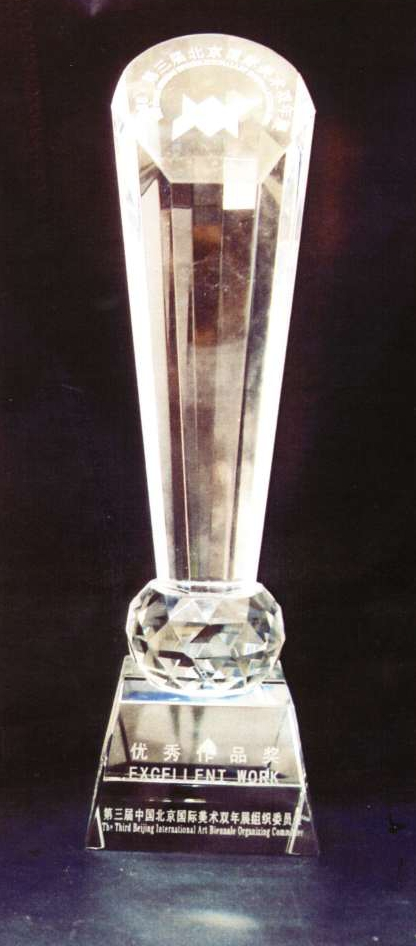
Excellent Work Award

- In the festive meeting of the Academy of Athens on 28 December 2006, he was awarded the Prize of the Order of Letters and Fine Arts, for his total contribution to the Greek art.
- In the Third International Art Biennale of Beijing in 2008, China, themed "Colors of Olympism", he was awarded the “Excellent Work Award”, for his work “Aegean”.

== Exhibitions ==
Exhibitions Attended (Most important of them):

- 1956, Museum of Modern Art, Paris, France
- 1956, Salon d'Automne Gran Palais, Paris, France
- 1958, 2nd Mediterranean Biennale of Alexandria, National Mission, Egypt
- 1959, 10th Salon de la Jeune Peinture, Museum of Modern Art, Paris, France
- 1962, Greek Painters and Sculptors, Museum of Modern Art, Paris, France
- 1966, Greek Artists, Gallery Newburgh, London, UK
- 1974, C.N.A. Gallery, Chicago Illinois, US
- 1975, Biennale São Paulo, National Mission, Brazil
- 1978, Institut fur Auslandsbeziehungen, Stuttgart, Germany, organized by the National Gallery of Athens
- 1988, By the occasion of the Greek Presidency of EEC, paintings which belong to the Greek National Gallery of Athens, Brussels
- 1994, National Gallery of Athens, Greece
- 1996, “Navy Week”, Βattleship Averof, Athens, Greece
- 2008, “Contemplation of the Aegean”, Multiplex "Apollon", Piraeus, Greece
- 2010, "35 Artists exposing their works on World Poverty", UNESCO, Athens, Greece

== Bibliography ==
Printed Encyclopedias

- Encyclopedia Pyrsos (In Greek: ΠΥΡΣΟΣ), 1957 and 3rd Additional Issue 1960
- Modern Encyclopedia Eleftheroudakis (In Greek: Ελευθερουδάκη), 3rd Volume, Issue 11
- Encyclopedia Helios (In Greek: Ήλιος), έκδοση 1979
- Soviet Encyclopedia, Volume 32, 1981
- Encyclopedia Papyrus-Larousse-Britannica, Volume 55, page 242, 1996
- Encyclopedia Papyrus-Britannica, 2nd Print, Volume 48, 2007, page 901, 1975

Books

- Encyclopedia of Greek Artists, Melissa Publications, 3rd Volume, July 1976
- Encyclopedia of Greek Artists, Melissa Publications, Volume 4
- Physiognomy of Greek Art, Kedros publications, Helen Vacalo 1981, Volume 1: Abstraction in Greek Art and Volume 2: Expressionism in Greek Art
- The Decalogue of Virtuoso, pages 47–51, Boukouvalas J., 1981
- The History of Amphissa, D. Kravartogiannos, pages 470–473, 1997
- The History and Culture of the Greek Nation from the Beginnings to the Present, Papyrus Publications, 1998
- The Sea in Modern Painting, A, Ioannides, Municipal Gallery of Patras, 1999
- Encyclopedia of Greek Artists, Melissa Publications, New Edition, 2000
- Four Centuries of Greek Painting, Μ. Labraki-Plaka, National Gallery, pages 248–251, 2000
- Ellinomouseio, Six Centuries of Greek Painting, Manos Stefanides, page 265, 2001

Newspapers

- Art (Newspaper in Greek: Εφημερίδα τέχνη), July 1958
- Inspection of art, Issue 136, page 472, April 1966
- Apogeymatini (Newspaper in Greek: Απογευματινή), 1970
- Media News, Issue 35, November 1970
- Pantheon (journal), 20 December 1973
- Aygi (Newspaper in Greek: Αυγή), Face to face, 30 March 1980

Television

1. Interview in Ε.Ι.Ρ.Τ. with S. Linardatos, November 1973
2. «The Age of Images» in ΕΤ1 with Κ. Zaharopoulou, 7 June 2005
3. «Has Taste» in ΕΤ1 with B. Tsoukala, 8 July 2006
4. «Roads» in ΕΤ1 with A. Skiadopoulos, 19 March 2007
5. Radio interview for www.pireasnews.gr with Κ. Drakou, 2008
