= Nikiforos Lytras =

Greek painter (1832–1904)

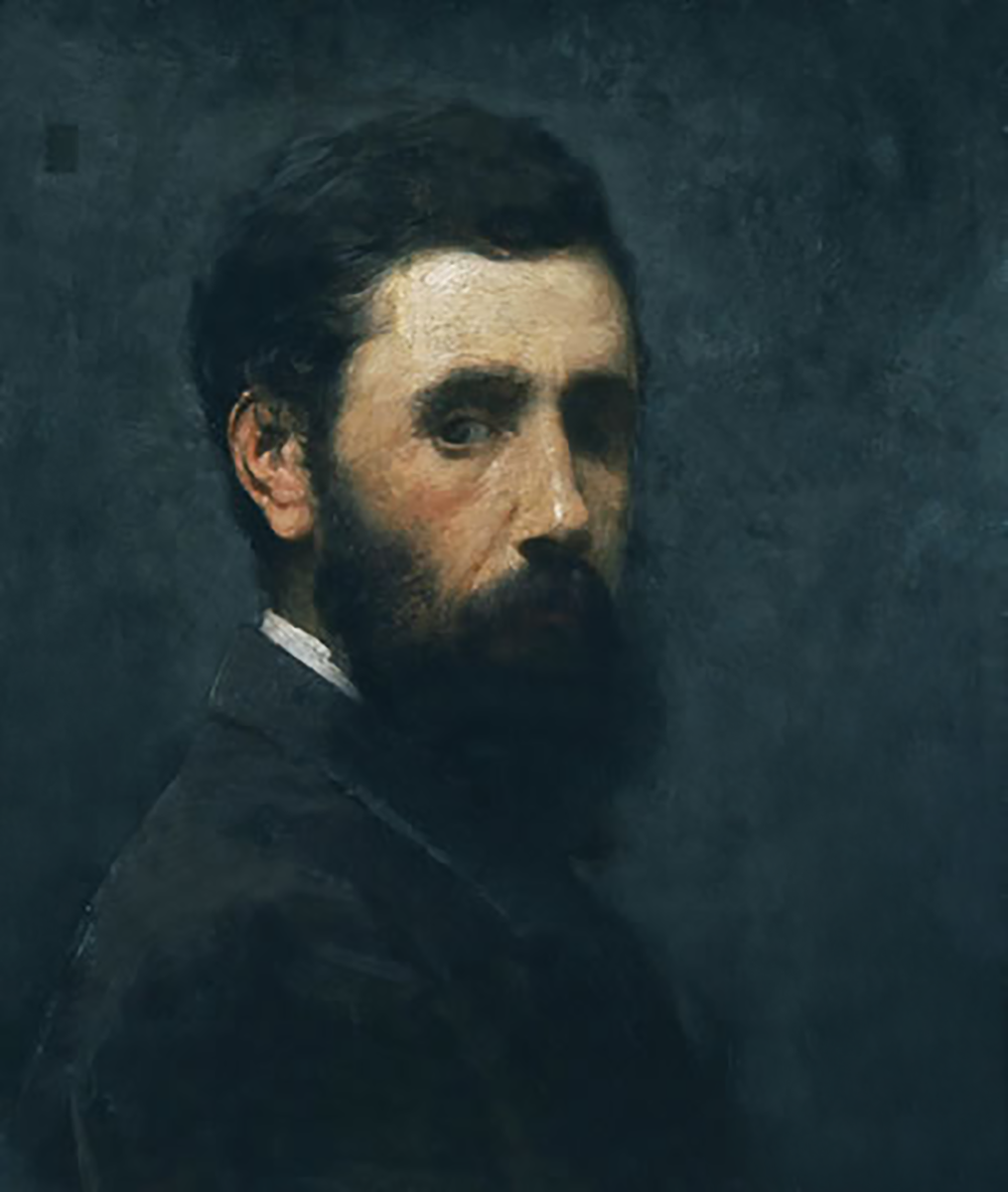
- Νikiforos Lytras, self-portrait
- Born: 1832; Tinos, Greece
- Died: 13 June 1904 (aged 71–72); Athens, Greece
- Education: School of Arts, Athens (1850–60); Royal Academy of Fine Arts, Munich
- Known for: Painter and faculty member
- Movement: Orientalist; Munich School; Genre art
- Spouse: Irene Kyriakidi

Nikiforos Lytras (Greek: Νικηφόρος Λύτρας; 1832 – 13 June 1904) was a Greek painter. He was born in Tinos and trained in Athens at the School of Arts. In 1860, he won a scholarship to Royal Academy of Fine Arts of Munich. After completing these studies, he became a professor at the School of Arts in 1866, a position he held for the rest of his life. He remained faithful to the precepts and principles of the Munich School, while paying greatest attention both to ethnographic themes and portraiture. His most famous portrait was of the royal couple, Otto and Amalia, and his most well-known landscape a depiction of the region of Lavrio.

== Biography ==
Nikiforos Lytras was the son of a popular marble sculptor. In 1850, at the age of eighteen years he went to Athens to study in the School of Arts. He studied painting with Ludwig Thiersch and Raffaelo Ceccoli (c.1800-after 1860). After graduating in 1856, he began teaching an elementary course in writing.

In 1860 with a Greek government's scholarship he went to Munich to study in the Royal Academy of Fine Arts where after some time, he succeeded in being accepted into the classes of Karl von Piloty. In 1862 after King Otto was exiled the scholarship was no longer available to Lytra so the expenses were undertaken by the ambassador of Greece in Vienna Simon Sinas. In the summer of 1865 before his return to Greece he met Nikolaos Gyzis in Munich. There they visited and studied art masterpieces.

Following his return to Athens, Lytras became professor at the Athens School of Fine Arts in the department of Painting and he taught until the time of his death, some 38 years. Spyridon Vikatos was one of his pupils.

For four years, starting in 1873, he travelled to Smyrna and Asia Minor, Munich and Egypt with Gyzis during which he produced a number of Orientalist works.

In 1879 he married Irene Kyriakidi daughter of a tradesman from Smyrna and they had six children. His son Nikolaos Lytras followed in his footsteps by also studying at the Munich academy of Fine Arts and also heading the Athens School of Art. In later life he founded the 'Art Group', which many years later in 1919 exhibited in Paris, with participants including the engraver Demetrios Galanis, a friend of Derain, Braque and Picasso and a member of the French Academy. The nineteenth-century painters Ioannis Altamouras and Periklis Pantazis (both of whom died young) may be regarded as forerunners of this group.

Nikiforos Lytras died at the age of 72 in 1904, after a short illness that is believed to have been caused by his colours' chemical substances. After his death Georgios Jakobides took his place at the Athens School of Fine Arts.

== Art ==
Lytras oeuvre falls into distinct periods. During the time that Lytras was Piloty's student he focused in history painting. His subjects were inspired from Greek Mythology and Greek history. After his return to Greece he started to paint portraits and everyday life scenes. During this period, he wrote that "The painter should devote himself to genre painting, and to subjects that move, delight, and educate the people". His trips in Minor Asia and Egypt enriched his paintings with Oriental themes, including the people and their lifestyles. In the closing years of his life, he painted many scenes about aging, loneliness and the fear of death.

Lytras was one of the most famous painters in Athens. He participated and honored in many exhibitions: at the Zappeion exhibitions, as well as in exhibitions in Paris (1855, 1867, 1878, 1889 and 1900) and in Vienna (1873). Also as he was the official portraitist in Athens and he painted many members of the upper class of his time.

His contribution in art was conceived also through his courses in the Athens School of Fine Arts. Although devoted to the school of Academic Realism and remaining uninfluenced by Impressionism, he marked Greek art history in his own way.

In 1903 he was decorated with the Golden Cross of the Order of the Redeemer. In 1909 – after his death – some of his paintings were presented in Piloty's School (1885–1886) in Munich. In 1933 in Athens School of Fine Arts an exhibition with Lytras' 186 paintings were presented.

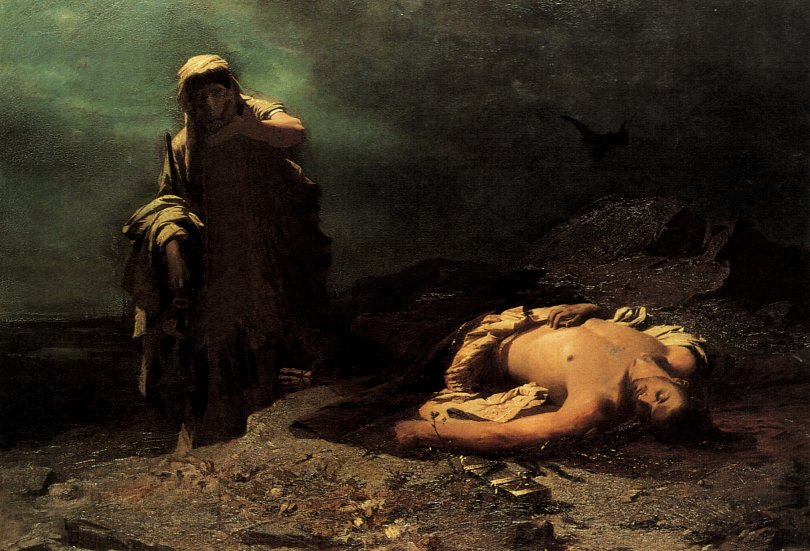
Antigone in front of dead Polynikes (1865), National Gallery of Athens.

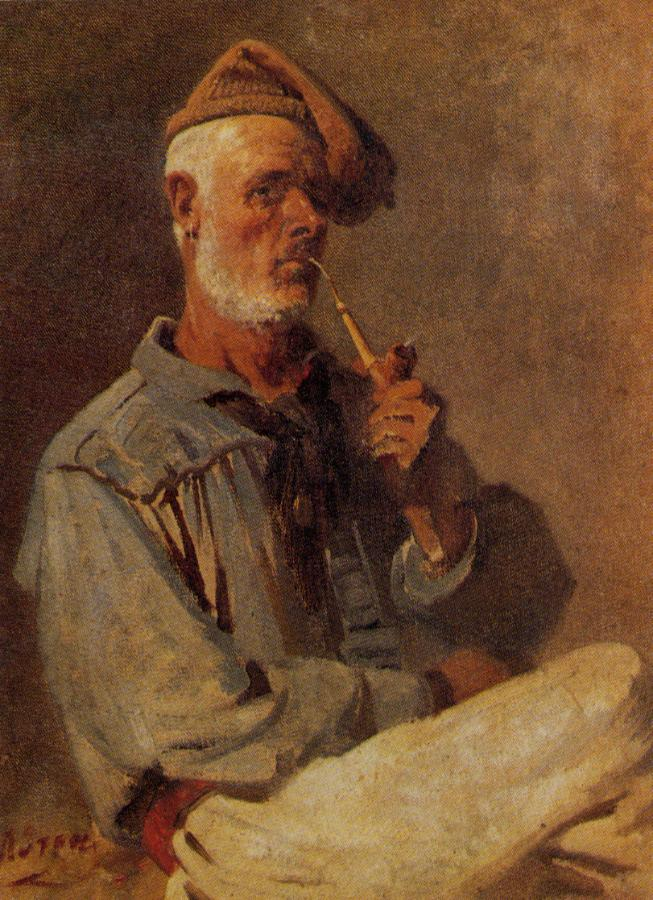
Sailor smoking

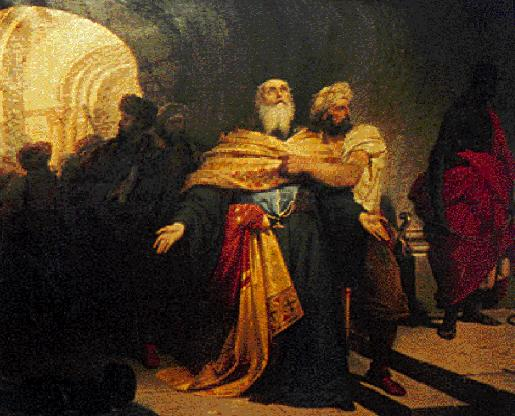
Execution of Patriarch Gregory V of Constantinople

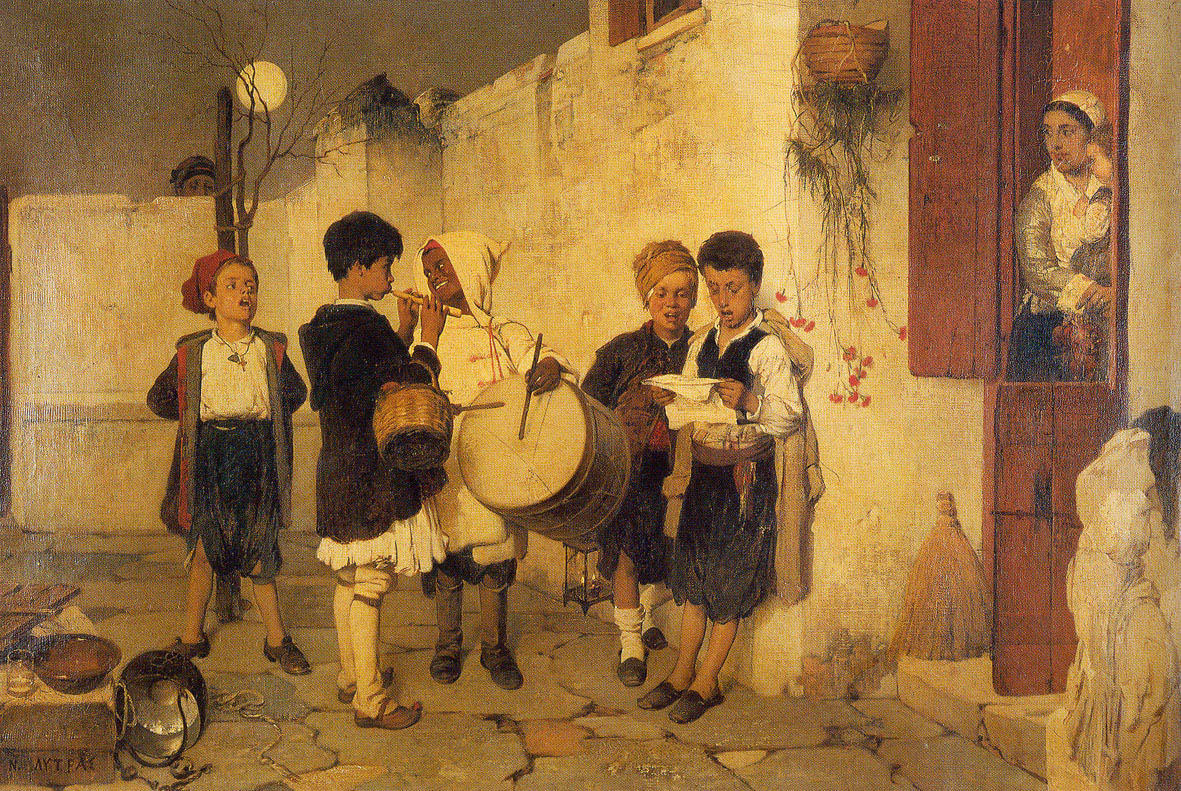
Carols

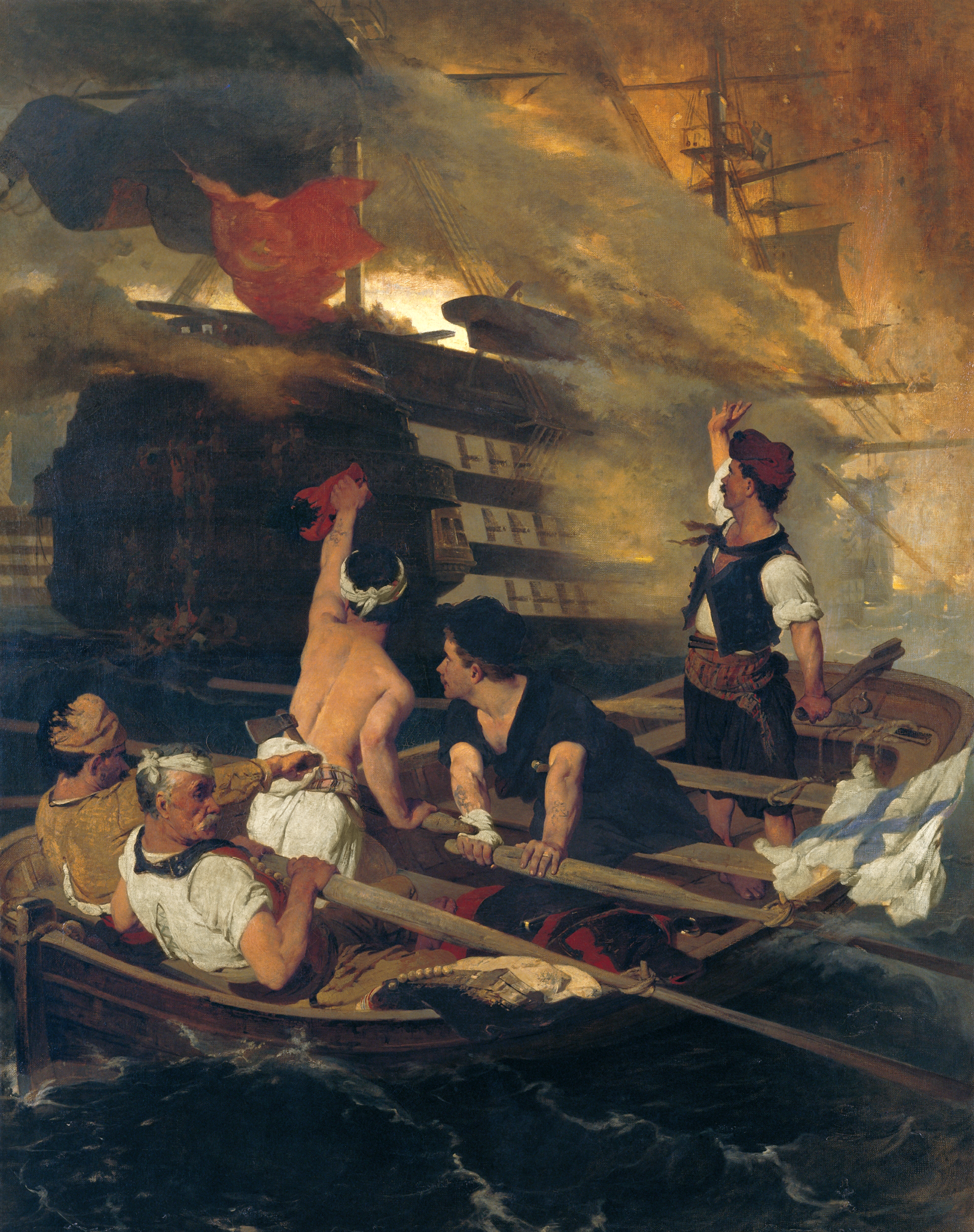
The blowing up of Nasuh Ali Pasha's flagship by Kanaris

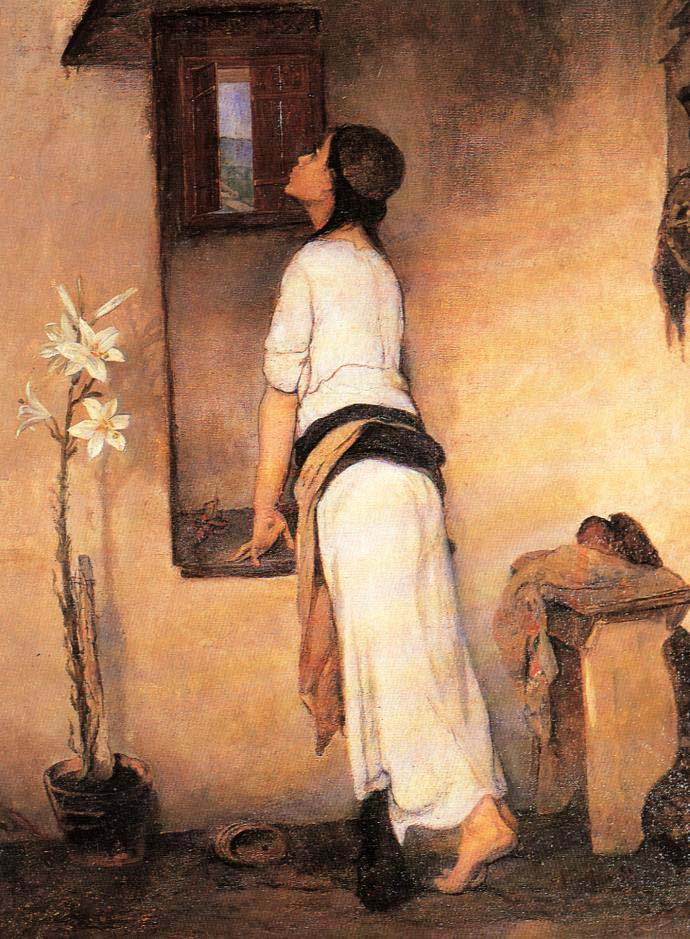
The Waiting

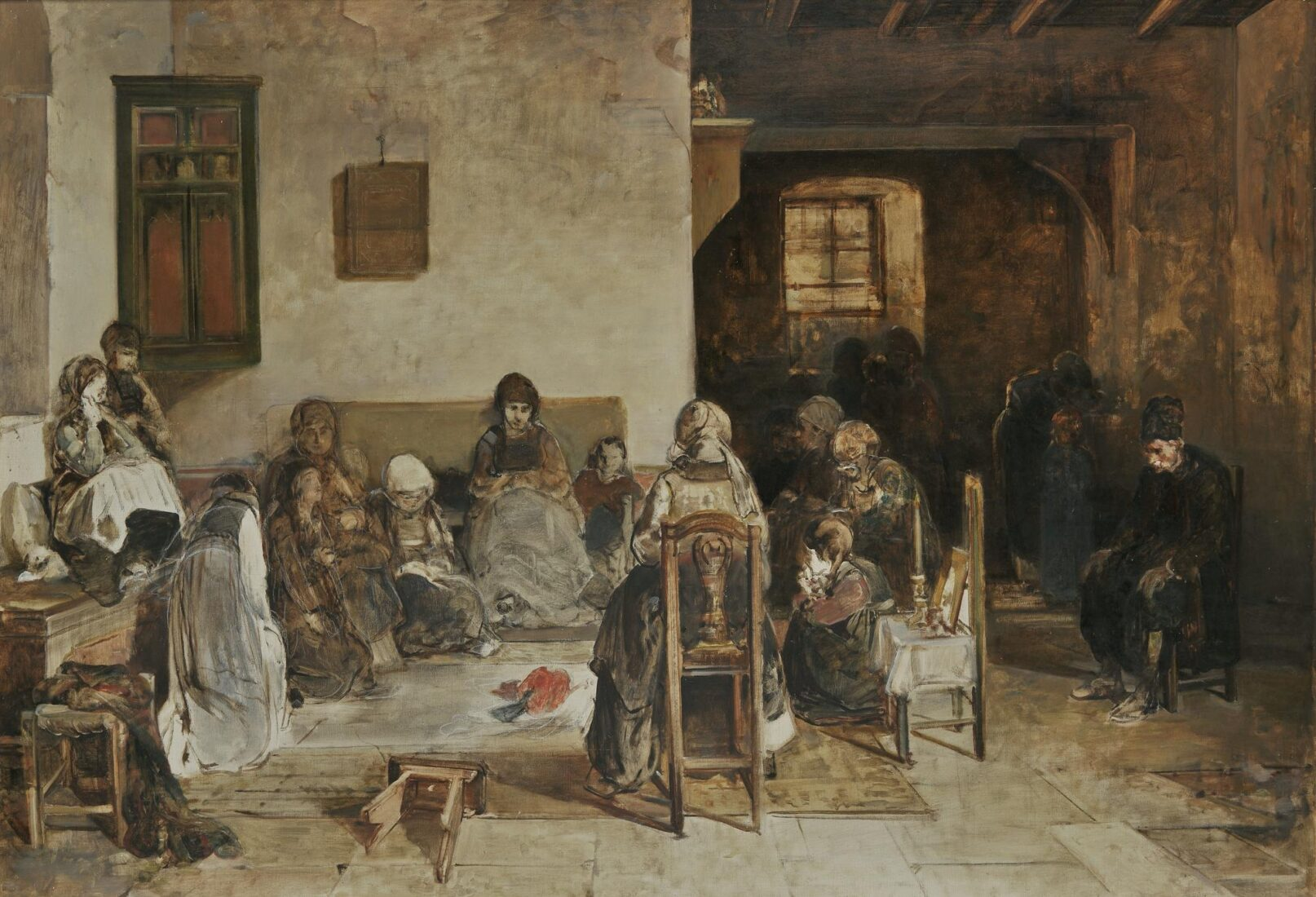
The Dirge in Psara (1888), National Gallery of Athens.
