= Electros Vekris =

American artist

Electros Vekris (born 1960), also known as Babis Vekris, is a Greek-born American artist renowned for incorporating LEDs (light-emitting diodes) that move in rhythmic motion and in sequence into his sculptures, installation art, and other artwork. He adopted the name Electros professionally in 1990.

== Biography ==
Born in Arcadia, Greece, Electros moved to New York City in 1979 and studied at the New York Studio School. In 1990, he began creating kinetic artwork with LEDs electronic components, black sintra board (PVC foam board), aluminum sheet, Fresnel lens, and stainless steel, assembling them into concepts of art generating light, sound and motion.

Established as an artist involved with art and technology, (Kinetics) .

Speaks English and Greek

== Interactive Installation Art (selected) ==
"The Binary Era," 1995

(3) "Electronic Rain," 1995

(4) "Scientific Remedy," 2007

(5) "Fractal Landscape II," 2007

== Exhibitions (Selected – partial listing) ==
2022 Hellenic Diaspora Foundation, Rio, Patra, Greece. Public Project installation of the "Intuitive Navigator".

2021 HAP Art Center, Queens College New York. "Cyber Symbols"

2019 Discovery Museum, Bridgeport CT, USA. "The Ocular Illusion in Art"

2017 Makedoniko Museum of Contemporary Art, Thessaloniki Greece, "The Binary Era". Displayed at the Permanent collection.

2015 Competition for Public Sculpture, Bridgeport Connecticut, USA. "Double DNA Helix" by the Municipality of the City of Bridgeport, CT.

2010-2015 Construction of the "Dome House". Architectural Sculpture prototype home, Norwalk Connecticut, USA.

2012 Corporate Commission, commissioned by RT, TV Station, "Boom Bust". Kinetic Animation Background for the broadcasting room.

2009 "Techno Rituals ", Thessaloniki Biennale 2, State Museum of Contemporary Art, Thessaloniki, Greece

2008 "Transmitted Frequencies", The Discovery Museum, Bridgeport, Connecticut, U.S.A.

2007 "Technology and Art Rituals", The Butler Institute of American Art, Youngstown, Ohio.

2005 "Art Works from 1983-1987", at Sani Resort Festival, Khalkidhiki, Greece.

2004 "Art Works from 1983–1987", Sani Festival, Cassandra Khalkidhiki, Greece

2001 Millennial Synergy, SCI+Art+Tech, Hunterdon Museum of Art, Clinton, N.J., U.S.

2000 "Time Timeless", Egon Schiele Art Centrum, Krumlov, Czech Republic

1999 "The Kinetic Spectrum", Museum Moderner Kunst, Passau, Germany

1998 Osaka Triennial, 9th International Art Competition, MYDOME, Osaka, Japan

1997 "Forces", Contemporary Art Museum of Virginia, Virginia Beach, Virginia, U.S.A.

1997 "Electros at the Project Room", Newark Museum, Newark, New Jersey, U.S.A.

1997 "Electros", Gazi Art Center, Athens, Greece

1995 "Art for the end of the 20th Century", Reading Public Museum, Reading, PA, U.S.A.

1995 ARTEC ’95, International Biennale, "The Binary Era," Installation, Nagoya City Science Museum, Nagoya, Japan

1995 "Less Green More Machine", ACP Galerie, Salzburg, Austria

1993 "The Binary Era", Museum Junge Kunst, Frankfurt (O), Germany

1992 "The Digital Series", Jansen-Perez Gallery, San Antonio, Texas, U.S.A.

1991 "The Digital Series", Museo del Chopo, Mexico City, Mexico

1990 " The Silicone Season", William Paterson Museum, Wayne, New Jersey, U.S.A.

1988 " WIthout Gravity", East Hampton Center for Contemporary Art, East Hampton, NY, US

1986 "Cosmotopia", Rosenberg & Kaufman Fine Arts, New York City

1984 "Luminal Objects", Kara Gallery, Geneva, Switzerland

1982 "The Nuclear Age", New York University, 80 Washington Square, East Gallery, New York City
