= Yiannis Melanitis =

Greek conceptual artist

Yiannis Melanitis (Greek: Γιάννης Μελανίτης) is a Greek conceptual artist, sculptor, painter, installation artist and digital artist born in Athens in 1967. In 2016, he was elected assistant professor at the Sculpture Department of the Athens School of Fine Arts. Melanitis' work uses hybrid art forms initially with concepts from philosophy and the sciences. His research focuses on the role of information on the arts considering "Information as the New Conceptualisation".

In 2016–2017 he presented at the TTT Conference a butterfly with his DNA inserted in it, Corfu, the Leda Melanitis Transgenic Butterfly, a new species containing his own gene concept. This transgenic butterfly was exhibited at MACRO Museum of Contemporary Arts, Rome. He has published essays on art and philosophy in English and Greek. His texts are translated into English, Italian, Korean, and Greek, and his work has become a subject of criticism in international editions such as "Art Tomorrow" (Ed.L.Smith), Leonardo, MIT, Lomonosov Moscow University by Seung-Chol Shin, Mario Savini, A.Kaniari, Magdalena Lange and others. Interviews and reviews of his work in online art magazines include Interalia Magazine, Postinerface, Artshake, and CLOT magazine. He was the organiser and one of the main exhibitors of an exhibition at the Andreas Syngros hospital in Athens with the subject: Dermatographies, Art meets Medicine. He was selected by the hospital to coordinate the exhibition and showcase his art because of his involvement and experience in exhibiting images of the modern human body, bioart and medical illustrations.

== Works and exhibitions ==
His latest works include the Leda Melanitis Transgenic butterfly (a genetically modified insect), Museu D. Diogo de Sousa, Braga, Portugal, Hunter of Light/ Hermes Tychomachos, Kryographia / Anatomy of Writing installation at Museu Nacional of Brasil, Hy-Brasil exhibition at Bibliothèque National Brasil, DE GEOMETRIE VAN RHETORIEK, at the Gallo Romeins Museum −2012, Belgium, the interactive performance installation and exhibition called Kryographia (The Conductivity of Writing), which presents writing as a metaphor for absolute coldness, in Athens, 14 October 2010. An extended form of the work Kryographia was presented at Kryographia/ On the Way Towards Iceland, Megaron, Thessaloniki Concert Hall (2011). Another conceptual exhibition was AN IMAGINARY MUSEUM OF AN IMAGINARY ARTIST /NAO ME TOQUE, Bibliothèque Nationale de Brasilia, (6 to 27 October 2011). Dans Le Jardin d’ Epicure / Les elements comme des metaphors, a personal exhibition at the University Hospital of Geneva, Switzerland, in March 2006. Also, Pleasure Machine which was performed at The Eighth New York Digital Salon in Madrid, and at the Blue Stage in the House of World Cultures in Berlin. Also Touch Terrain at the Monaco Dance Forum in Monaco, a multi-user interactive environment in 2006 and performance videos at Generative Arts, Milano, 2005. In March 2008, he installed a sculpture exhibition at E31 Gallery, Athens called Odysseus as Faust. At Depo Darm gallery, Athens, he exhibited works referring to the "conceptualisation at a minimum point" of an artwork, introducing probability through "artistic-math equations".

Texts about his work have been written several writers, including Mario Savini in several editions, by Assimina Kaniari, by M. Digoni, Rea Thönges-Striggari, Prof Dr Christa-Maria Lerm Hayes, Edward Lucie-Smith (Art Tomorrow), editions Terrail; First edition (October 2002)), N. Adamou, Sozita Goudouna text on Leda Melanitis at Posthuman New York, December 2019) and I. Maglinis. Melanitis exhibited at the first Biennale of Modern Art in Thessaloniki, organised by the State Museum of Modern Art of Greece. He was one of the artistic directors of an exhibition dedicated to Joseph Beuys in Greece. As an artist, Melanitis also exhibited his own art at the same exhibition. He exhibited his work at the Eugenides Foundation. He also exhibited at the second Performance Festival of Athens. Melanitis' works are also hosted in digital libraries in databases of visual art such as Gratin, and The Database of Virtual Art.

== Arts writer ==
Melanitis has written articles for the periodicals Artzine and Futura in both English and Greek. His text on Bioart was published in Τέχνη, πολιτισμός, παγκοσμιοποίηση., and also at the International Conference on Virtual Storytelling, ICVS, held in Avignon, France, in September 2001, (edited by Olivier Balet, Gérard Subsol, Patrice Torguet), ISBN 978-3-540-42611-0, editions Springer.
