= Demetrios Galanis =

Greek artist (1879–1966)

- Δημήτριος Γαλάνης
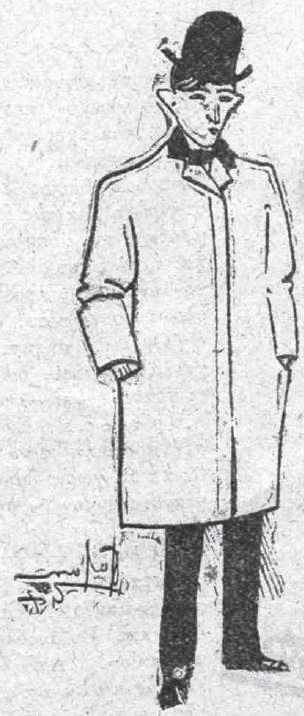
- Born: 17 May 1879; Athens, Kingdom of Greece
- Died: 20 March 1966 (aged 86); Paris, France
- Education: National Technical University of Athens; École des Beaux-Arts
- Known for: Painting, engraving, drawing, illustration, caricature
- Movement: Modernism
- Elected: Académie des Beaux-Arts (1945)
- Military career
- Allegiance: Kingdom of Greece; France
- Branch: French Army
- Unit: French Foreign Legion
- Conflicts: World War I

Demetrios Galanis (Greek: Δημήτριος Γαλάνης, 17 May 1879, Athens – 20 March 1966, Paris) was an early twentieth-century Greek artist and friend of Pablo Picasso. In 1920, the year he completed his Seated Nude (private collection), he exhibited alongside such major figures of modern art as Matisse and Braque, while from 1921 on he also exhibited alongside Juan Gris, Dufy, Chagall, and Picasso.

He served in the French Foreign Legion during World War I. By the early 1920s Galanis acquired French citizenship and became famous in France, while preparing for shows in Brussels, London, and New York. In 1920–21 he frequently exhibited in Paris and in 1922 his first one-man exhibition received the enthusiastic critical response that established his reputation. Seated Nude was among the pictures exhibited, and in an introduction to the exhibition André Malraux described the artist's work as "having the power to stir emotions equivalent to that of Giotto."

This show established Galanis's reputation as a painter and confirmed the favourable opinions already expressed on the quality of his work. Critics of his time paid much more attention to his figurative work than his landscapes, confirming the well-established view that Galanis's first and foremost concern was his love for the human form.

Galanis received greater critical acclaim abroad in his lifetime than any other Greek modern artist of the early 20th century. The French state honoured him with the highest distinctions: full professor at the École des Beaux Arts in Paris and a lifelong member of the Académie française.

Having moved to Paris in 1900, living in Montmartre for fifty years in a house which is now the Musée de Montmartre, Galanis developed his artistic talent beyond painting. He was also known for his illustrative wood-engravings in books, such as the Limited Editions Club of Sophocles' Oedipus the King and the Cresset Press edition of John Milton's Paradise Lost. The Limited Editions Club published 1500 signed copies in 1955 and the sister organization, Heritage Press, then reprinted unsigned volumes.

The most significant collection of Galanis's work is held in the Teloglion Foundation at the Aristotle University of Thessaloniki, although examples can also be found in London's Tate Gallery. His famous Seated Nude sold at auction for $221,860 in May 2006.

Sources 1.Galanis. "EI" Magazine of European Art Center (EUARCE) of Greece, 13st issue 1996, p. 14&30–31 (The strong ties of friendship that bound poet Yannis Koutsoheras are vividly described in an old text by the former, published in this issue for the first time)
