= Gregorios Zevgolis =

Greek painter and sculptor (1886–1950)

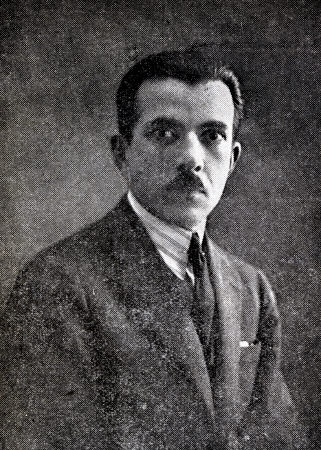
- Born: 1886; Athens, Greece
- Died: 20 February 1950 (aged 63–64); Athens, Greece
- Education: Athens School of Fine Arts; Académie Julian; Beaux-Arts de Paris
- Occupation(s): sculptor, painter
- Notable work: Statue of Liberty in Mytilene

Gregorios Zevgolis (Greek: Γρηγόριος Ζευγώλης; Athens, 1886 – Athens, 20 February 1950) was a Greek sculptor and painter, originating from Naxos.

== Biography ==
He studied from 1903 to 1908 at the Higher School of Fine Arts of Athens with teachers Nikiforos Lytras in painting and Georgios Vroutos in sculpture. He continued his studies at the Académie Julian at Paul Landowski's side and the École Supérieure des Beaux-Arts in Paris.

In 1911, on his return to Athens, he opened a workshop with Nikolaos Lytras at 21 Epirou Street, near the National Archaeological Museum of Greece. Along with the latter, he was one of the founding members of the Art Group. He participated in various group exhibitions such as the Association of Greek Artists and the Art Group (1917). He was a member of the Chamber of Fine Arts of Greece.

== Works ==
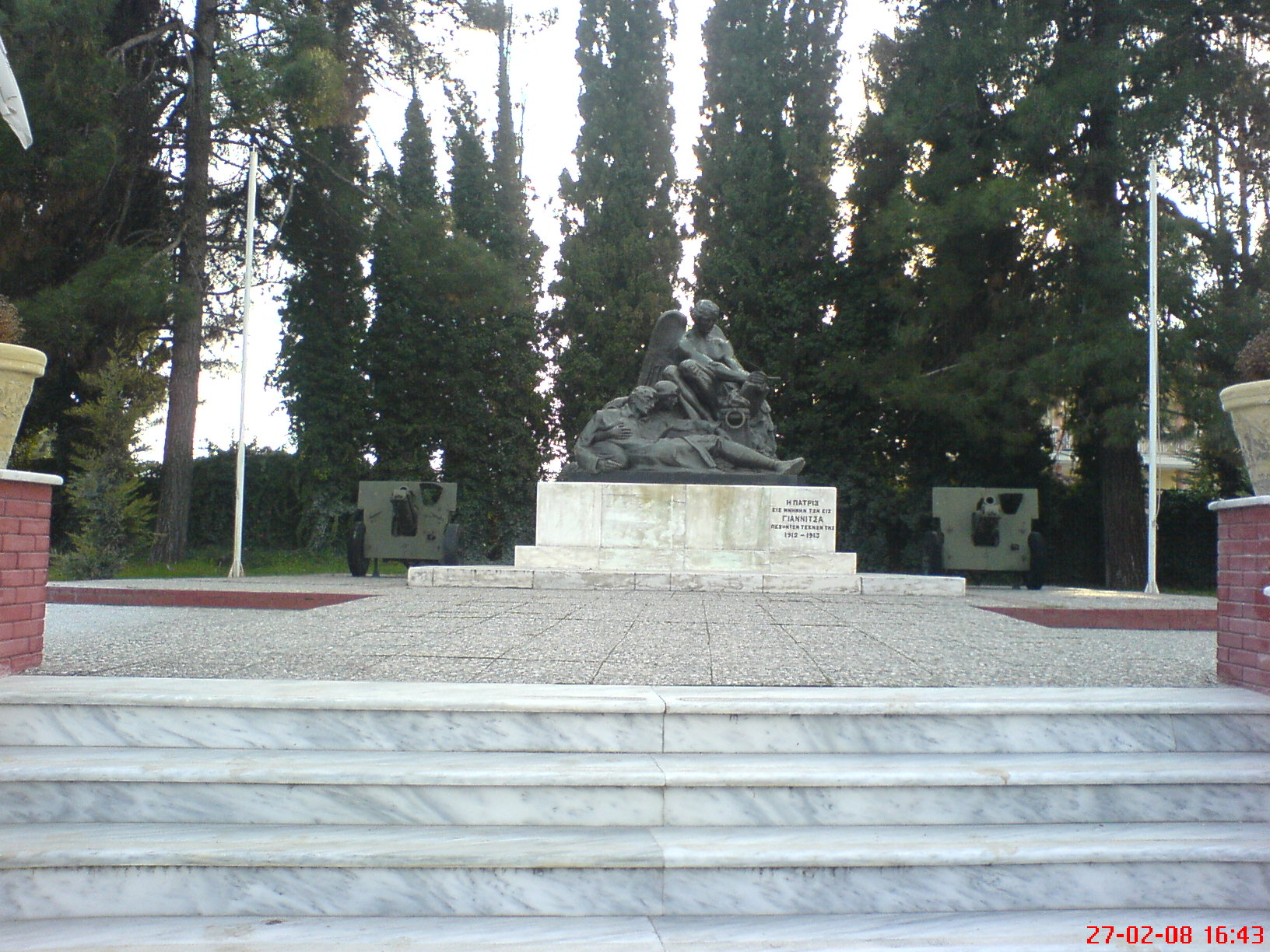
Composition of the victims of the Balkan wars, Giannitsa.

Zevgolis was deeply influenced by Auguste Rodin's sculpture and the contemporary artistic currents that prevailed during his studies in the French capital. As noted by Stelios Lydakis, Zevgolis is one of the most prominent representatives of Rodin and post-Rodin sculpture in Greece, which uses data from Rodin sculpture with symbolic realism.

Zevgolis was one of the most productive Greek sculptors of the interwar period. Among others, he painted the Heroes of Keratea (1916), Mytilene (1919) and Giannitsa (1925). Also, as a representative of outdoor sculpture, he made the busts of "Nikitaras" (1937), from marble, in Pedion tou Areos in Athens, of artist "Pericles of Byzantion" on Diogenous Street in Plaka, by the poet Lambros Porphyras in Chios, Aspasia Manos and more.

One of Zevgolis' most prominent works is the "Eva" nude marble bodysuit, which has been erected since 1995 at the site now located in Nikolopoulou Square (formerly Rostan Square) in the Kypriadou district of Ano Patisia, Athens.

Another well-known work is the Statue of Liberty in Mytilene.

Zevgolis presented his work in solo exhibitions (Athens, 1919), while he took part in pan-Hellenic and group exhibitions of the Association of Greek Artists (1915, 1917).

=== Black Statue of Giannitsa ===
The "Black Statue", as it was established to be called, is the Hero of the city of Giannitsa, a work by the sculptor Grigorios Zevgolis that was placed there in 1926 in memory of the warriors who gave their lives for the liberation of the city from the Ottomans during the Balkan Wars of 1912–1913. This statue represents the Winged Time, and at his feet the mother Greece, having embraced her son, a killed soldier. It is located at the eastern entrance of the city by Egnatia Street (at coordinates 40.780680°N 22.415°E).

== Sources ==
- Στέλιος Λυδάκης: "Οι Έλληνες Γλύπτες: H νεοελληνική γλυπτική, ιστορία – τυπολογία – λεξικό γλυπτών", τόμ. 5ος, σελ. 322, Εκδοτικός οίκος "ΜΕΛΙΣΣΑ", Αθήνα. 1981.
- Ζέττα Αντωνοπούλου: "Τα γλυπτά της Αθήνας: Υπαίθρια γλυπτική 1834 – 2004", σελ. 47, 71, 97 & 104, α΄ έκδοση, Εκδόσεις "Ποταμός", Αθήνα, 2003.
- Εγκυκλοπαίδεια Πάπυρος-Λαρούς-Μπριτάνικα, λήμμα "Ζευγώλης, Γρηγόριος", τόμ. 26, σελ. 33, Εκδόσεις Πάπυρος, Αθήνα, 1996.
- Ανώνυμος, «Καλλιτεχνικαί εκθέσεις. Λύτρα-Ζευγώλη», Πινακοθήκη, έτος ΙΘ΄, τ. 228, Φεβρουάριος 1920, σ. 106–107 (http://pleias.lis.upatras.gr/index.php/pinakothiki/article/view/34722/34703) (30 April 2015)
- Αντωνία Γιαννουδάκη, Εθνική Πινακοθήκη και Μουσείο Αλεξάνδρου Σούτζου, Ίδρυμα Ευριπίδη Κουτλίδη. Η συλλογή νεοελληνικής γλυπτικής και η ιστορία της 1900–2006 (διδακτορική διατριβή), Αριστοτέλειο Πανεπιστήμιο Θεσσαλονίκης, Τμήμα Ιστορίας και Αρχαιολογίας, Τομέας Ιστορίας της Τέχνης, Θεσσαλονίκη 2009 (http://ikee.lib.auth.gr/record/115849) (7/5/2015)
- Θ.Δ., «Το έργο του Γρηγόρη Ζευγώλη», Εικόνες, 29 Ιουλίου 1960, σ. 62–63
- Δ. Καλλονάς, «Γρηγόριος Ζευγώλης: Ο γλύπτης που έχει αηδιάσει τον κόσμον και τον … εαυτόν του!», Βραδυνή, 26 Ιανουαρίου 1935
- Λεξικό Ελλήνων Καλλιτεχνών. Ζωγράφοι – Γλύπτες – Χαράκτες, 16^{ος}-20ός αιώνας, επιστημονική επιμέλεια Ευγένιος Δ. Ματθιόπουλος, τόμ. 2, Μέλισσα, Αθήνα 1997–2000
- Στέλιος Λυδάκης, Οι έλληνες γλύπτες. Η νεοελληνική γλυπτική. Ιστορία-τυπολογία-λεξικό γλυπτών, τόμ. 5, Μέλισσα, Αθήνα 1981
- Στέλιος Λυδάκης, Η νεοελληνική γλυπτική. Ιστορία, τυπολογία, Μέλισσα, Αθήνα, 2011
- Ελένη Μάργαρη, Η γυναίκα στη νεοελληνική γλυπτική, Ιωάννινα 2014
- Ηλίας Μυκονιάτης, Νεοελληνική γλυπτική, στη σειρά Ελληνική τέχνη, Εκδοτική Αθηνών, Αθήνα 1996
- Kathérina Perpinioti-Agazir, Le “Groupe Tekhni”, τόμ. I-VII (διδακτορική διατριβή), Université Paris I – Panthéon-Sorbonne, U.F.R. Histoire de l’art et archéologie, [2002]
- Φιλότεχνος, «Ο ζωγράφος κ. Ν. Λύτρας και ο γλύπτης κ. Γρ. Ζευγώλης», Η Κυριακή του Ελεύθερου Βήματος, 6 Φεβρουαρίου 1927
- Χρύσανθος Χρήστου – Μυρτώ Κουμβακάλη-Αναστασιάδη, Νεοελληνική γλυπτική 1800–1940, έκδοση Εμπορικής Τραπέζης της Ελλάδος, Αθήνα 1982
