= Straw hat (disambiguation) =

A straw hat is a brimmed hat that is woven out of straw or straw-like materials.

Straw Hat may also refer to:

- Straw Hats, the main protagonist of One Piece
  - Monkey D. Luffy, or "Straw Hat" Luffy, main protagonist of One Piece
- The Straw Hat, portrait of Susanna Lunden, a painting by Peter Paul Rubens
- The Straw Hat (Lytras), a 1925 oil painting by Nikolaos Lytras
- Straw Hat Pizza, a chain of pizza restaurants founded in 1959 in San Leandro, California
- Straw Hat (film), a 1971 Czechoslovak comedy film
- The Straw Hat, a 1974 Soviet musical comedy television film

== See also ==
- Balibuntal hat, a traditional straw hat from the Philippines
- Un Chapeau de Paille d'Italie (disambiguation)
