= Nikolaos Alektoridis =

Greek painter

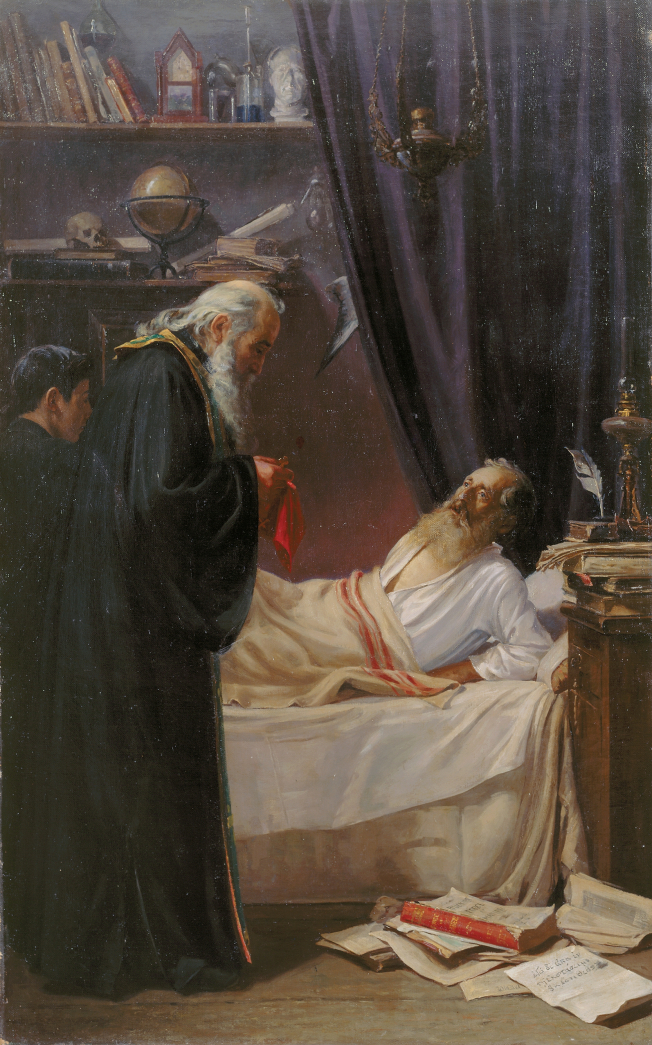
The death of an atheist, 1906 painting by Alektoridis.

Nikolaos Alektoridis (Greek: Νικόλαος Αλεκτορίδης; 1874–1909) was a Greek painter and a member of the Munich School of Greek artists.

== Biography ==
He was born in Kayseri (then part of the Ottoman Empire) in 1874. He studied in Constantinople under the Italian painter Fausto Zonaro. After the end of his studies he settled to Athens, where he worked as an icon painter. In 1903 Alektoridis created along with Vasileios Hatzis an art studio in which painters like George Bouzianis and Periklis Vyzantios attended classes. Alektoridis participated at the Athens International Exhibition (1907, 1908, and 1909), at the 1902 Art Exhibition of Constantinople, at the 1907 International Maritime Exhibition in Bordeaux (where he won a gold medal) and at the exhibition of the Greek Art Society in Cairo (1909).

Alektoridis drowned at Vouliagmeni, on 12 July 1909 after entering the sea without knowing swimming.

== Work ==
Alektoridis subjects were mostly portraits, mythological compositions with religious content and genre painting. His art was heavy influenced by the academic tone of Munich School.
