= Lytras =

Lytras is a Greek surname. Notable people with the surname include:

- Nikiforos Lytras (1832–1904), Greek painter
- Nikolaos Lytras (1883–1927), Greek painter
- Orfeas Lytras (born 1998), Greek footballer
