= Municipal Art Gallery of Ioannina =

- Δημοτική Πινακοθήκη Ιωαννίνων
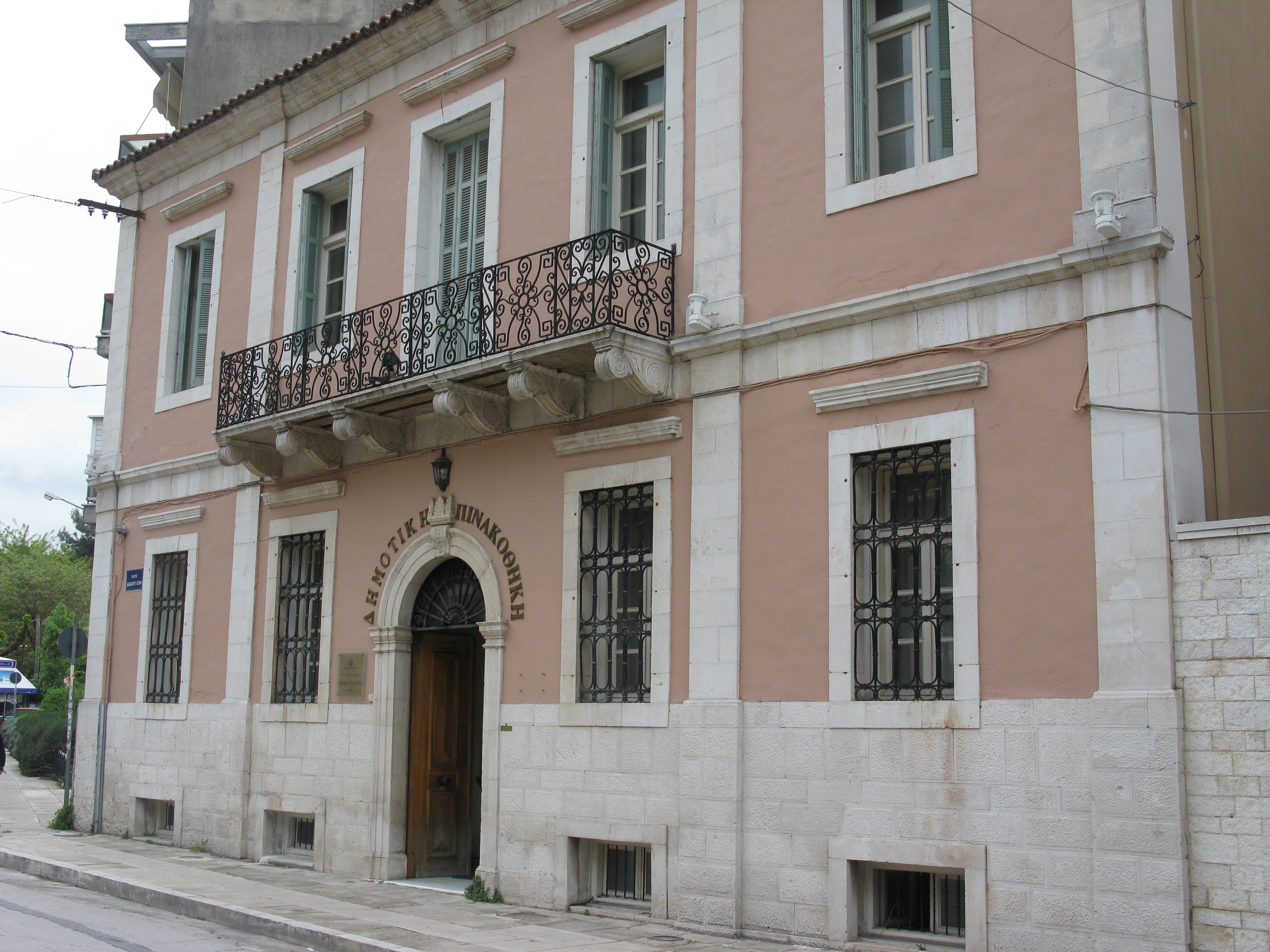

- Location within Greece
- Established: 20 February 2000
- Location: Koraï 1, Ioannina, Greece
- Coordinates: 39.669011°N 20.850036°E
- Type: Art gallery
- Website: 84.205.237.184/pinakothiki/

The Municipal Art Gallery of Ioannina (Greek: Δημοτική Πινακοθήκη Ιωαννίνων) is an art museum in Ioannina, Greece that has been open in its current building since 2000. The collection of over 500 items ranges from classical to modern paintings and sculptures.

== Location ==
Since 2000 the gallery has been housed in the Pyrsinella Mansion at 1 Korai Street & 28 October Street in Ioannina. This is a neoclassical building dating to around 1890. Neoclassical elements include the lintels, balcony corbels and window frames. It was built by the engineer Vergoti for the bibliophile and art lover Basil Pyrsinella, who was mayor of the town for many years in the 1920s and 1930s. He left all his fixed and movable property to the municipality in 1958.

== History ==
The gallery first opened in 1960 in the Mela building, and was the first regional municipal gallery in Greece. The collection grew in part through purchase but mostly through donations from collectors and artists. In 1965 the gallery was closed due to housing problems, but part of the collection was housed in the Archaeological Museum of Ioannina. The gallery was reopened on 20 February 2000 in the Pyrsinella Mansion.

== Collection ==
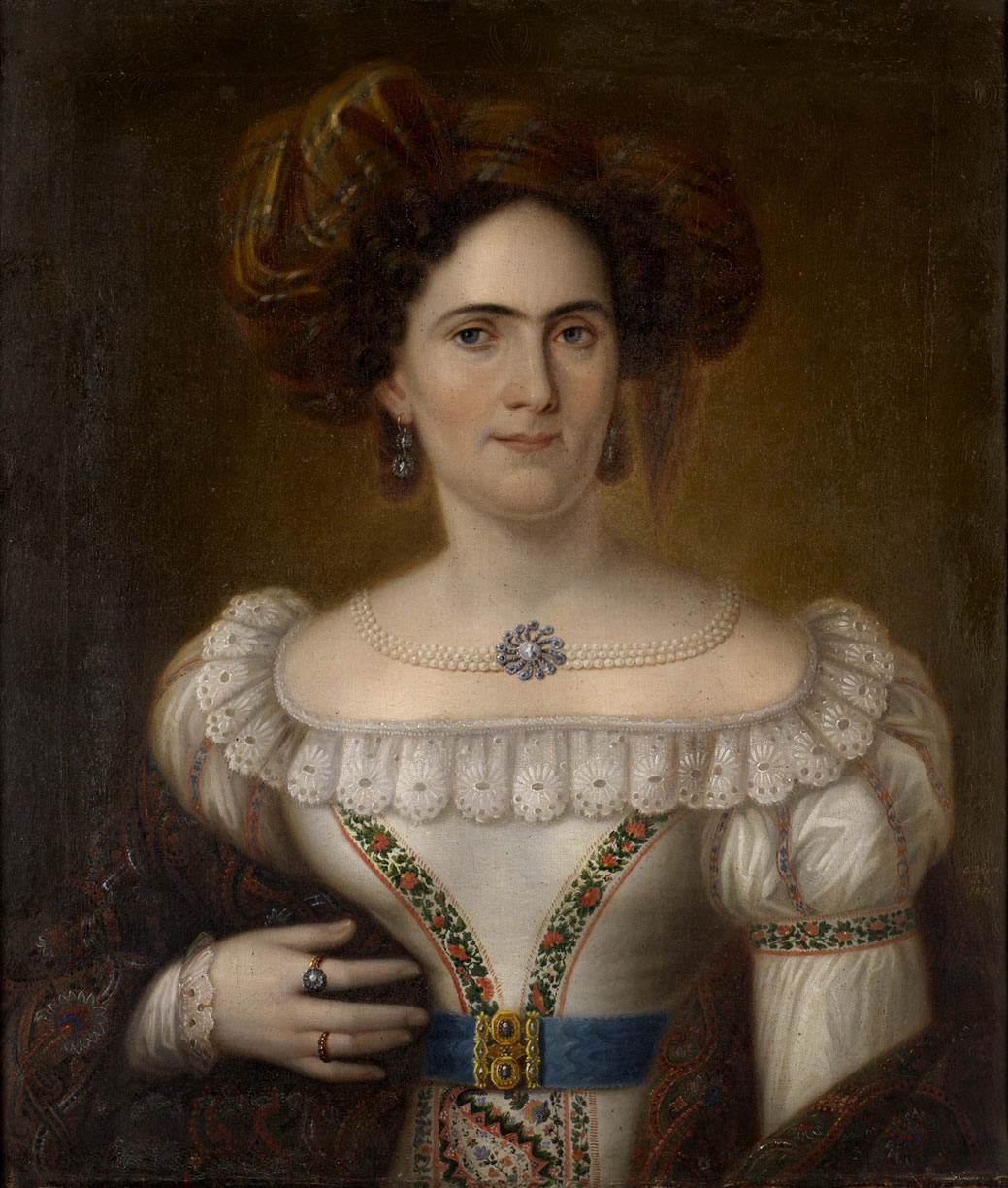
Dionysios Vegias (1820–84) Portrait of a woman (1870)

The gallery has a permanent collection of about 500 works of art by Greek artists, including paintings, prints and sculptures. The pictures range from the pyrrhonist academic style of the Munich School through impressionism and humanism to modern Greek art. Artists include Nikolaos Gyzis, Georgios Jakobides, Spyridon Vikatos, Sophia Laskaridou, Georgios Roilos, Thalia Flora-Karavia, Konstantinos Parthenis, Konstantinos Maleas, Nikiforos Lytras, Demetrios Galanis, Yannis Tsarouchis, Spyros Vassiliou, Giorgios Gounaropoulos, George Bouzianis, Panayiotis Tetsis, Alekos Fassianos, Aglaia Papa, Demetrios Galanis, Vaso Katraki, Michael Tombros, Theodoros Papagiannis and Athanase Apartis.

== Events ==
The gallery frequently stages temporary exhibitions and events. In October 2011 the gallery hosted an exhibition of the work of Epirus photographer Kostas Balafas. In February 2012 "The Sound of Austria" presented works of Joachim Lothar Gartner, Christian Eder, Lui Janele and Thomas Kröswang. In October 2015 the museum organized an exhibition to introduce school children to the causes, effects and consequences of the wave of refugees. The exhibits of painting, sculpture and photography, explained by five actors, introduced children to the experience and feelings of the refugees and encouraged them to empathize with them.

On 23 November 2015 "Art 31" opened, a group exhibition of the Epirus Association of Graduates of Higher Schools of Fine Arts. Dimitris Giotitsas, president of the Constantine Cultural Center, said that in the present adverse environment artists could unite behind the slogan ""culture against the crisis." An exhibition named "Touched Art" opened on 18 January 2016, arranged with students of the Fine Arts School, University of Ioannina. Unlike most art exhibitions it invited visitors, whether sighted or not, to explore the works through touch. University students gave tactile guided tours and taught about artistic creation with regard to blindness and visual impairment.

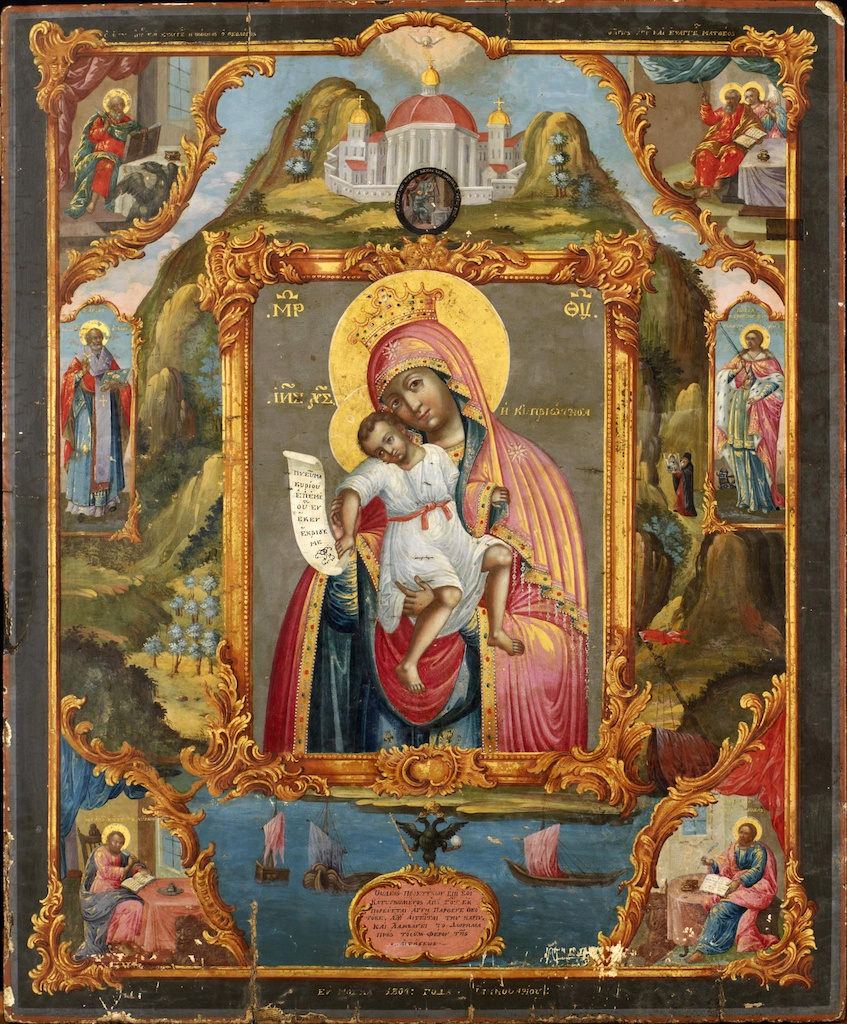
Virgin and Child with Evangelists (1804, unknown artist)

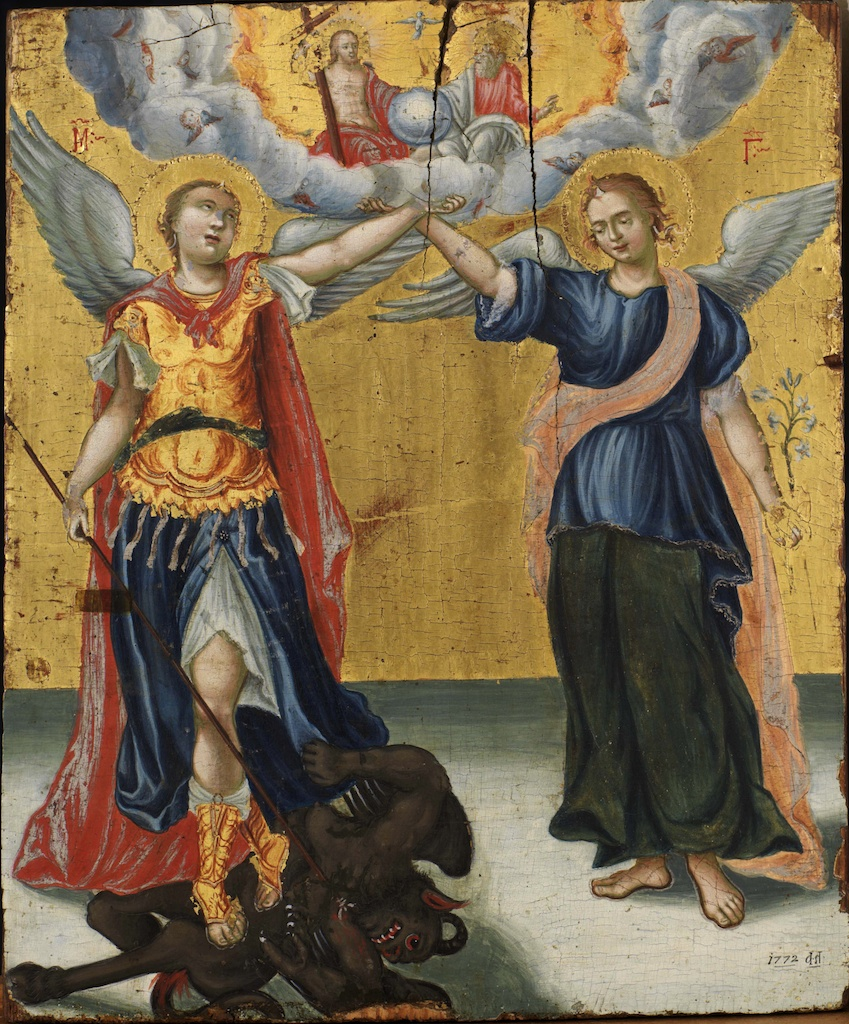
"Archangels Michael and Gabriel" (1772)

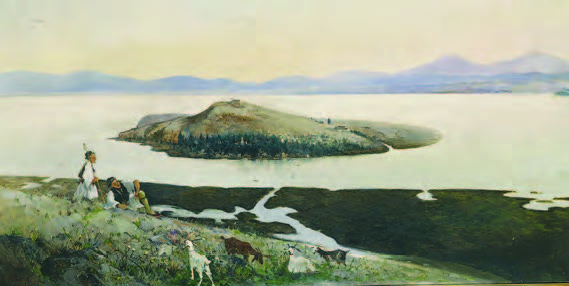
Vassileios Chatzis The island of Pamvotis (1898)

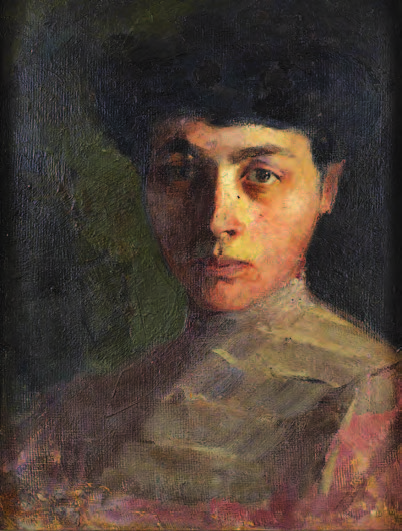
Nikolaos Lytras Marika Apostolou (1906)

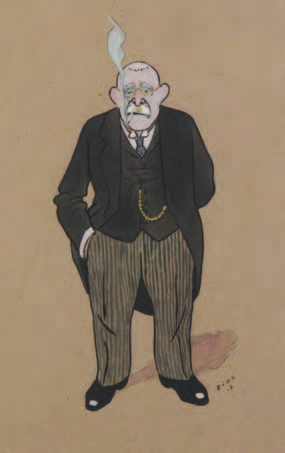
Ali Dino Caricature (1917

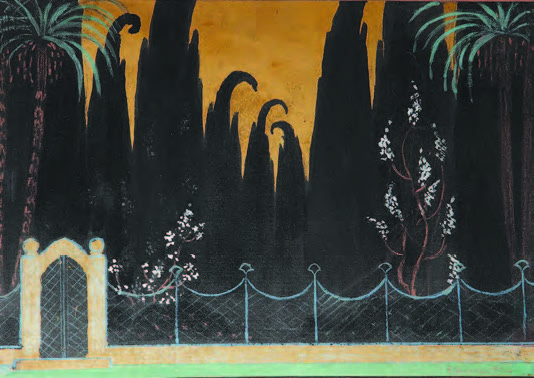
Panos Aravantinos Model for 1st act of Oberon by Carl Maria von Weber (1922)

== Sources ==
- "Άγγιξε την Τέχνη στη Δημοτική Πινακοθήκη Ιωαννίνων", ioannina2012 (in Greek), 2016-01-19
- Δημοτική Πινακοθήκη (in Greek), Municipality of Ioannina
- Εικαστική Έκθεση και απτικές μουσειοπαιδαγωγικές δράσεις στη Δημοτική Πινακοθήκη Ιωαννίνων (18-24 Ιανουαρίου 2016) (in Greek), 15 January 2016
- "Έκθεση στη Δημοτική Πινακοθήκη Ιωαννίνων", Epirus News (in Greek), 2013-09-09
- Ελένη Ζήκου; Παναγιώτα Παππά; Μαρία Πετρίδου (2015-12-13), Αν έφευγα κι εγώ: Η Β΄τάξη του σχολείου μας στη Δημοτική Πινακοθήκη (in Greek), Πρότυπο Πειραματικό Γυμνάσιο Ζωσιμαίας Σχολής
- Lucia Tzalla (26 November 2015), "Στη Δημοτική Πινακοθήκη", Ηπειρωτικός Αγών (in Greek)
- "Μουσειοπαιδαγωγικές δράσεις στη Δημοτική Πινακοθήκη Ιωαννίνων", Epirus Online (in Greek), 27 October 2015
- "Municipal Art Gallery of Ioannina", Ioannina Epirus GreeceTourist Guide
- "Municipal Art Gallery of Ioannina", gtp, International Publications Ltd.
- "Municipal Art Gallery", wondergreece.gr
