= Athanase Apartis =

Greek sculptor

- Αθανάσιος/Θανάσης Απάρτης
- Born: 24 October 1899; Smyrna, Asia Minor
- Died: 1 April 1972 (aged 72); Athens, Greece
- Occupation: Sculptor

Athanase Apartis (Greek: Αθανάσιος Απάρτης, 24 October 1899 – 1 April 1972) was a Greek sculptor. His busts of famous people and monumental works stand in many public places in Greece.

== Life ==
Athanase Apartis was born on 24 October 1899 in Smyrna, Asia Minor, son of a tailor who had six children. He often worked in the studio of Papazian, an Armenian sculptor who had studied in Rome and Venice. He was given lessons by the painter Vasilis Ithakisios. He moved to Paris in 1919, and began to study at the Académie Julian. In October 1919 he was admitted to the École des Beaux Arts, but stayed there only two months before returning to the Academie Julian, where he studied for two years with Paul Landowski and Henri Bouchard.

Apartis showed three works in the Salon d'Automne in 1921. There he met Antoine Bourdelle and decided to transfer from the Academie Julian to the Grande Chaumière, where he studied for four years before leaving in 1925 without graduating. Bourdelle gave Apartis much help in his career, and arranged for his work to be shown in 1923 at the Salon des Tuileries. Apartis began to obtain commissions in the 1920s, and made several busts of prominent people. Helena Venizelos provided a small grant that let him live in Paris until 1940, with short return visits to Greece. In 1939 he was made a Chevalier of the Legion of Honour. He exhibited at the Petit Palais and the Jeu de Paume. His Woman and Child was bought by the French government, and he was asked to make a sculpture of Adonis by the Greek government.

During World War II (1939–45) Apartis returned to Greece in 1940 and remained there working during the German occupation. After the war he lived in turn in Athens and Paris, finally returning to Greece in 1956. He was appointed professor of drawing at the Technological Educational Institute of Athens in 1959. In 1961 he was made a professor of sculpture at the Athens School of Fine Arts. He taught there until 1969. He died on 1 April 1972 at the age of 72.

== Work ==
Apartis was influenced by the antique sculpture in the Louvre and by the work of Auguste Rodin. Antoine Bourdelle had a major influence on his work. While in Paris before the war he often exhibited at the Salon d'Automne, Salon des Tuileries and Salon des Indépendants, and gave exhibitions at his studio. Later he exhibited in the Venice Biennale (1950) and São Paulo (1961). In 1984 his work was exhibited in a retrospective at the National Gallery of Greece. The Municipal Art Gallery of Ioannina holds some of his work. His monumental works and busts of famous people ornament many public places in Greece.

Busts of prominent people include:

- Ioannis Psycharis (1927)
- Odysseas Androutsos (1936), marble bust, Athens – Pedion tou Areos.
- Nikos Kazantzakis, brass bust, Athens – Perivolos Cultural Centre of Athens. The bust was stolen in March 2013.
- Angelos Sikelianos (1955), brass bust, Athens – Skouze Square.
- Dimitri Mitropoulos, brass bust, Athens – Courtyard Athens Conservatory.

His monumental works include:

- The smile of Athens, Bank of Greece
- Silent Sailor, Captain, Chios
- Andreas Laskaratos Kefalonia
- Chrysostomos Smyrnis statue, Nea Smyrni
- Chrysostomos Smyrnis statue, Agias Sofias Square, Thessaloniki (1960)
- Maria Teresa, National Bank of Greece (1937)
- Teenager (1940)
- Mother and Daughter (plaster, 1952)
- Bitch (brass, 1955), Athens – National Gallery

== Publications ==
- Athanase Apartis (1962), Apo tēn Anatolē stē Dusē (From East to West), Ellēnikē pezografia, vol. 26, Autobiography, Gnōsē, p. 242

== Sources ==
- Απάρτης Θανάσης (in Greek), National Gallery of Greece, archived from the original on 4 March 2016
- "Athanase APARTIS(1899–1972)", Galerie Malaquais (in French), archived from the original on 12 October 2016
- Apartis Thanassis (1899–1972), ISET: contemporary greek art institute
- Δημοτική Πινακοθήκη (in Greek), Municipality of Ioannina, archived from the original on 18 September 2015
