= Italian Straw Hat =

Italian straw hat may refer to:

- Un Chapeau de Paille d'Italie, an Italian play adapted into two films
- Buntal hat, a straw hat from the Philippines also known as the "Italian straw hat"
