= Panos Aravantinos Decor Museum =

Museum in Piraeus, Greece

Panos Aravantinos Decor Museum is a museum in Piraeus, Athens, Greece. The museum was named after Panos Aravantinos, a famous Greek and German opera scenic, costume designer and decorator. The museum is in the building of Municipal theater of Piraeus and there are about 1300 works of Panos Aravantinos.
