= Vasileios Hatzis =

Greek painter

- Βασίλειος Χατζής
- Vasileios Hatzis by George Bouzianis (1913)
- Born: 1870; Kastoria, Greece
- Died: 1915; Athens, Greece
- Occupation: Painter
- Known for: Seascapes

Vasileios Hatzis or Vassileios Chatzis (Greek: Βασίλειος Χατζής, 1870 – 1915) was a Greek painter best known for his seascapes.

== Life ==
Vasileios Hatzis was born in 1870 in Kastoria to a family involved in shipping; he spent his childhood in Patras. From 1886 to 1893 he studied at the Athens School of Fine Arts under Nikiforos Lytras and Konstantinos Volanakis. He served with the Greek fleet during the Balkan Wars of 1912–13. He died in Athens in 1915.

== Work ==
While known primarily for his seascapes, Hatzis also painted landscapes and scenes from the lives of farmers and fishermen. He painted in both academic and en plein air styles, and the influence of impressionism may be detected in his work. He first exhibited in Athens in 1899, and his paintings appeared in group exhibitions in Athens (1902, 1907, 1909, 1910) and Alexandria (1903, 1906). Shortly after his death, a solo exhibition of over 260 of his works was held at the Zappeion hall in Athens.

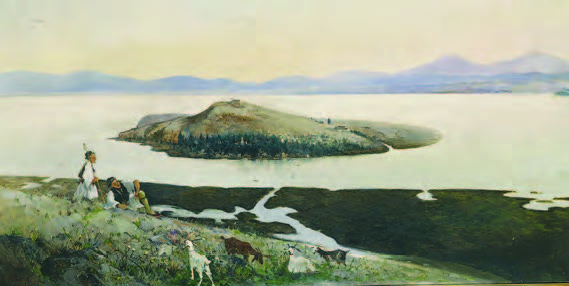
The island of Pamvotis (1898) Municipal Art Gallery of Ioannina

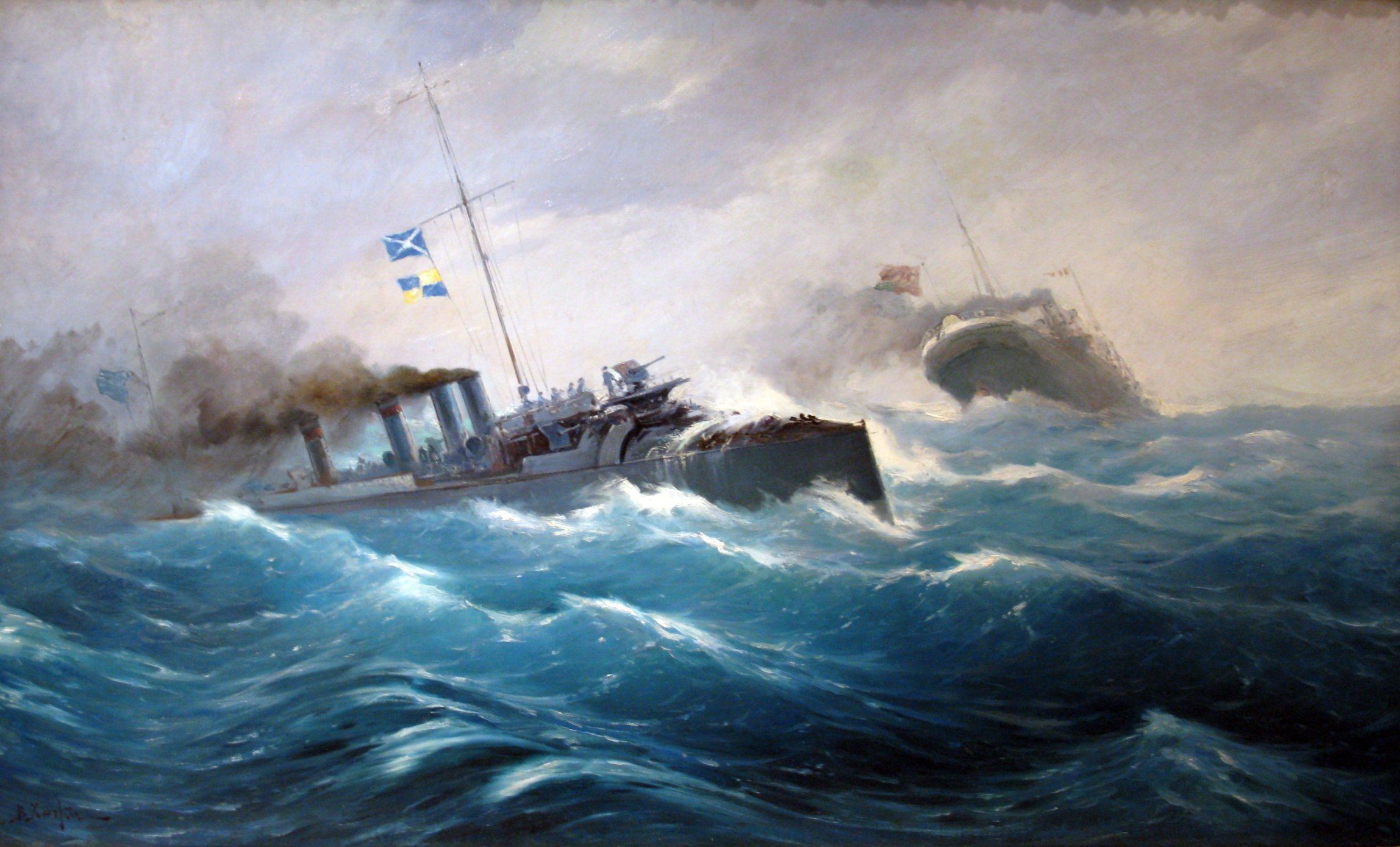
Ship Inspection

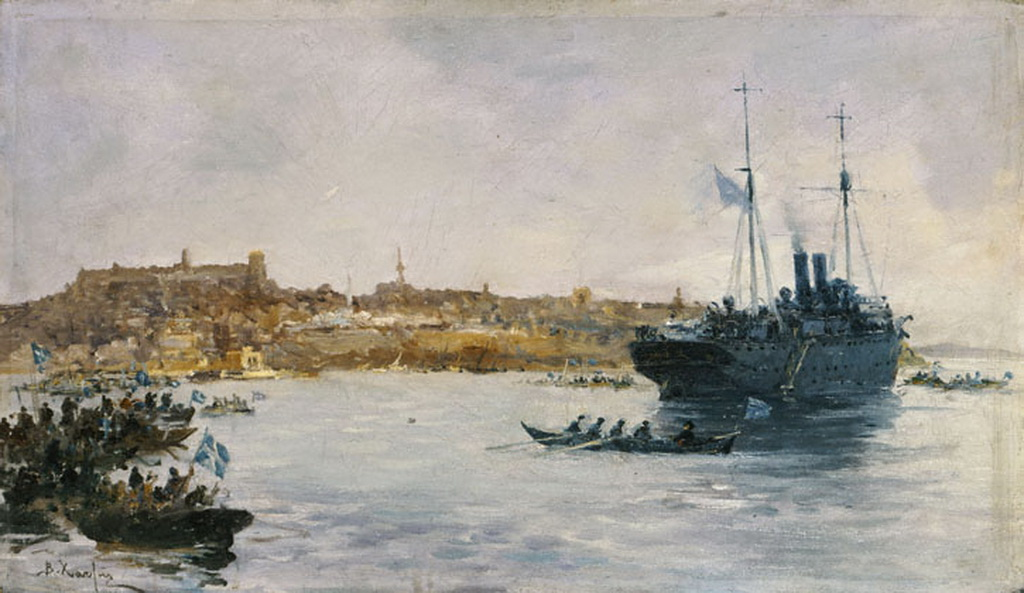
Landing of Greek troops in Kavala (1913)

== Sources ==
- Βενετία (in Greek), A. G. Leventis Gallery
- Χατζής Βασίλειος (in Greek), National Gallery of Greece
- "Exhibition about Sea in Greek Painting", greeka.com, 22 October 2014
