= Theodoros Papagiannis =

Greek sculptor

- Θεόδωρος Παπαγιάννης
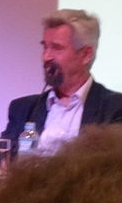
- Born: 1942 (age 83–84); Elliniko, Greece
- Occupation: Sculptor

Theodoros Papagiannis (Greek: Θεόδωρος Παπαγιάννης, born 1942) is a Greek sculptor. His work is held by many collections and stands in public places in Greece and elsewhere, including his sculpture "The Runners" at O'Hare International Airport in Chicago.

== Life ==
Theodoros Papagiannis was born in 1942 in Elliniko, Ioannina, Greece. He obtained a scholarship that let him study under Yannis Pappas from 1961 to 1966 at the Athens School of Fine Arts. In 1967 he was given a state scholarship to study Ancient Greek Art in Greece, Egypt, Turkey, Cyprus, Sicily and Southern Italy. Papagiannis became assistant professor at the School of Fine Arts in 1970, supporting Yannis Pappas as professor. He was one of the organizers of the Center for Visual Arts (KET) in 1974. He studied the latest materials and techniques at the École nationale supérieure des arts appliqués et des métiers d'art in Paris in 1981–82. In 1987 he was elected associate professor in the School of Fine Arts.

Papagiannis organized various sculpture symposiums in cities of Greece and Cyprus, where large sculptures were created in public spaces. Through the Erasmus Programme he cooperated with many European Fine Arts schools, particularly the Academy of Arts, Berlin and Brera Academy, Milan. After retiring, in 2009 Papagiannis founded the Theodoros Papayannis Museum of Contemporary Art in a former school in his home town of Elliniko. Every summer students and sculptors are invited to the museum to create sculptures, which are placed on the 5 kilometres (3.1 mi) route from the village to the Monastery of Tsouka. As of 2016 he was Professor Emeritus of Sculpture in the School of Fine Arts and Professor Emeritus at the University of Ioannina in the Department of Plastic Arts.

== Work ==
Papagiannis has exhibited his work in 30 solo exhibitions and in many group exhibitions in Greece and in other countries. His work includes busts and statues of prominent personalities, medals, coins and large sculptural compositions. His sculptures stand in many public places in Greece and abroad, and are held in public and private collections of museums and galleries like the National Gallery of Greece, the North Museum, National Sculpture Gallery, Presidential Palace, Pierides Gallery, Thessaloniki Museum, Gallery of the National Bank Cultural Foundation, Rhodes Municipal Gallery, Municipal Gallery of Patras, Florina Art Gallery, Averoff Gallery in Metsovo and Kouvoutsaki Gallery in Kifissia. The Municipal Art Gallery of Ioannina has examples of his work.

Papagiannis won an international sculpture composition sponsored by the City of Chicago in 2006 for his sculpture "The Runners", which was installed at O'Hare International Airport in April 2011. The sculpture is 16 feet (4.9 m) high and 40 feet (12 m) long, and consists of ten individual statues of runners cut from stainless steel about 2.25 inches (57 mm) thick.

== Sources ==
- Δημοτική Πινακοθήκη (in Greek), Municipality of Ioannina
- "Έκθεση Γλυπτικής "Η Πομπή" του διεθνούς φήμης Ηπειρώτη καλλιτέχνη, Θεόδωρου Παπαγιάννη", Star.gr (in Greek), 19 November 2012
- Jyoti Srivastava (2011), "THE RUNNERS – BY THEODOROS PAPAGIANNIS", Public Art in Chicago
- "Theodoros Papagiannis", Artia Gallery
- ""Θεόδωρος Παπαγιάννης: Επιστροφή στο Ελληνικό": Ντοκιμαντέρ του Παναγιώτη Κραββάρη στο ΚΕΤ", Το Παρασκήνιο, 26 March 2013
- "Θεόδωρος Παπαγιάννης Από το Ελληνικό στο... Άπειρο!", neoiagones.gr (in Greek), 15 September 2014
