= Panos Aravantinos =

Scenic and custom designer (1886–1930)

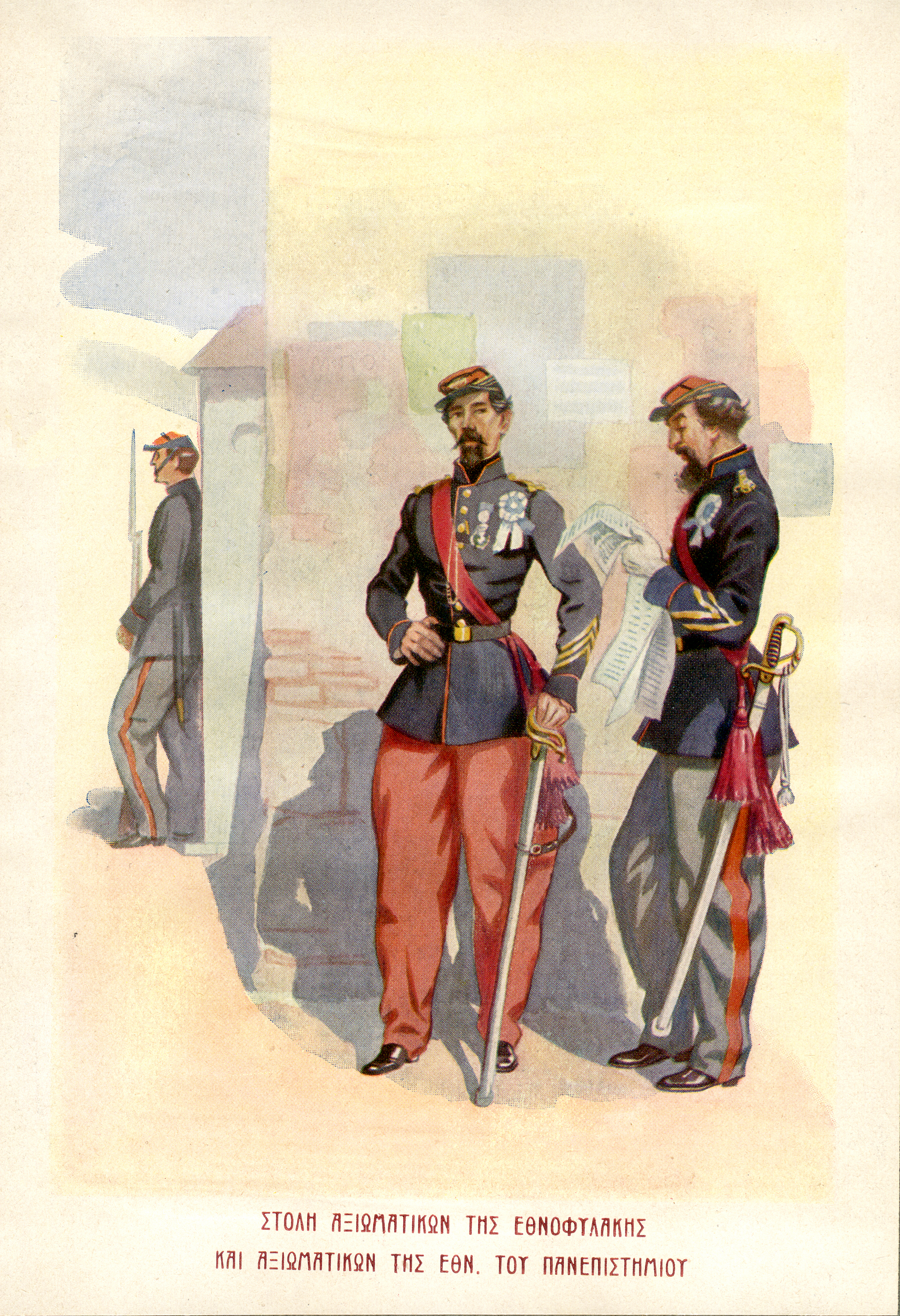
Uniforms of the National Guard during the interregnum (1862–63) after the ousting of King Otto. Officer of the National Guard (center) and officer of the University's National Guard (right). — work of Aravantinos.

Panos Aravantinos (Greek: Πάνος Αραβαντινός; Corfu, 7 September 1884 – Paris, 1 December 1930) was a Greek painter, opera and theatre scenery and costume designer and decorator.

== Life ==
Aravantinos was born in Corfu, and was educated in both Athens and Germany. He returned to Greece to fight in the Balkan Wars. It was at this time he designed a collection of uniforms for the Greek army. In 1914, he made his debut at the Royal Theatre of Athens. He won international recognition in 1920 with his set designs for the Berlin State Opera's staging of Strauss' opera Die Frau ohne Schatten.

His career in Germany reached its peak in 1926, when he was appointed as the artistic counselor for a number of Berlin theatres.

During his career, he used Constructivism, expressionism, Russian avant-garde and symbolism, as well as ancient Greek art as stylistic influences.

He died in Paris at the age of 46 from pneumonia.

1300 pieces from his collection were donated by him to the Piraeus municipality, and now reside at the Panos Aravantinos Decor Museum.

== Gallery ==
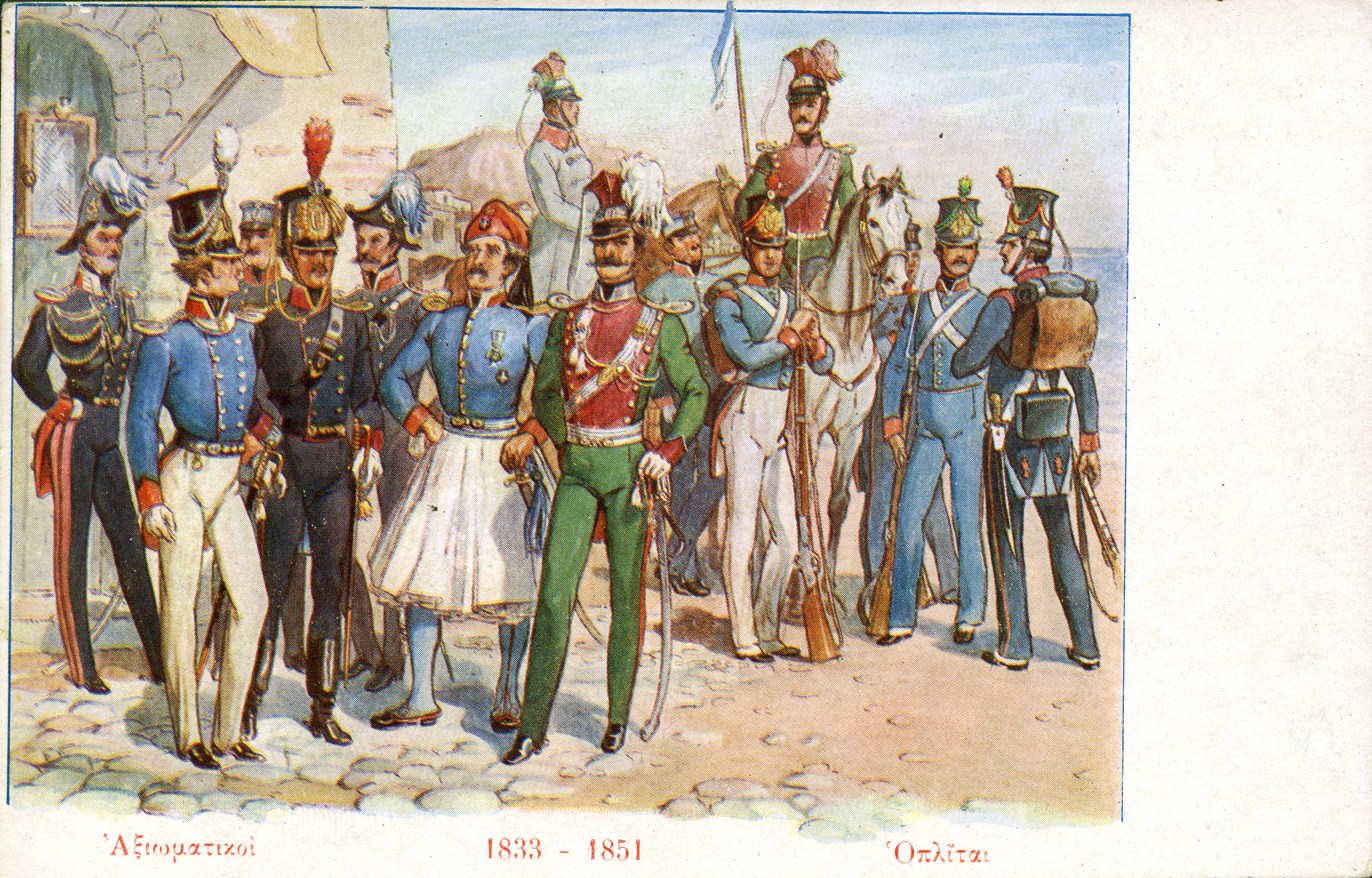
Officers and Soldiers of the Greek Army during 1833-1851

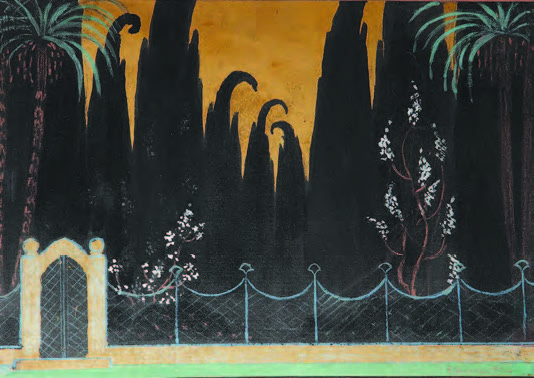
Model for 1st act of Oberon by Carl Maria von Weber (1922) Municipal Art Gallery of Ioannina

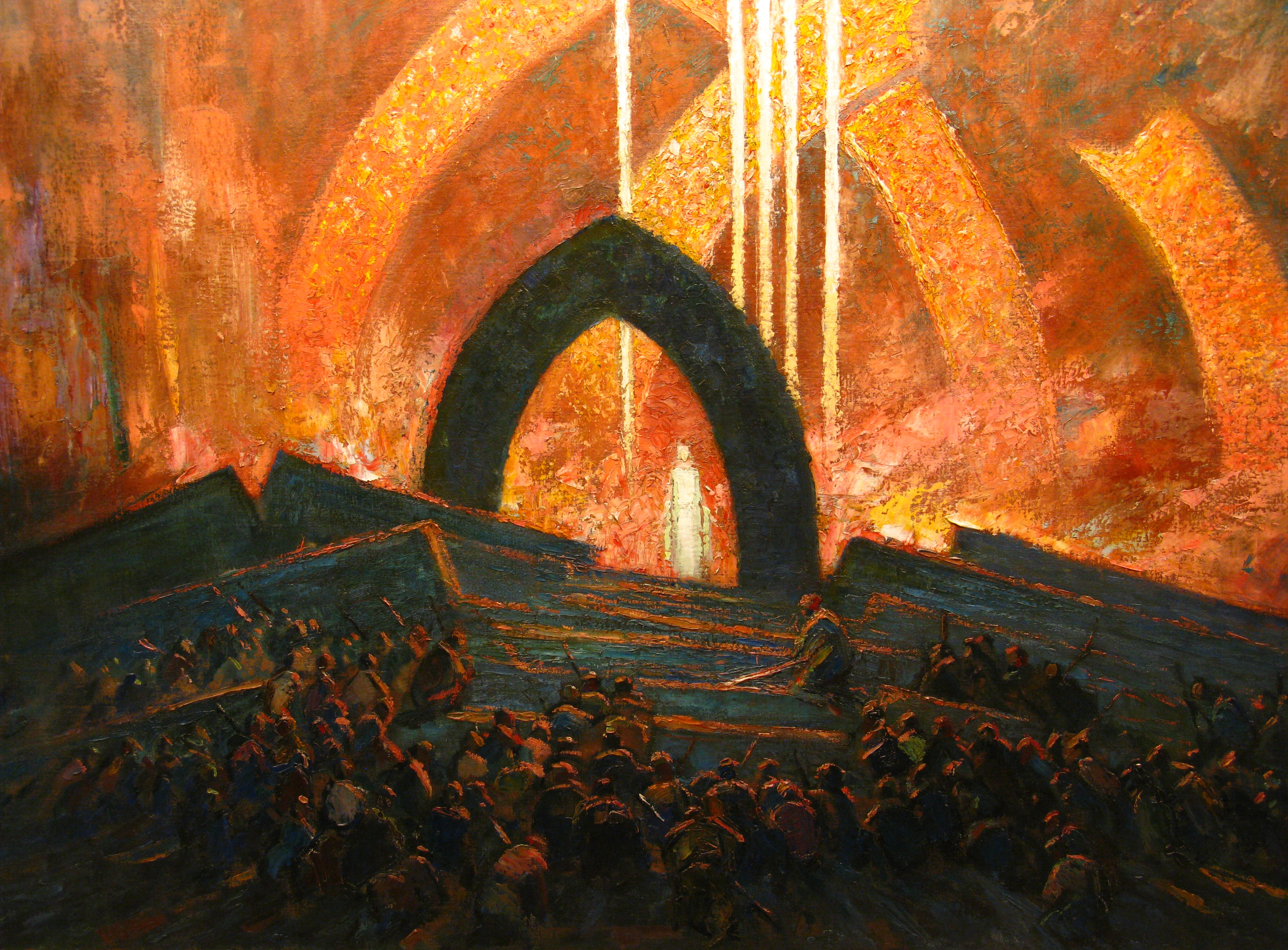
Stage Set (1928)
