= Statue of Liberty (Mytilene) =

Statue in Mytilene, Lesbos, Greece

- Άγαλμα της Ελευθερίας (Greek)
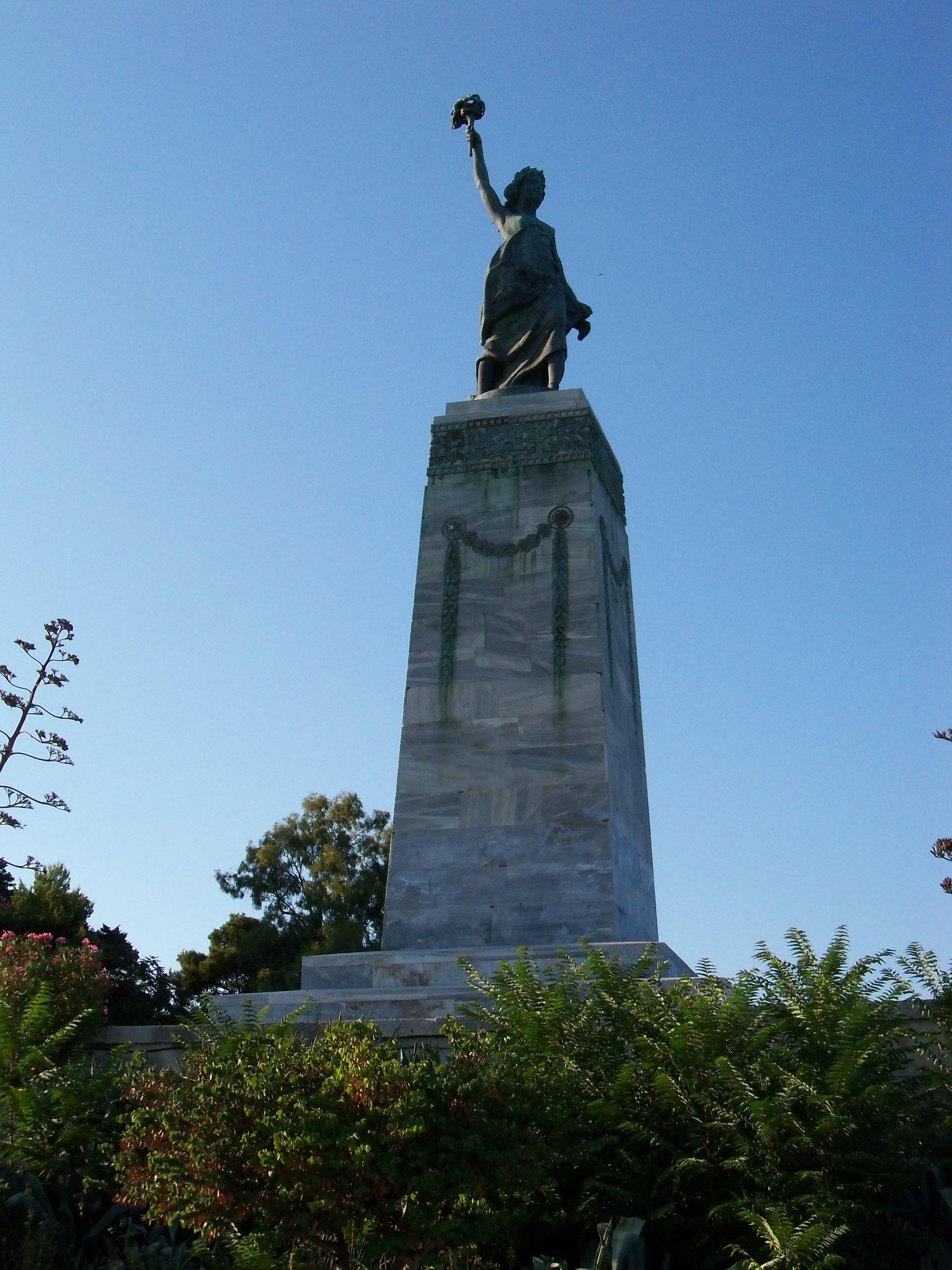
- The Statue of Liberty in Mytilene
- Completion date: 1922
- Location: Mytilene Harbor in Lesbos, Greece

The Statue of Liberty (Greek: Άγαλμα της Ελευθερίας) is a bronze statue erected at the harbor of Mytilene on the island of Lesbos in Greece.

The statue was created by Greek sculptor Gregorios Zevgolis based on a design by local painter Georgios Jakobides. It was cast in Germany in 1922, and was erected and dedicated in Mytilene in 1930.

The statue and its marble base stand 15 metres (49 ft) tall.
