= Helena Schilizzi =

Greek-British philanthropist

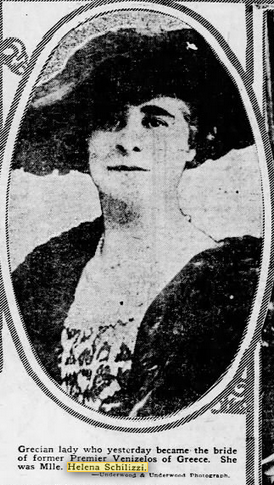
Helena Schilizzi Venizelos, from a 1921 publication.

Helena Stefanovich Schilizzi (Greek: Έλενα Σκυλίτση-Στεφάνοβικ, Elena Skylitsi-Stefanovik; 18 September 1873 – 7 September 1959), was a wealthy Greek-British philanthropist, and second wife of the Greek statesman Eleftherios Venizelos.

== Early life ==
Helena Stefanovich Schilizzi was born in Bayswater, London, the daughter of John Stefanovich Schilizzi and Virginia Sechiari Schilizzi. Her parents were both Greeks with origins in Chios, but according to the surname Stefanovich her father could have been of Serb origin; born in Constantinople, her father was a wealthy merchant.

== Philanthropy and other contributions ==
In 1917, Helena Schilizzi endowed the Koraes Chair of Modern Greek and Byzantine History, Language and Literature, a professorship at King's College London, to promote studies in modern Greek literature and history. The first holder of the Koraes Chair was historian Arnold J. Toynbee, from 1919 to 1924.

Schilizzi donated money for hospitals, theatres, schools, and for war relief and other emergencies in Greece. In widowhood, she sold her house in Athens to become the British embassy in Greece. One of her London houses in Grosvenor Square was used as a Greek embassy, during the tenure of diplomat and writer Giorgos Seferis. Helena Schilizzi Venizelos published a short memoir, À l'ombre de Veniselos ("In the shadow of Venizelos"), in 1955.

== Personal life and legacy ==
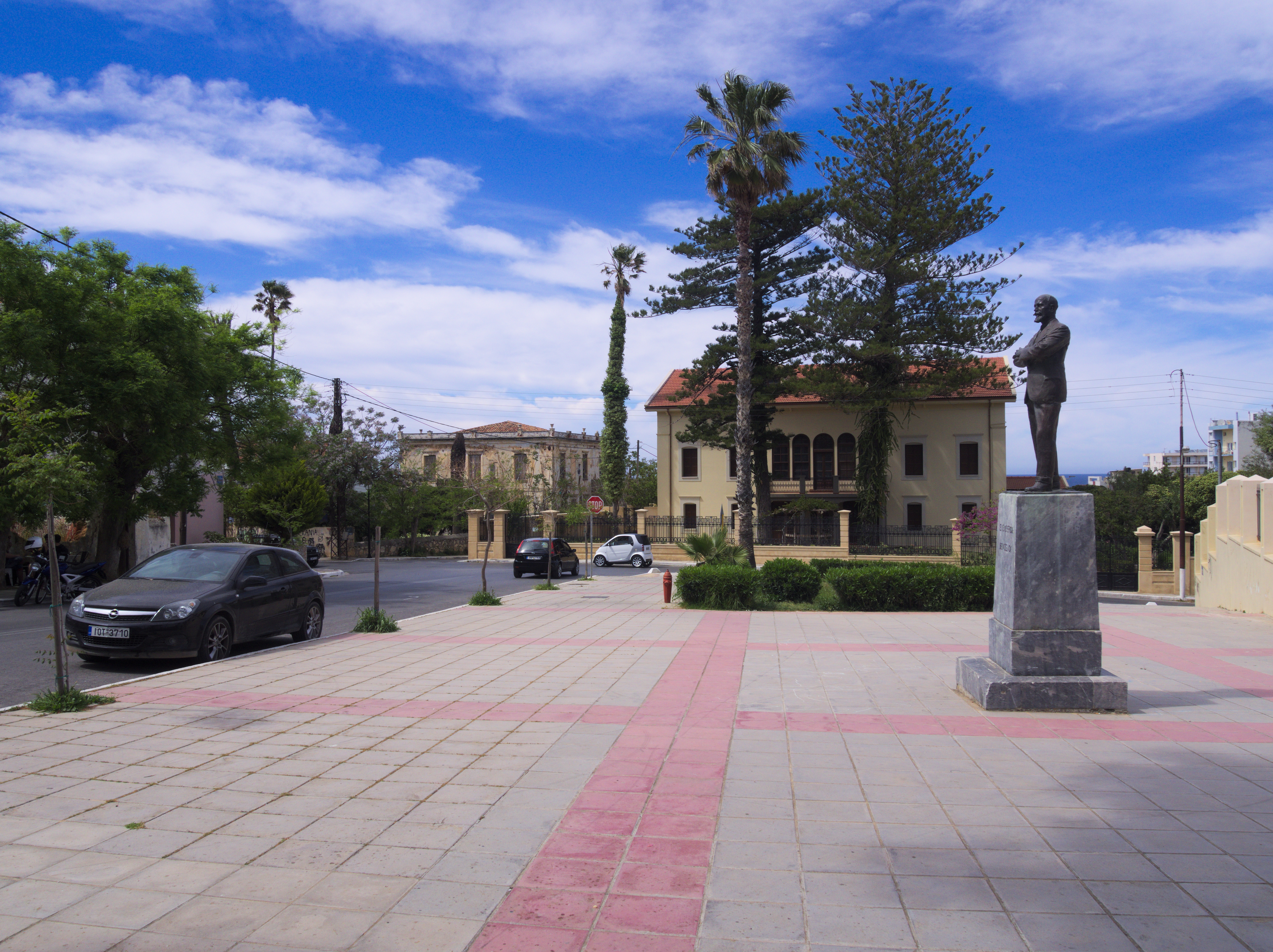
The Square of Elena Venizelou, in Chania, Crete.

Helena Schilizzi met Greek statesman Eleftherios Venizelos in 1912, and married him in 1921. She was injured in an assassination attempt against her husband in 1933, and widowed when he died in 1936. She died in Paris in 1959, aged 85 years. Today there are Schilizzi Foundation Scholarships named in her memory, awarded to students of Greek nationality studying at King's College London. In Crete (her husband's homeland) the Elena Venizelou Prize is named in her memory, and awarded to advanced music students. In Athens, there is a city square and a maternity hospital named for Helena Venizelos. There was also an oil tanker named the Helena Venizelos, built in Norway in 1958, now decommissioned or lost.
