= The Straw Hat (Lytras) =

1925 painting by Nikolaos Lytras

- Το ψάθινο καπέλο (Greek)
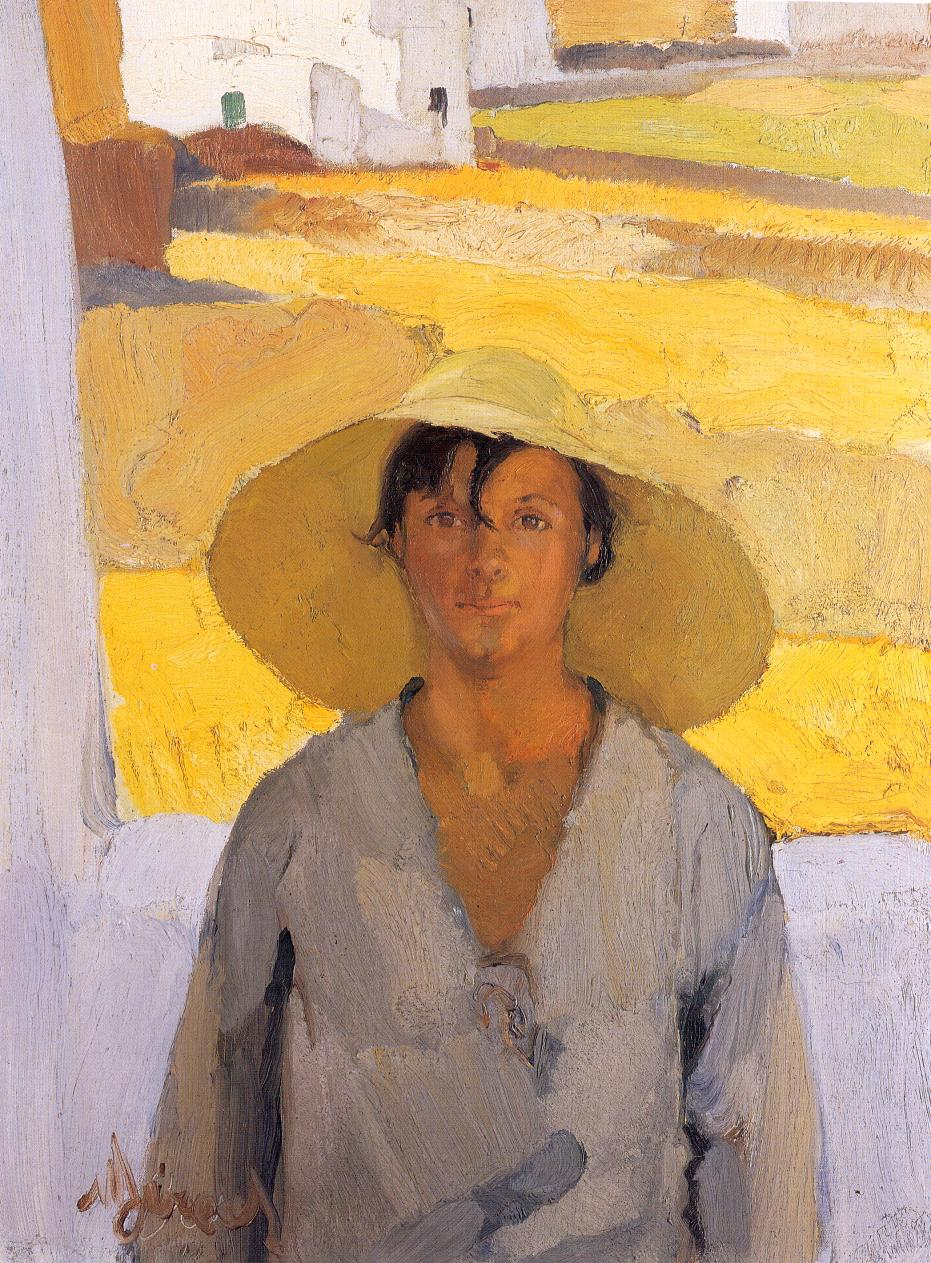
- Artist: Nikolaos Lytras
- Year: 1925
- Medium: oil on canvas
- Dimensions: 86 cm × 66 cm (34 in × 26 in)
- Location: National Gallery of Greece; Athens

The straw hat is an oil painting by Nikolaos Lytras created in 1925, and is considered one of the most daring and impressive works of early Greek Modernism. It is exhibited at the National Gallery of Greece.

== Theme ==
The theme depicts a young girl with a straw hat in a whitened courtyard in an island landscape during a hot summer day.

== Analysis ==
It is characteristic of the work of Lystras, who was one of the most notable figures of the Art Group founded in 1917 influenced by expressionism. The artist uses strong and vivid colors, cold and blue-gray cold on the bottom, orange-yellow warm colors at the top. This painting is dominated by shades of yellow with a complementary purple that paints the figure with wide free strokes of thick paint and gestural brushwork, emphasizing the material nature of the color.
