= Nikolaos Lytras =

Greek painter

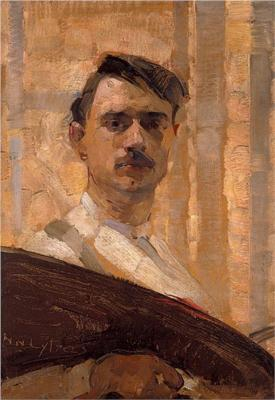
- Self-portrait (date unknown)
- Born: 2 May 1883
- Died: 1 December 1927 (aged 44)
- Education: Athens School of Fine Arts
- Style: Expressionist
- Movement: Association of Greek Artists

Nikolaos Lytras (Greek: Νικόλαος Λύτρας; Athens, 2 May 1883 – 1 December 1927) was a Greek modernist painter who specialized in portraits, still-lifes and landscapes.

== Biography ==
He studied painting at the Athens School of Fine Arts from 1902 to 1906, where he was taught by his father, Nikiforos Lytras, and also by Georgios Jakobides. After that, he transferred to the Academy of Fine Arts, Munich, and studied with Ludwig von Löfftz, among others, until 1912. While there, he also came under the influence of Der Blaue Reiter, a group of Expressionist painters, and created illustrations for the novel A Tale with No Name by Penelope Delta.

He left Munich to enlist in the Balkan Wars, serving as an officer and making sketches of Turkish fortifications. When he returned home, with several decorations, he began to participate in the exhibitions of the "Association of Greek Artists", often exhibiting together with the sculptor Gregorios Zevgolis. Later, they opened a joint studio in the old workshop of Lazaros Sochos. In 1917, he joined with Konstantinos Parthenis and others to establish "Ομάδα Τέχνη" (The Art Group), with the aim of countering German Academicism in Greek art. His group won the support of Eleftherios Venizelos and the Liberal Party.

In 1923, he and Parthenis were candidates to take over the management of the School of Fine Arts. Lytras won the position, despite opposition based on the fact that his father was a major representative of the Munich School. His primary contribution involved changing the structure and role of the workshops; turning them into independent units. He held this position until his death from tuberculosis in 1927.

A major retrospective of his work was given at the Zappeion in 1929.

== Selected paintings ==
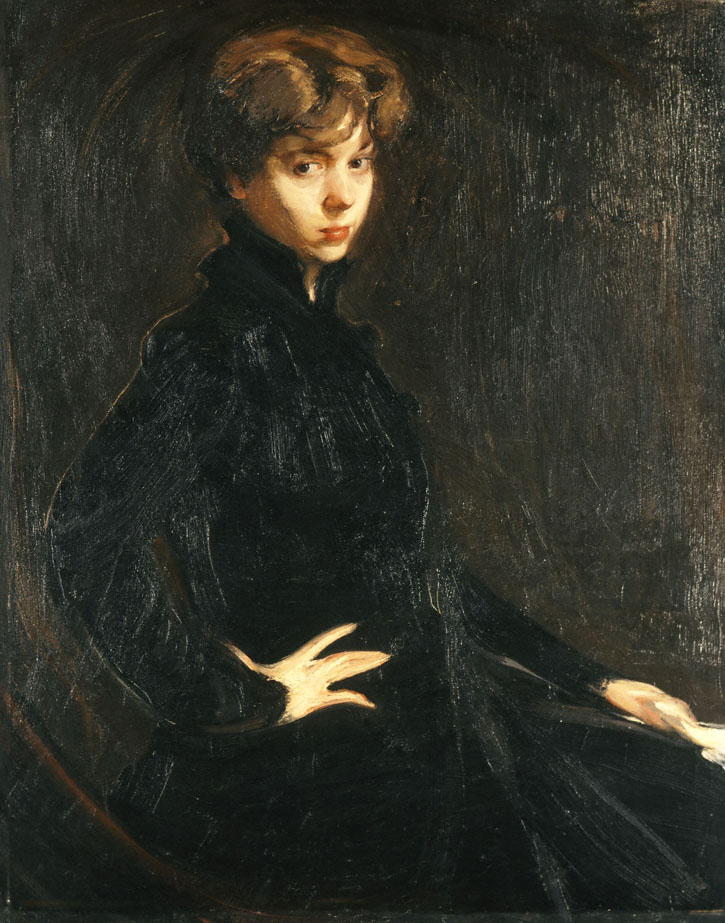
Portrait of his wife,
Maria Horsch

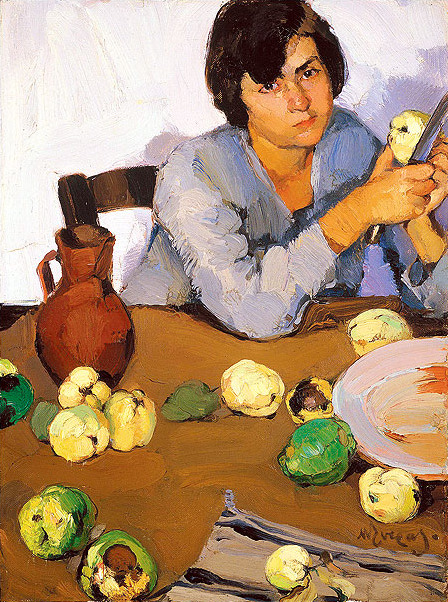
Peeling Quinces

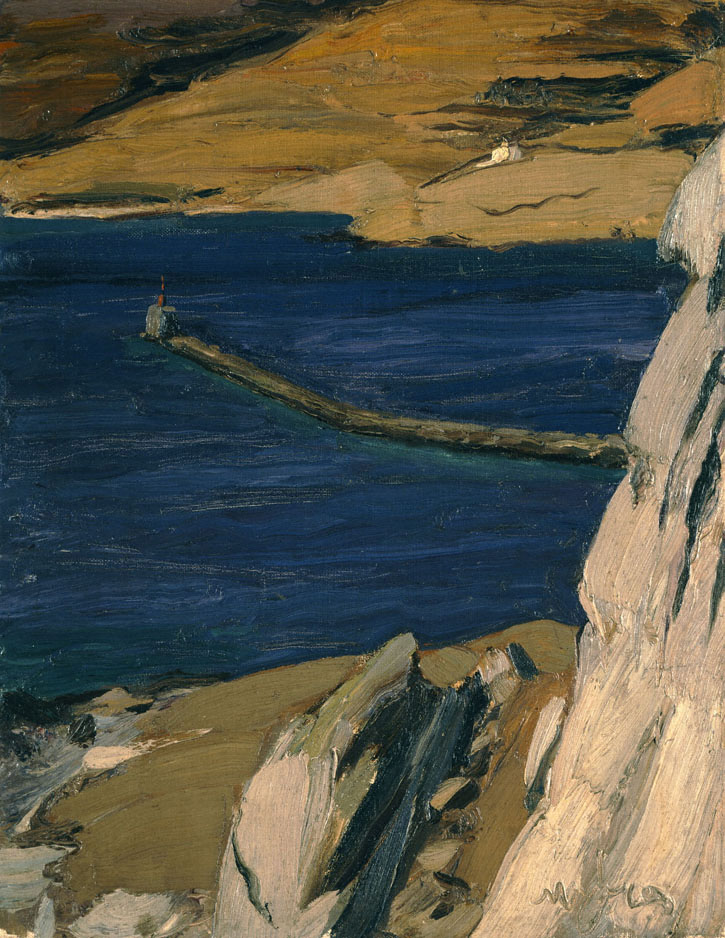
Lighthouse

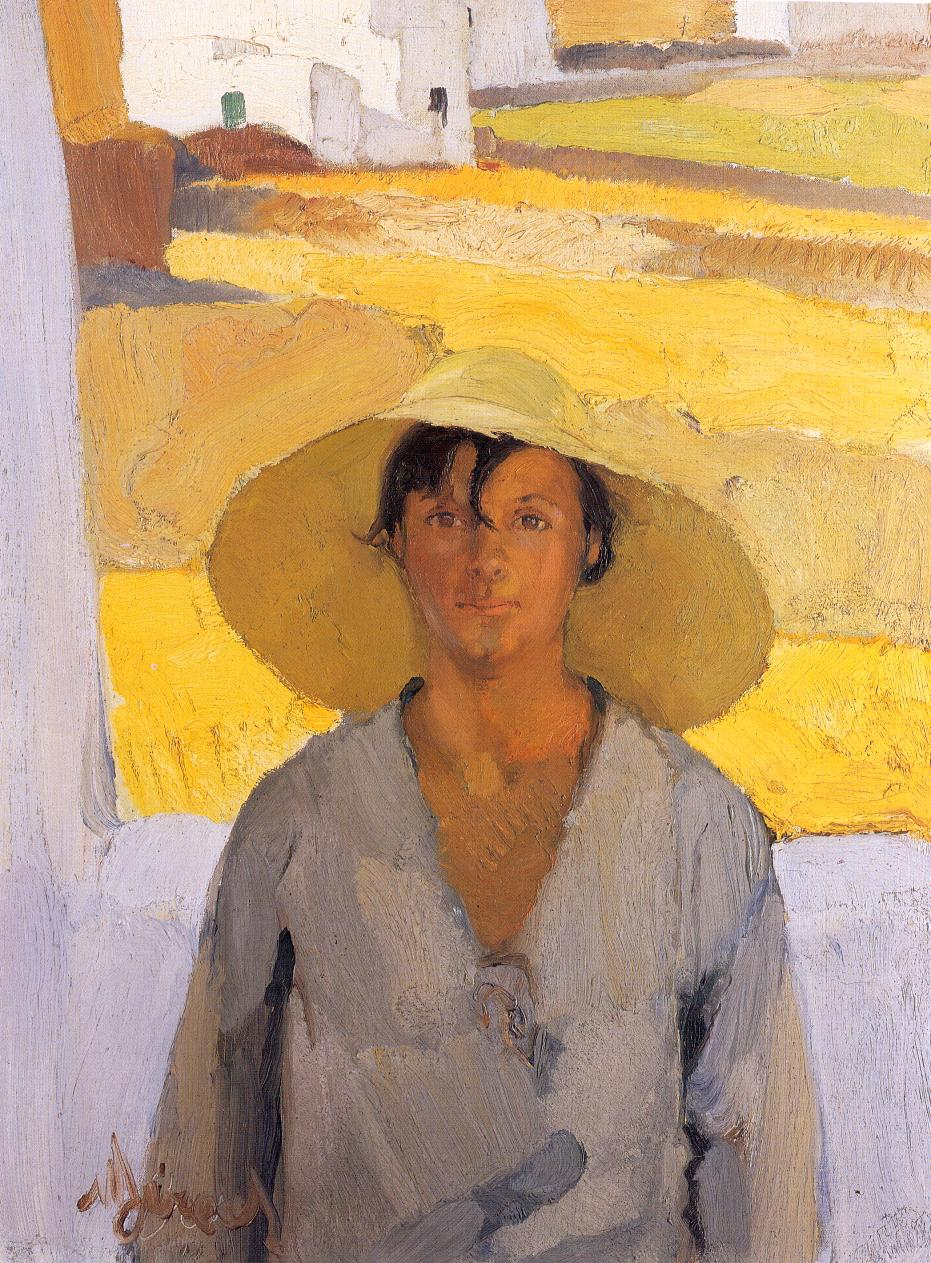
The Straw Hat

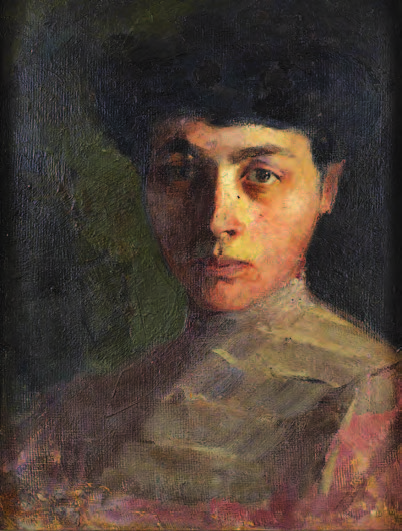
Marika Apostolou (1906) Municipal Art Gallery of Ioannina
