= Orfeas Lytras =

Greek footballer

Personal information
- Full name: Goulielmos Orfeas Lytras
- Date of birth: 28 July 1998 (age 28)
- Place of birth: Itea, Phocis, Greece
- Height: 1.88 m (6 ft 2 in)
- Position: Goalkeeper

Team information
- Current team: Nea Salamis Famagusta
- Number: 12

Youth career
- –2016: Panionios
- 2016–2017: Levadiakos
- 2017–2018: Inter Limassol

Senior career*
Years	Team	Apps	(Gls)
2018–	Nea Salamis Famagusta	4	(0)
- * Club domestic league appearances and goals as of 13:49, 13 March 2020 (UTC)

Orfeas Lytras (Greek: Ορφέας Λύτρας; born 28 July 1998) is a Greek professional footballer who plays as a goalkeeper for Cypriot club Nea Salamis Famagusta.

== Club career ==
=== Nea Salamis Famagusta ===
On 7 April 2019, Lytras made his debut in the Cypriot First Division for Nea Salamis Famagusta in a game against Apollon Limassol.
