= Georgios Vroutos =

Greek sculptor (1843–1909)

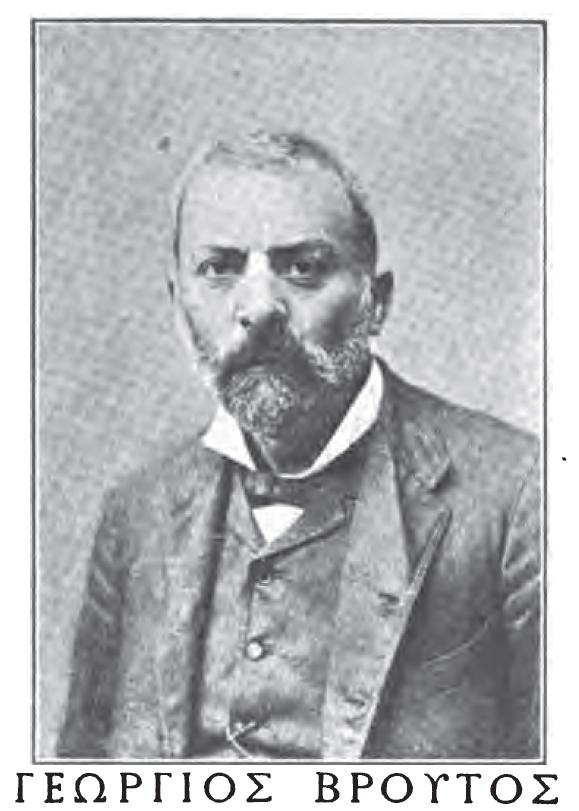
Geogios Vroutos

Georgios Vroutos (Greek: Γεώργιος Βρούτος; Athens 1843 – January 10, 1909, Athens) was a Greek sculptor of the 19th century.

== Biography ==
Georgios Vroutos was born in Athens in 1843, into a family originating from Crete. He studied sculpture at the School of Fine Arts from 1859 to 1864 under Georgios Phitalis and also took courses in marble carving at the workshop of the famous professor and sculptor Ioannis Kossos. In 1866, he traveled to Rome with a scholarship from Queen Olga, where he stayed for three years, studying under the supervision of Canova, Adamo, Tantolini and Filippo Niakarini. During his time in Italy, he worked on behalf of an Italian banker. When he returned to Greece in 1873, he opened his own sculpture workshop in the district of Plaka and in 1883 he was appointed professor of sculpture at the School of Fine Arts, as successor to Leonidas Drossis who had just died. Vroutos retained this position till his own death. In 1888 he was proclaimed a member of the Academy of Fine Arts in Paris. He was also a founding member of the Historical and Ethnological Society of Greece. He died in Athens, on January 10, 1909.

== Works ==
Among the most renowned works of Vroutos, is the statue of Adamantios Korais in front of the University of Athens central building (Panepistimiou Street), and the one of Konstantinos Zappas, in front of the Zappeion exhibition hall. A statue of him is also located in Istanbul, Turkey. In the cemetery there are two monuments of the artist, representing Papadakis and Rallis respectively. The Museum of Boston, bought the statues of Achilles and Paris, both artistic creations of Vroutos. An unexpectedly bold creation of his is the "Spirit of Copernicus" located at the National Gallery of Athens, sometimes described as a "technical marvel". The artist creates the feeling that the body of a winged demon is flying, falling towards the Earth's sphere, while it is relying on a garment that has been crushed. The composition seems to have broken the law of gravity. The artist does nevertheless not seem to have further explored this daring path in his later career.

== Gallery ==
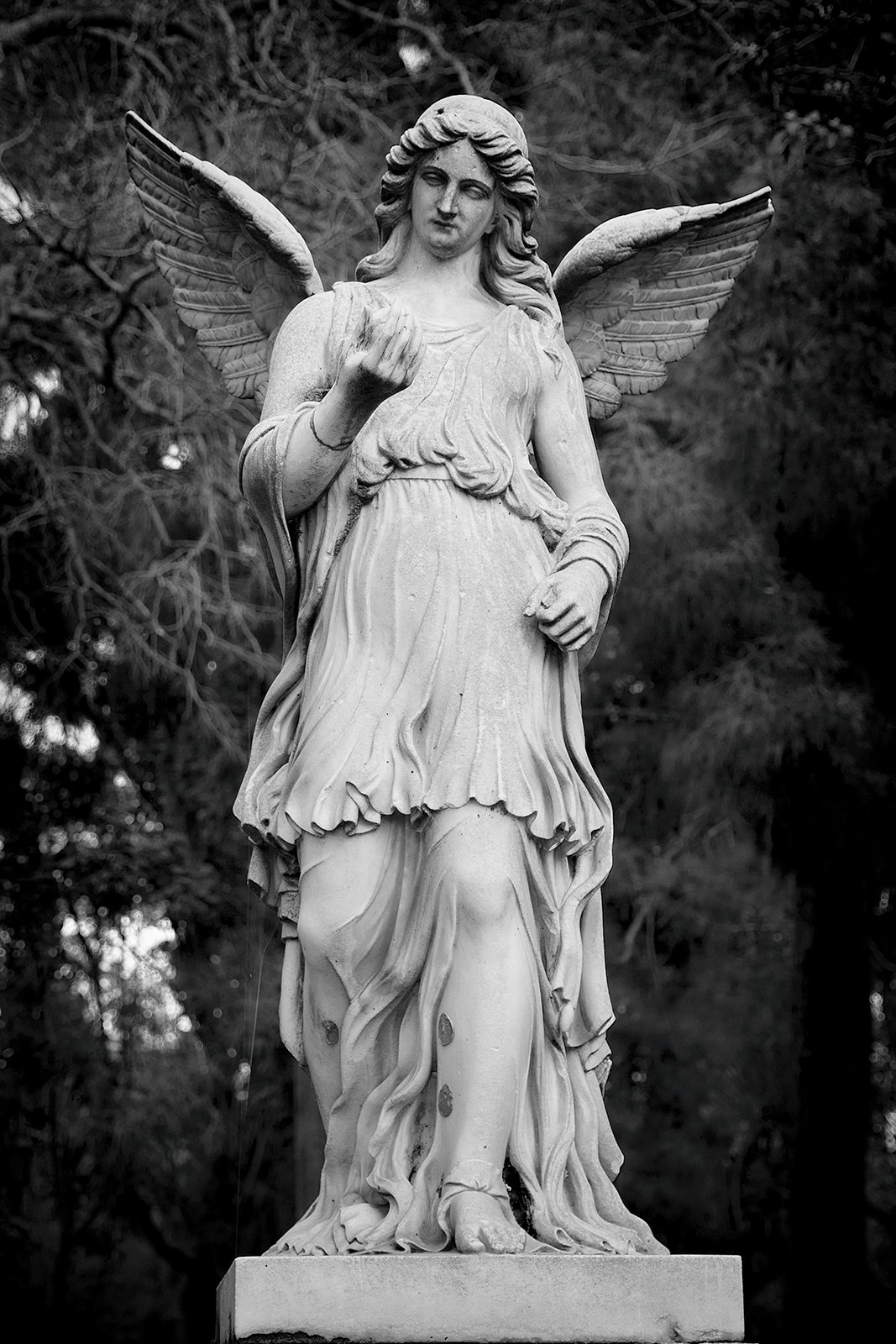
Angel.

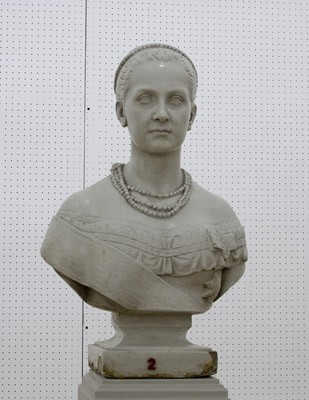
Bust of Queen Olga of Greece.

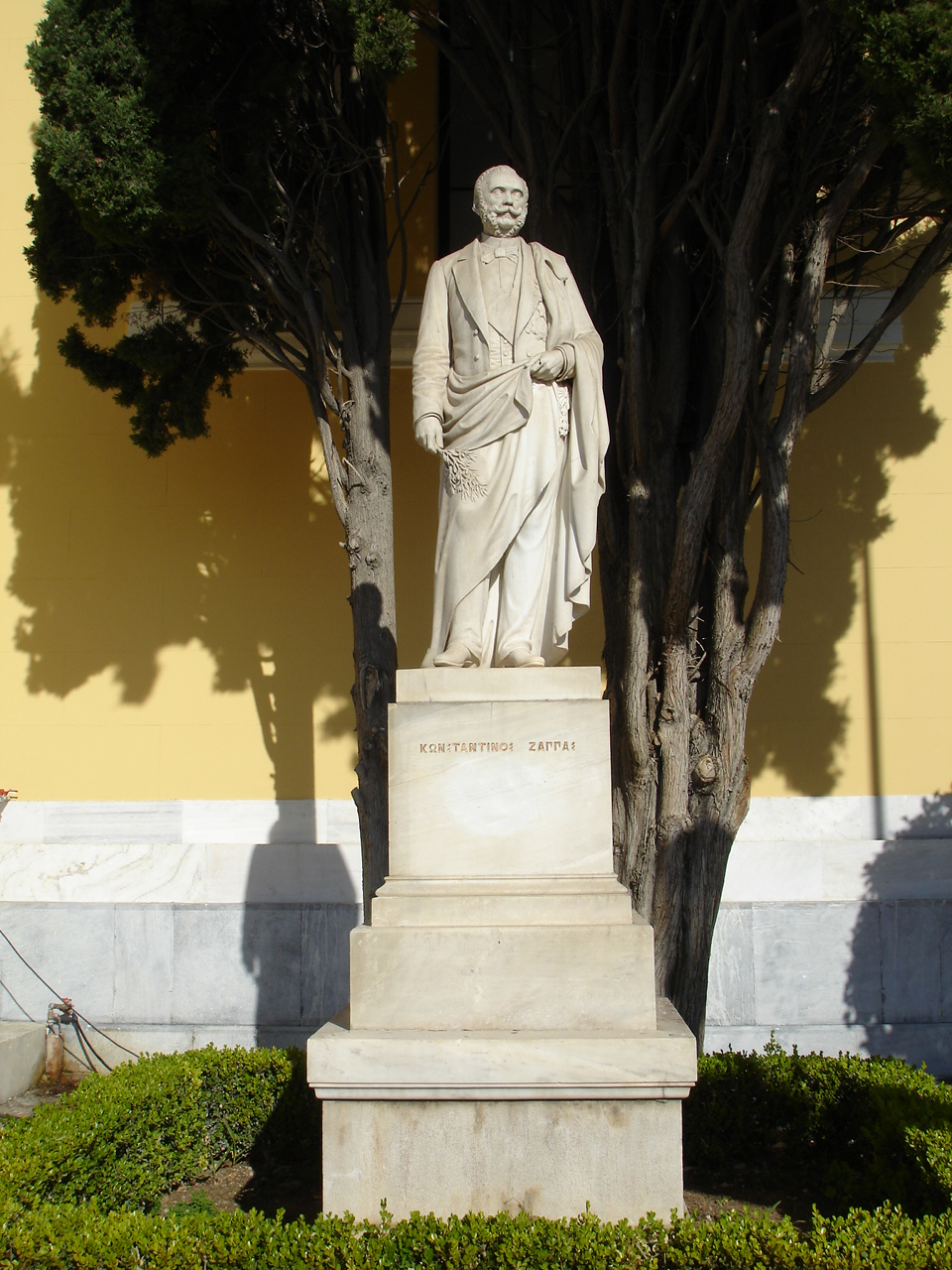
Statue of Konstantinos Zappas.

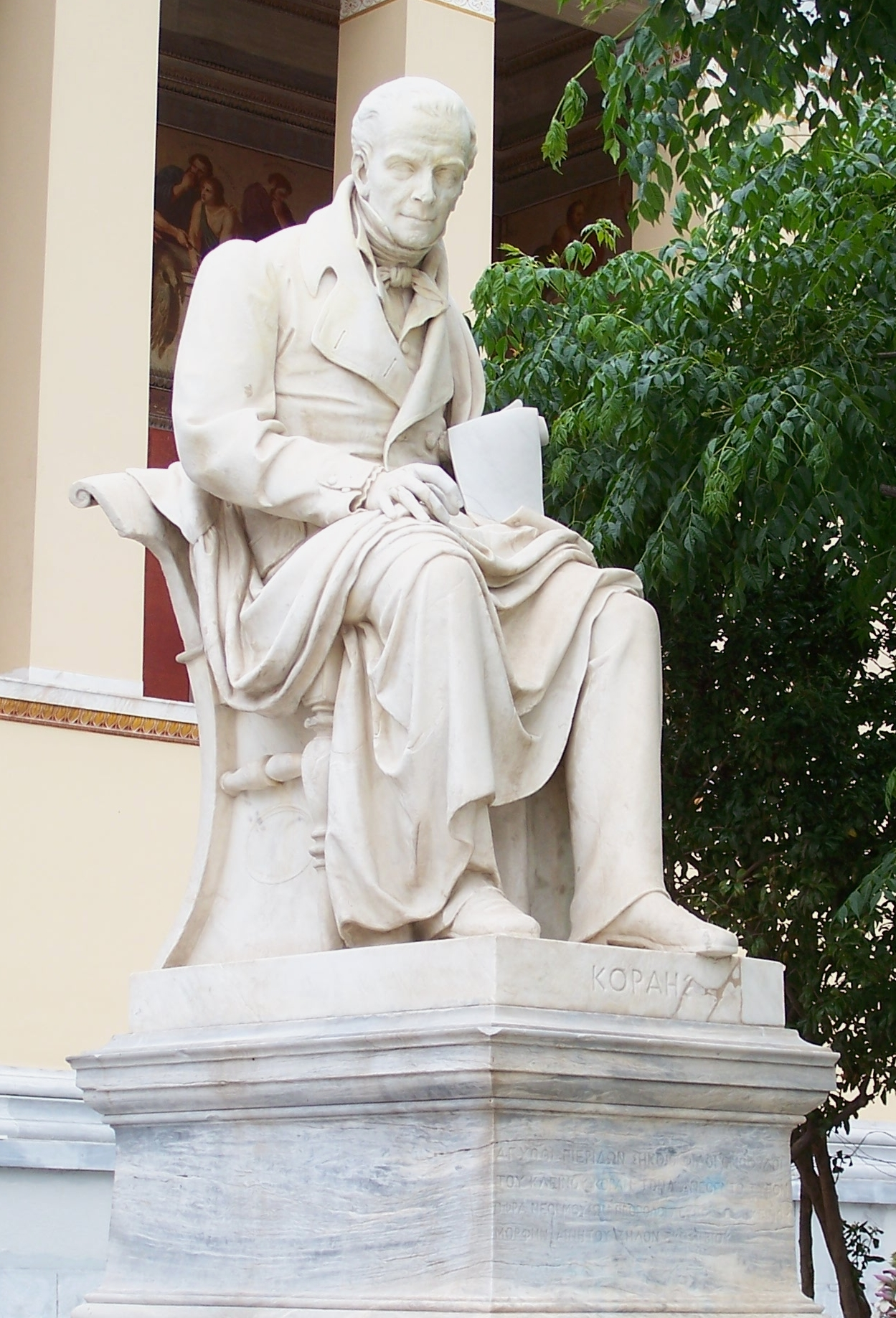
Statue of Adamantios Korais.

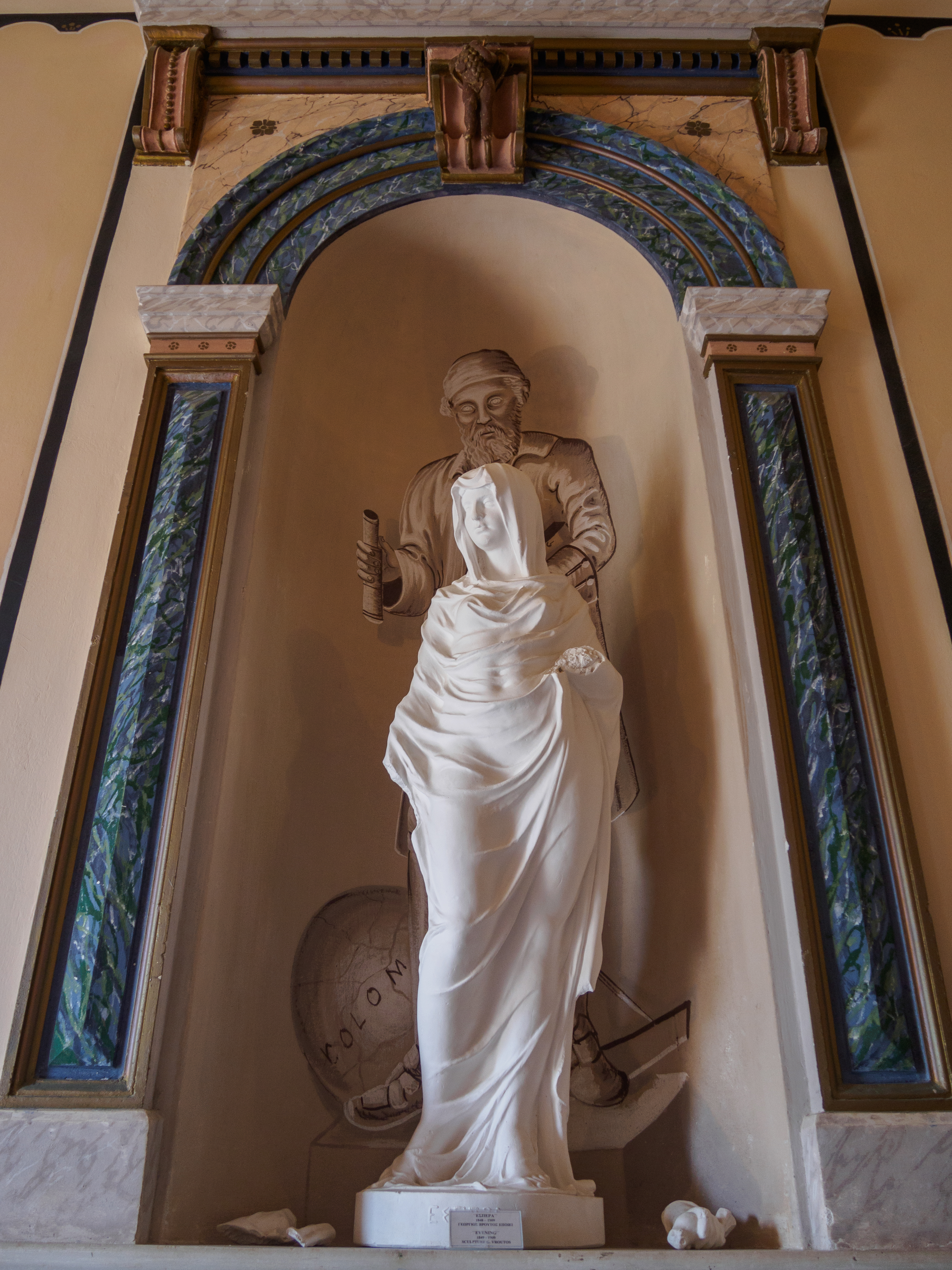
Statue of Evening in Argyros Mansion

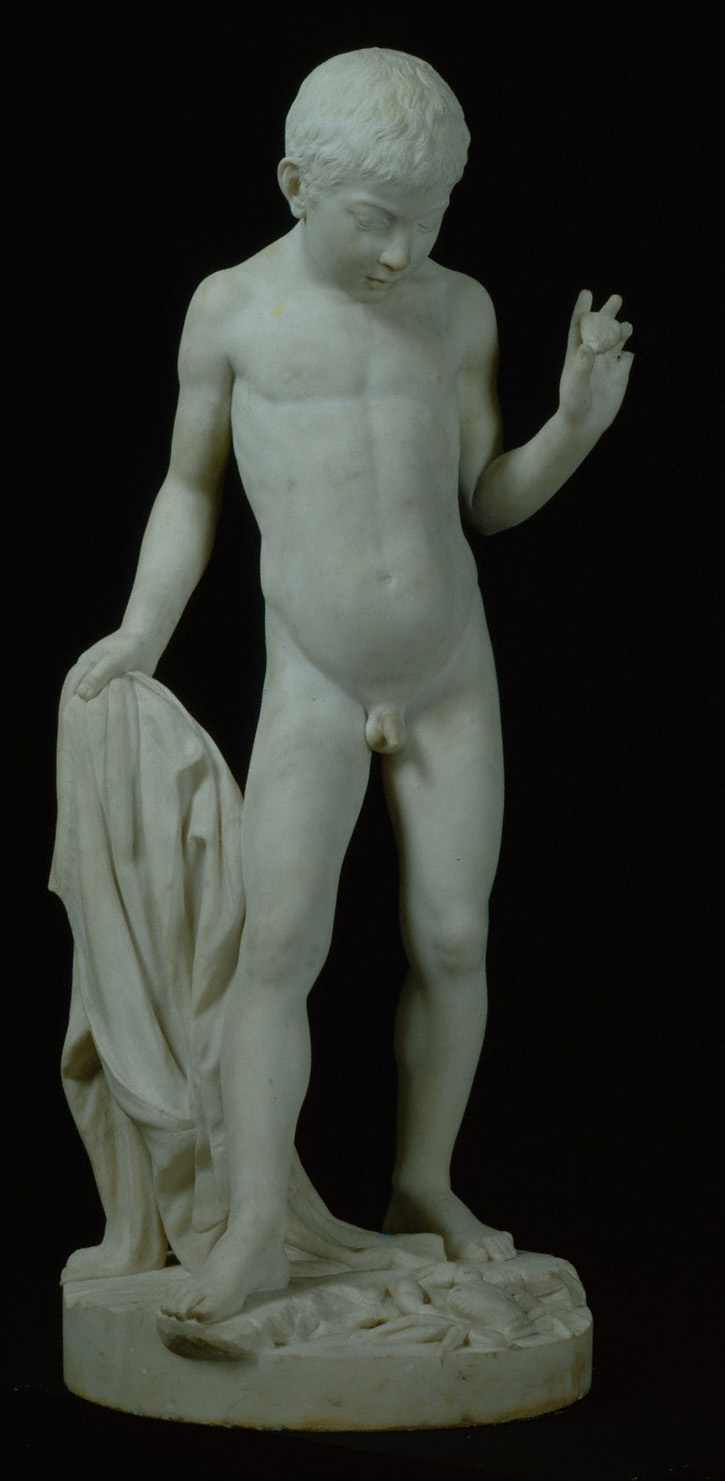
Boy with a Crab

== Bibliography ==
- Aikaterini Dermitzaki (2013). The National and Historical Museum of the Historical and Ethnological Society of Greece: founding, collecting policy and other actions (1882–1926) [Το Εθνικό Ιστορικό Μουσείο της Ιστορικής και Εθνολογικής Εταιρείας της Ελλάδος: ίδρυση, συλλεκτική πολιτική και άλλες δράσεις (1882–1926)]. Athens: National and Capodistrian University of Athens. (Greek)
- Pavlos Diomedes (1894). Hestia[Εστία]. Athens: Georgios Drosinis, Publisher Hestia. p. 40–43.
