= Kypriadou =

Kypriadou Κυπριάδου
- Neighborhood
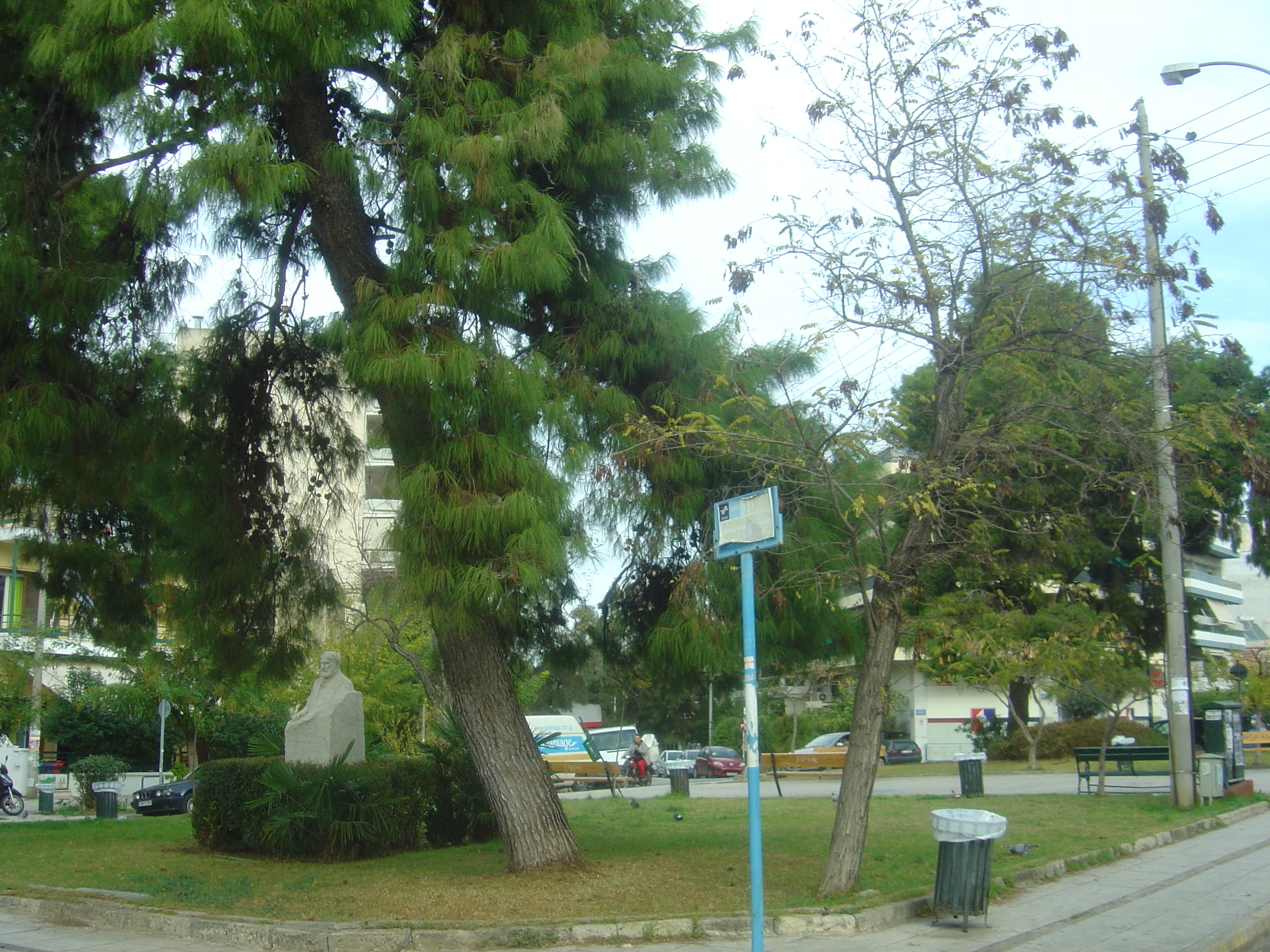
- Papaloukas Square

- Location within Athens
- Coordinates: 38°1′18″N 23°44′37″E
- Country: Greece
- Region: Attica
- City: Athens
- Postal code: 111 41, 111 42
- Area code: 210
- Website: www.cityofathens.gr

Kypriadou (Greek: Κυπριάδου pronounced [ci.pɾiˈa.ðu]), formerly known as Alysida (Greek: Αλυσίδα pronounced [aliˈsiða]) is a neighborhood of Athens, Greece.

It is named for agronomist Epameinondas Kypriadis (1888-1958).

== Transport ==
Ano Patisia metro station on Line 1 of the Athens Metro serves the area.
