= The Italian Straw Hat =

The Italian Straw Hat (French: Un chapeau de paille d'Italie) may refer to:

- The Italian Straw Hat (play), original name Un chapeau de paille d'Italie, an 1851 five-act farce by Eugène Marin Labiche and Marc-Michel
- The Italian Straw Hat (1928 film), original name Un chapeau de paille d'Italie, a French silent film adaptation
- The Italian Straw Hat (1941 film), a French film adaptation by Jacques Chabannes and Maurice Cammage, directed by Cammage
- The Italian Straw Hat, a 1955 opera by Nino Rota usually called Il cappello di paglia di Firenze
