= George Bouzianis =

Greek painter (1885–1959)

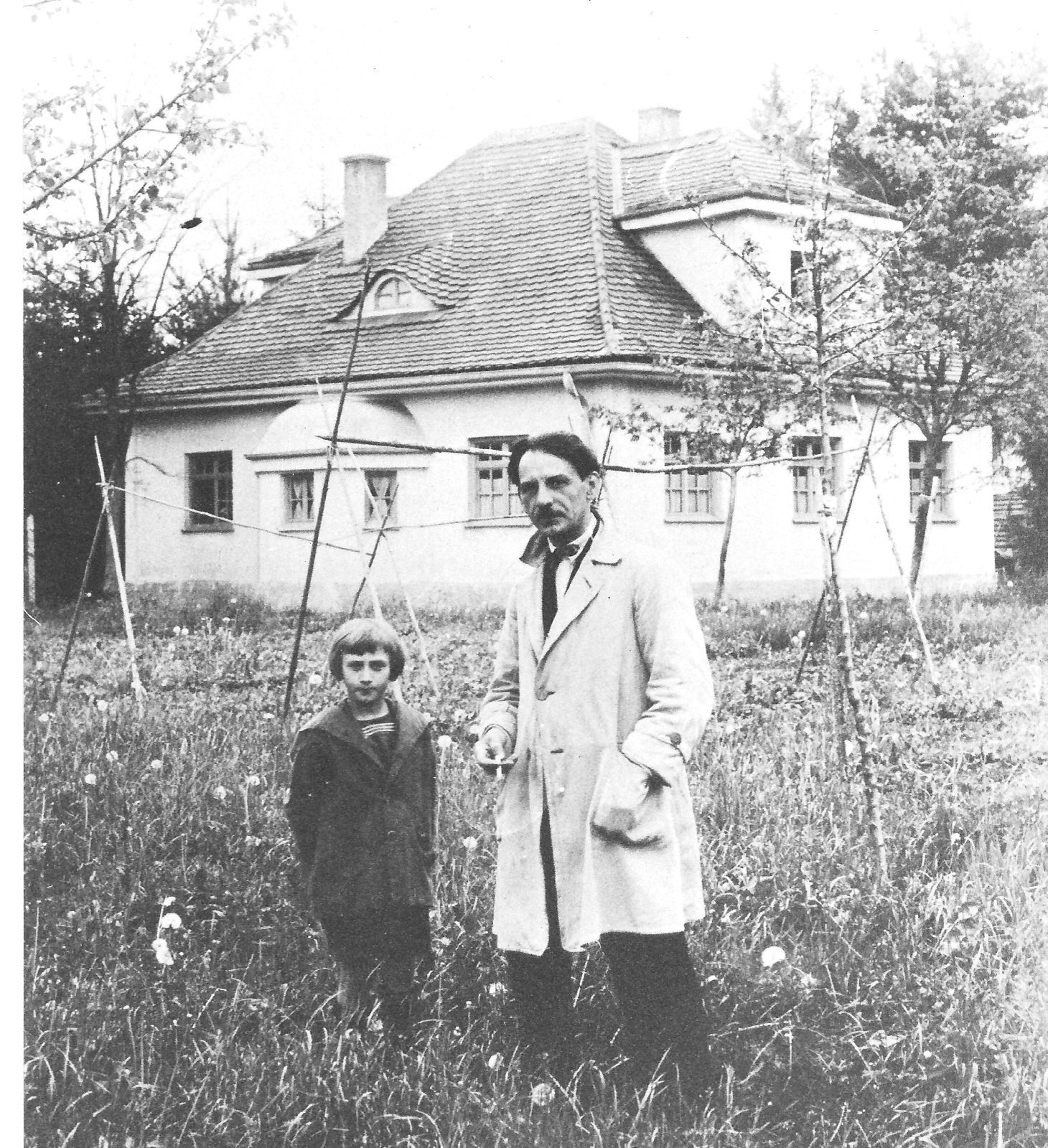
- Born: November 8, 1885; Athens, Greece
- Died: October 23, 1959 (aged 73); Athens, Greece
- Occupation: Painter
- Style: Expressionist

George Bouzianis (Greek: Γιώργος Μπουζιάνης; German: Jorgos Busianis; November 8, 1885 – October 23, 1959) was a major Greek expressionist painter.

== Biography ==
Georgios Bouzianis Museum, Dafni

Bouzianis was born November 8, 1885 in Athens, Greece and studied painting at the Athens School of Fine Arts from 1897 to 1906 with teachers such as Nikiphoros Lytras and Konstantinos Volanakis, Georgios Roilos and Dimitrios Geraniotis.

In 1907 he moved to Munich, Germany to continue his art studies with Walter Thor, Georg Schildknecht, and Otto Seitz. In 1910 he moved to Berlin, where he learned from Max Liebermann and befriended Giorgio de Chirico. By 1917 he had adopted elements of German expressionism in his own individual artistic style. He soon became a respected artist in Germany and began exhibiting with the Barchfeld gallery in Leipzig. In 1927 in Chemnitz there was an exhibition of his work along with sculptor Alexander Fischer. He was a member of the expressionist group Neue Secession and participated in its exhibition in Munich in 1928.

After a visit to Vienna in 1929, Bouzianis travelled and lived in Paris between 1929 and 1932 with the financial support of the Barchfeld gallery. Due to the financial crisis across Europe he had to return to Eichenau near Munich, where he had built a house. Unfortunately, expressionism was gradually fading away in Germany with the rise of Nazism in Germany's politics.

In 1934 he returned to Greece. To his own disappointment he failed to take a position at the School of Fine Arts of Athens. Initially, Bouzianis was treated with hostility from the Athenian artistic circles who started to appreciate his oeuvre after his exhibition at Parnassos gallery in 1949, his only solo show in Greece. He also exhibited at the Panhellenies exhibitions (1938, 1939, 1952), with the Spirit-Level group (1951-1953), at Erlangen (1952) and Rome (1953), and with the Group of Five (1957). He was a founding member of the Stathmi group in 1949.

In 1950 he represented Greece at the Venice Biennale and in 1956 he was awarded with the first award of the Guggenheim competition for Greece.

Bouzianis died in Athens on October 23, 1959.

His house after his death in Dafni, Attica has been converted to a museum. His paintings are today exhibited at the National Gallery of Athens and in many other museums in Greece and abroad.

== See also ==
- Art in modern Greece
- National Gallery of Greece
