= Tony Spiteris =

Greek art historian and critic

Tony Spiteris (Τώνης Π. Σπητέρης, Corfu, 1910 - Athens, 1986), was an intellectual, art historian, and art critic in Greece during the second half of the 20th century.

== Career ==
He studied Economics in Belgium and Aesthetics at the Sorbonne. His wife was sculptor Jeanne Spiteris-Veropoulou. Spiteris' career in the cultural sector began in 1947, and he was active in writing about art in both Greek and international daily and periodical press. His life was divided between Athens (1939-1958 and 1975–1986), Venice (1958-1963), and Paris (1963-1975). His tenure as commissioner for the Greek pavilion at the Venice Biennale (1958-1967) was particularly successful, with Greek artists Giannis Spyropoulos in 1960 and Vaso Katraki in 1966 receiving awards. Spiteris himself received the International Critics' Prize at the Venice Biennale in 1958 and 1960.

During his years in Paris, he was at the center of Europe's artistic movement, meeting some of the most significant artistic personalities globally. He never ceased working to promote Greek Art abroad, organizing major exhibitions, including the first "International Sculpture Exhibition" (the famous "Panathenaea") on the Philopappou Hill (1965) and the large exhibition "Treasures of Cyprus" (1967), which toured 12 countries. His written work includes significant studies on Greek and Cypriot art, focusing on the 19th and 20th centuries.

Spiteris was also a member of international cultural committees and friends with famous artists and intellectuals, such as André Malraux, Christian Zervos, Henry Moore, Alberto Giacometti, Salvador Dalí, and many Greek and Cypriot intellectuals and artists.

From a young age, Spiteris collected information on Greek and global art, artists, history, politics, and culture. He gathered material from the events he participated in and his travels worldwide.. This material, meticulously organized into a valuable archive, was updated until the end of his life. His acquaintance with Aliki Telloglou was pivotal in his decision to donate his archive to the Teloglion Fine Arts Foundation at the Aristotle University of Thessaloniki in 1984. The archive, containing over 84,000 physical documents, is fully cataloged and digitized, largely accessible to researchers.
