= Nikolaos Ventouras =

Greek artist & engraver (1899–1990)

Nikolaos Ventouras (Greek: Νικόλας Βεντούρας; August 31, 1899 – April 1, 1990) was a Greek artist and engraver.

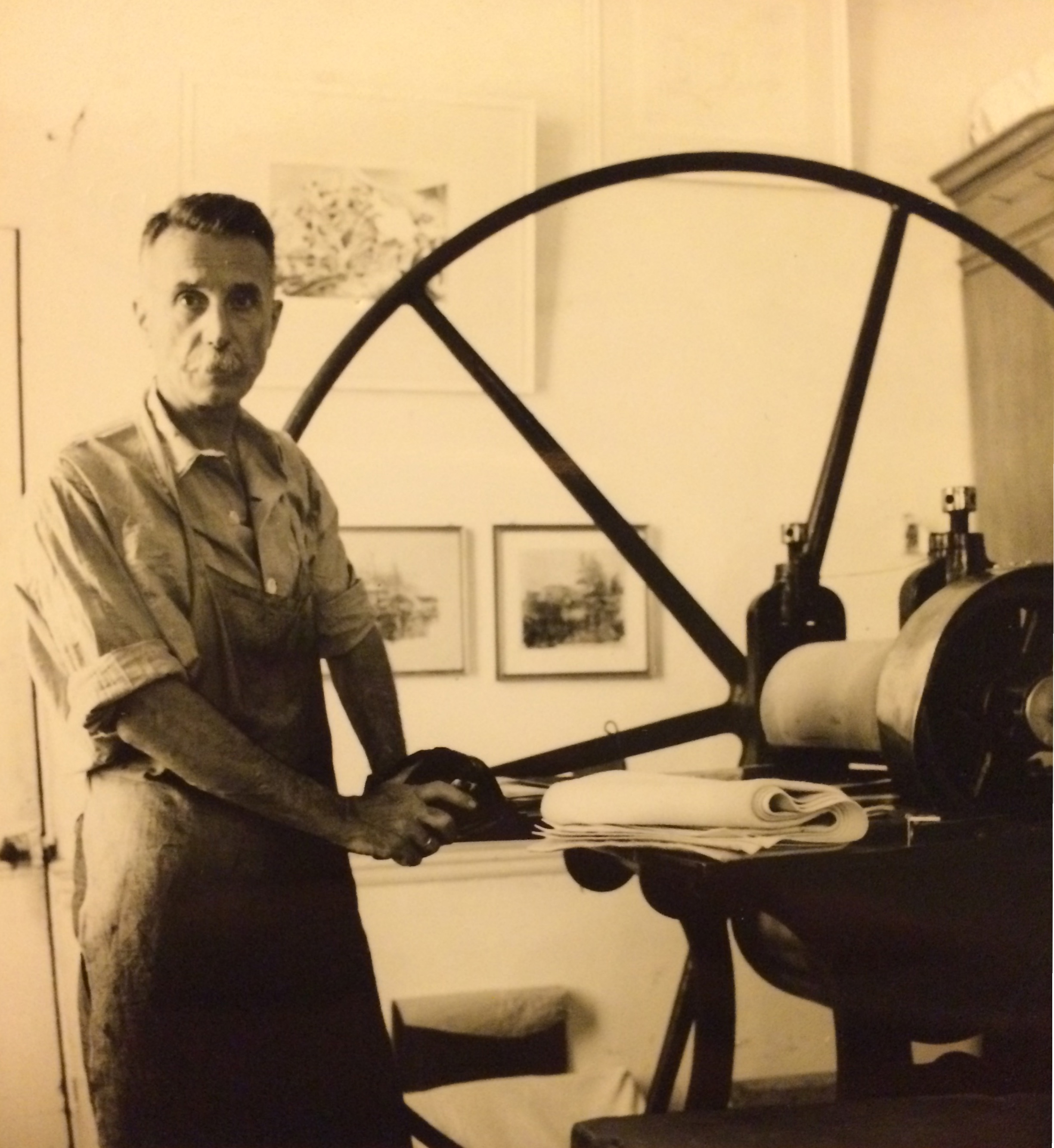
Ventouras in his workshop

== Biography ==
Nikolaos Ventouras was born the 31st of August 1899, in a noble family of the region of Venice, Veneto, which was included in the Libro d'Oro. The family settled on the island of Corfu around 1730. Members of the family defended the island in the Siege of Corfu (1716). In fact one of his ancestors was the writer Isabella Teotochi Albrizzi and Ioannis Kapodistrias, who was his great uncle. He had one brother, married 2 times, had a daughter from his second marriage and a grandson. He studied chemistry but became one of the greatest engravers of the 20th century. He did not study further, but since he was familiar with a number of languages, he acquired his own, deep education, particularly around issues of art and philosophy.

It has been written about him "if etching had not been discovered, surely he would have discovered it".

Nikos Ventouras passed on April 1, 1990.

== The first years ==
As Ventouras noted on his resume, drafted in 1981, "already from the early classes of elementary school, I was taught sketching".

In 1916, Ventouras took a 2-year class to study chemistry in Athens at the Academy of Commerce and Industry, but never worked as a chemist. Although he had no academic studies on art, his devotion and persistence guided him in his work.

During the 1920s he served in HMS Ramillies.

Ventouras was a passionate photographer and never missed a chance to capture life with his Rolleiflex. Some of his photos were chosen by the National Geographic. He also loved traveling, motorcycles and bicycles. In 1923, from March 16 to May 5 he travelled from Brindisi to Vienna with a group of cyclists.

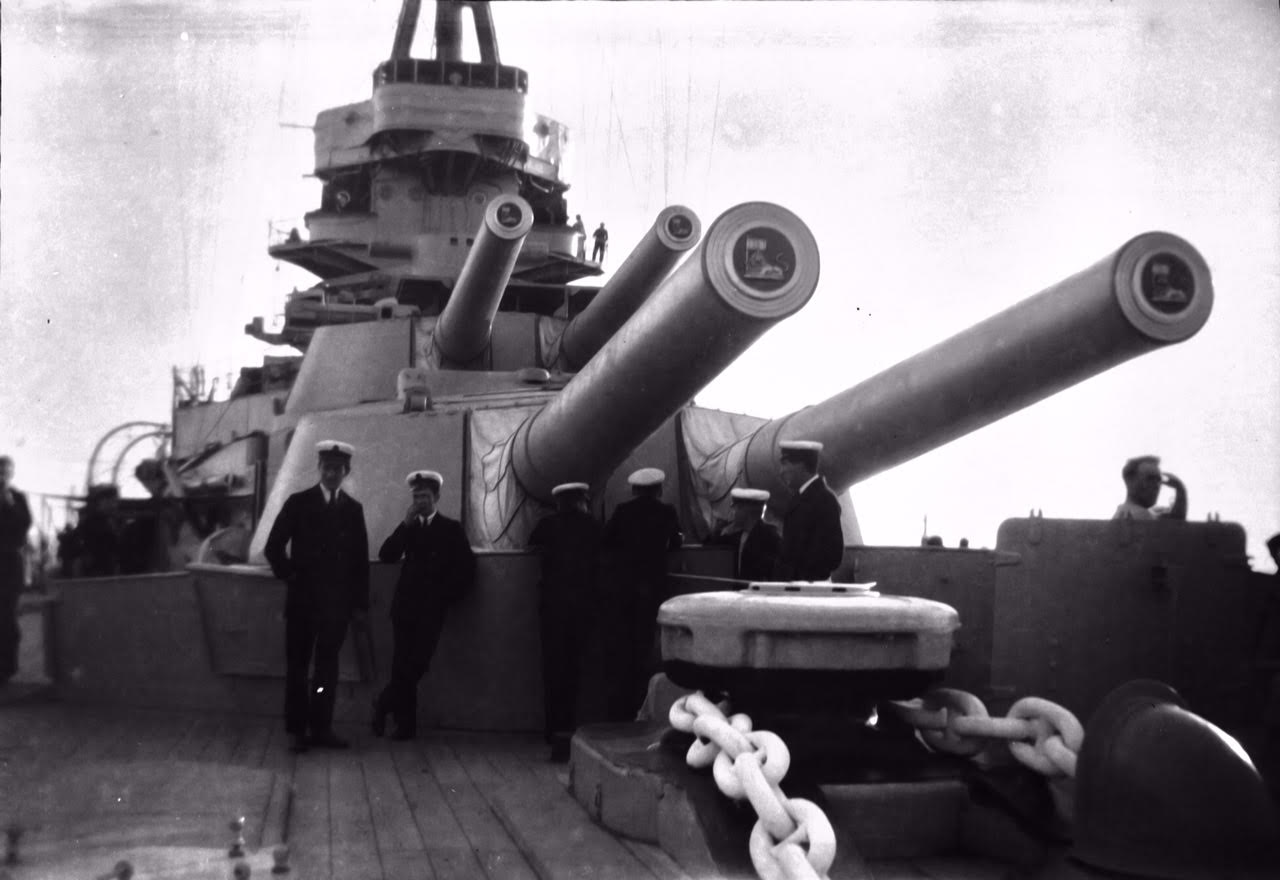
HMS Ramillies, picture by Ventouras

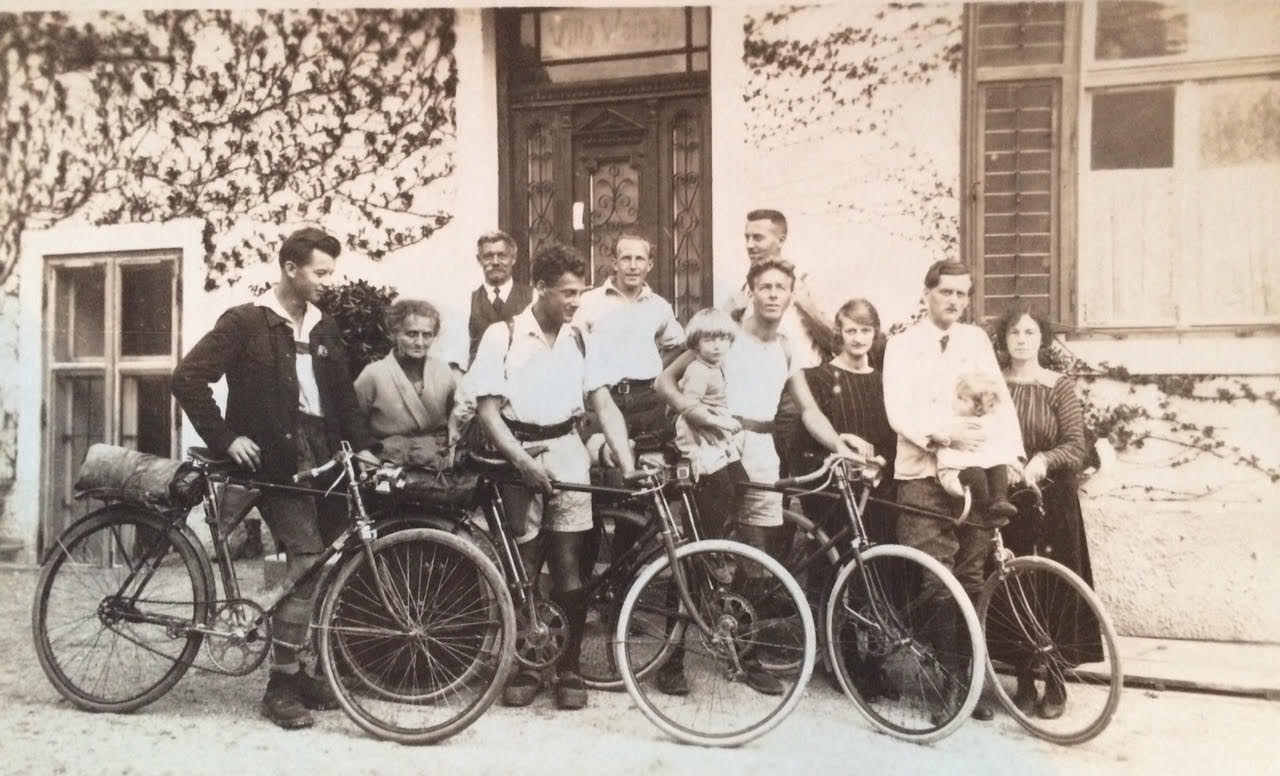
Cycling trip from Brindisi to Vienna

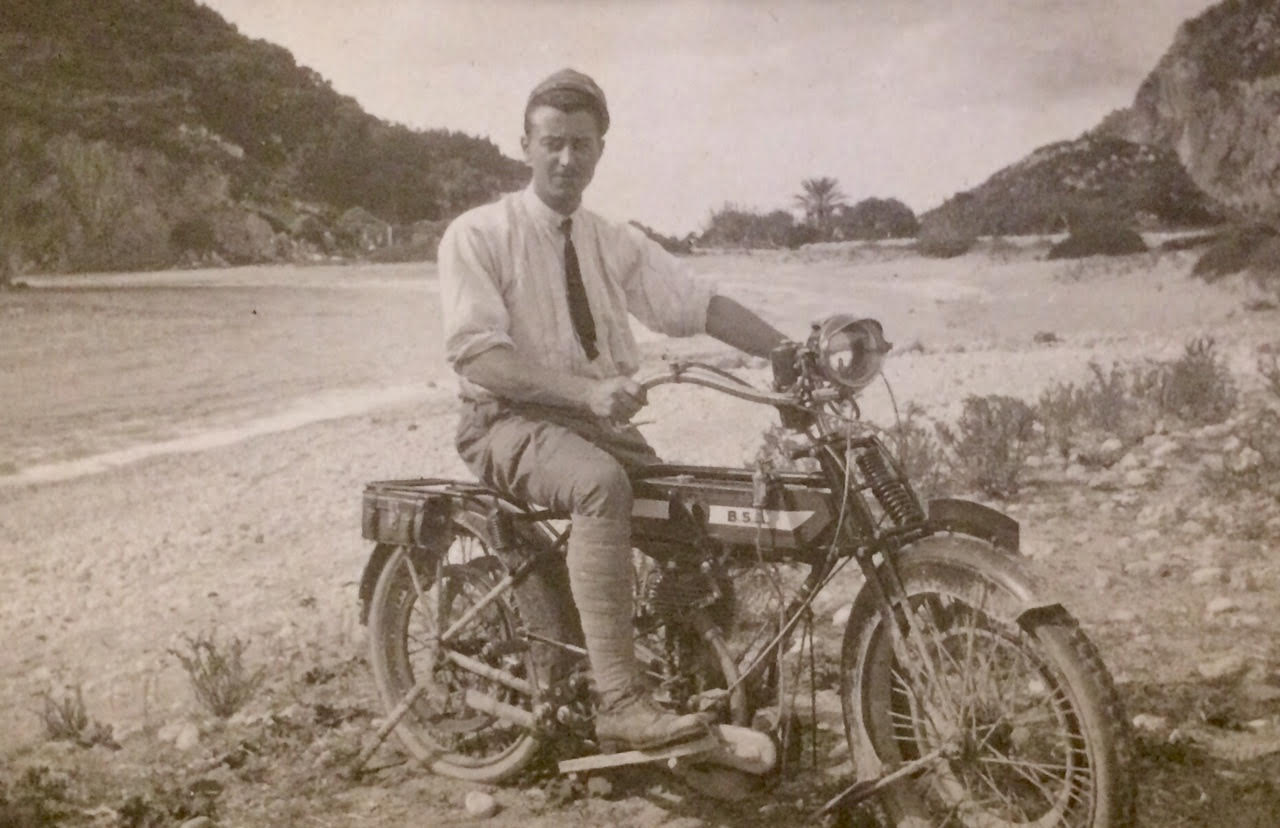
Ventouras on his bike

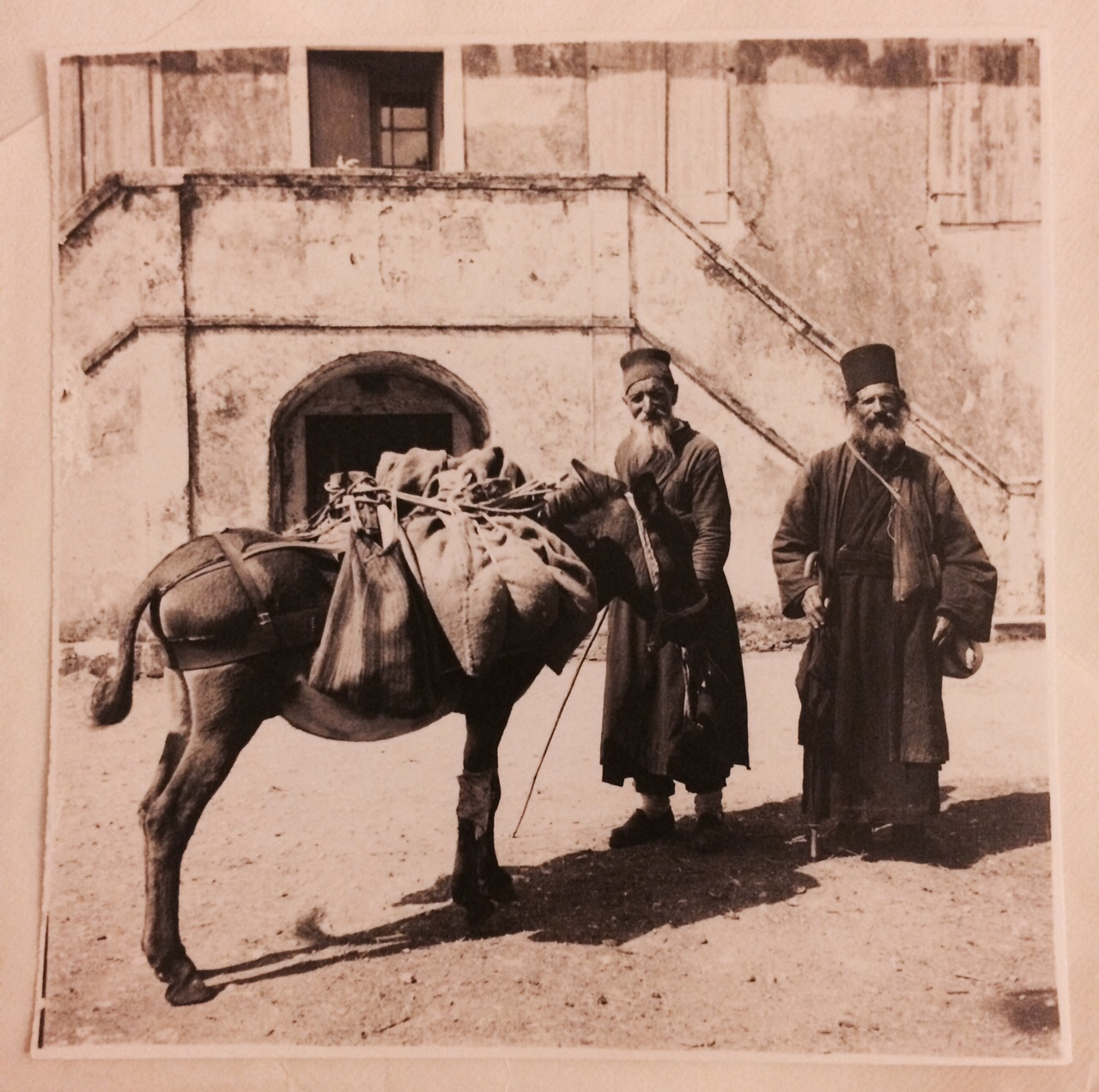
Photo contributed by Ventouras (1932) and published by the National Geographic

== Art history ==
It's generally agreed that the starting point of Ventouras's artistic career were the watercolour lessons he received from Angello Giallina, from 1931 to 1937.

Ventouras started printmaking, specifically engraving in wood, etching on copper and stone (a relatively new technique, invented by the German Alois Senefelder), as early as 1932, feeling reluctant in respect to his tutor. But engraving won him over and he focused his interest in perfecting it. In his résumé he notes "self-taught excluding lithography which I was taught". He took some lithography courses in 1937. Primarily, the evolution of the engraving was personal and he evolved several variations of known techniques.

Ventouras's complete work consists of dry-point, vernis mou, aquarelle, oil, wood etching, copper etching, lithography, lithography on zinc, printing fabric, photogravure, monotypes and custom prints for Ex Libris, books, magazines, stamps, greeting cards etc. The study of chemistry and the study of bees helped him experiment with materials and corrosion times, which helped him achieve the exact level of detail he intended.

Due to his persistence and his evolution in the area of etching he is considered a pioneer of printmaking.

== Art style ==
Ventouras drew inspiration mainly from the local tradition of Corfu focusing his on themes of the city life in the Corfu town, rural landscapes and the ships, using the human form only in complementary roles. Other thematic sections, but to a lesser extent, can be identified as his landscapes, the famous constellations, processions, religious performances and his completely abstract compositions. Color was used to accentuate his feeling and therefore it is not uncommon to find variations of his works with color. Furthermore, he uses the visual styles of the European era with equivalent expressionist, surrealist and cubist elements, which are reflected in his works.

With seemingly fast lines that give a capacity in his works, Ventouras managed to give an abstract character which differentiates them from conventional standards of his time. This brings etching side by side with the modernist tendencies of Greek art. His works reveal a modernist approach, especially for his time, as the building blocks of visual configurations released by the initial visual stimuli and simultaneously incorporate his personal expression. He uses an expressionist idiom, but not distinguished for its brutality in a more poetic character.

Ventouras was the only Greek artist who served printmaking with such dedication, persistence and consistency for over half a century and has maintained throughout his work a morphoplastic idiom.

Ventouras kept notes for each of his works, alongside the organization of the workshop, tools, and apprenticeship. In the note he kept detailed notes, including intended emotion, the length of a task and when finished, the technique used and materials. The same project would be written about for long spans of time, noting the project and it's progress. The raw materials were thoroughly registered. For paper he noted weight, type, date and origin and how that affects the result of "printing". The colors were always clean and he made himself the blend of colours and chemical compounds in order to achieve the desired result.

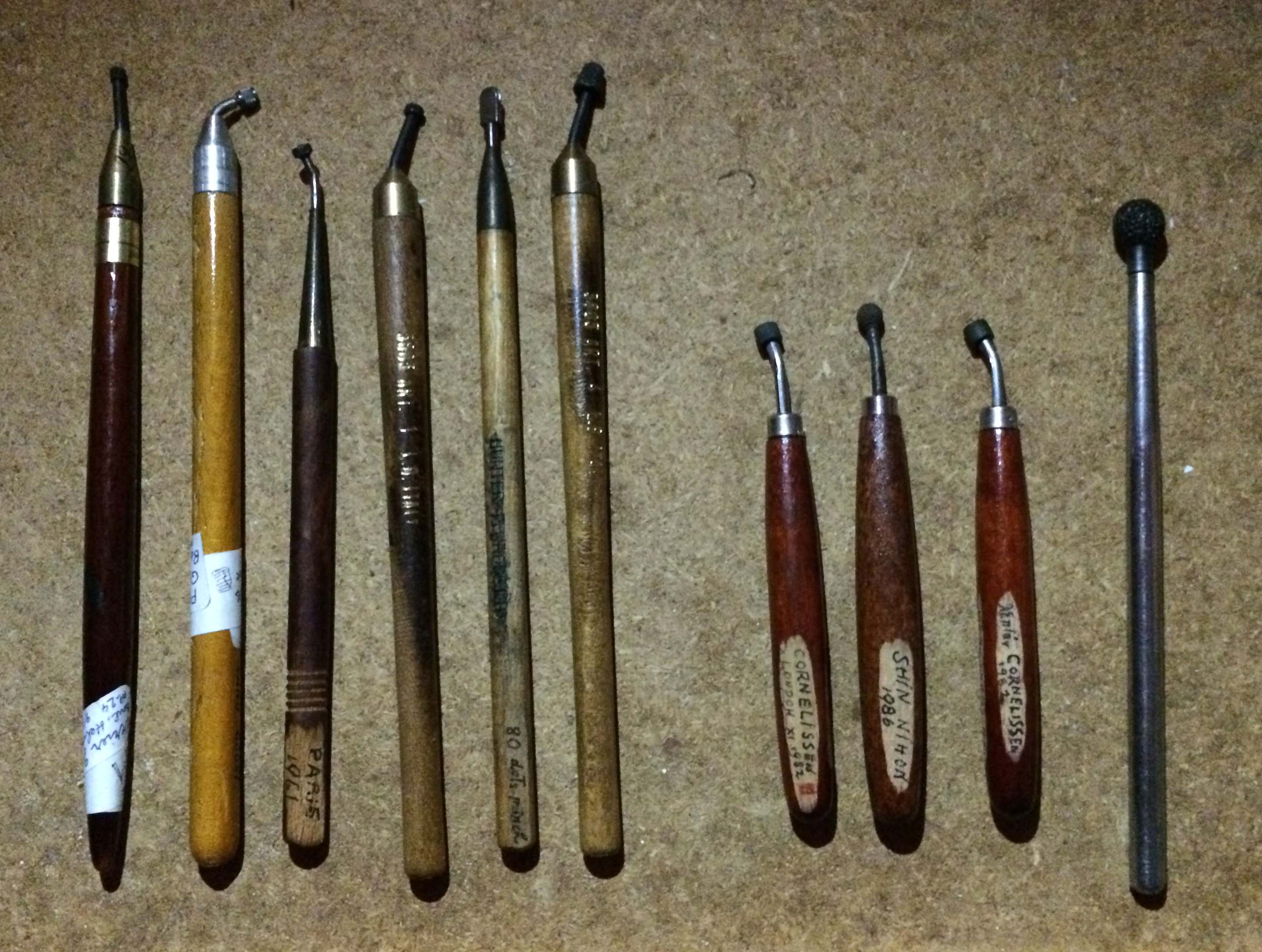
Some of Ventouras' etching tools

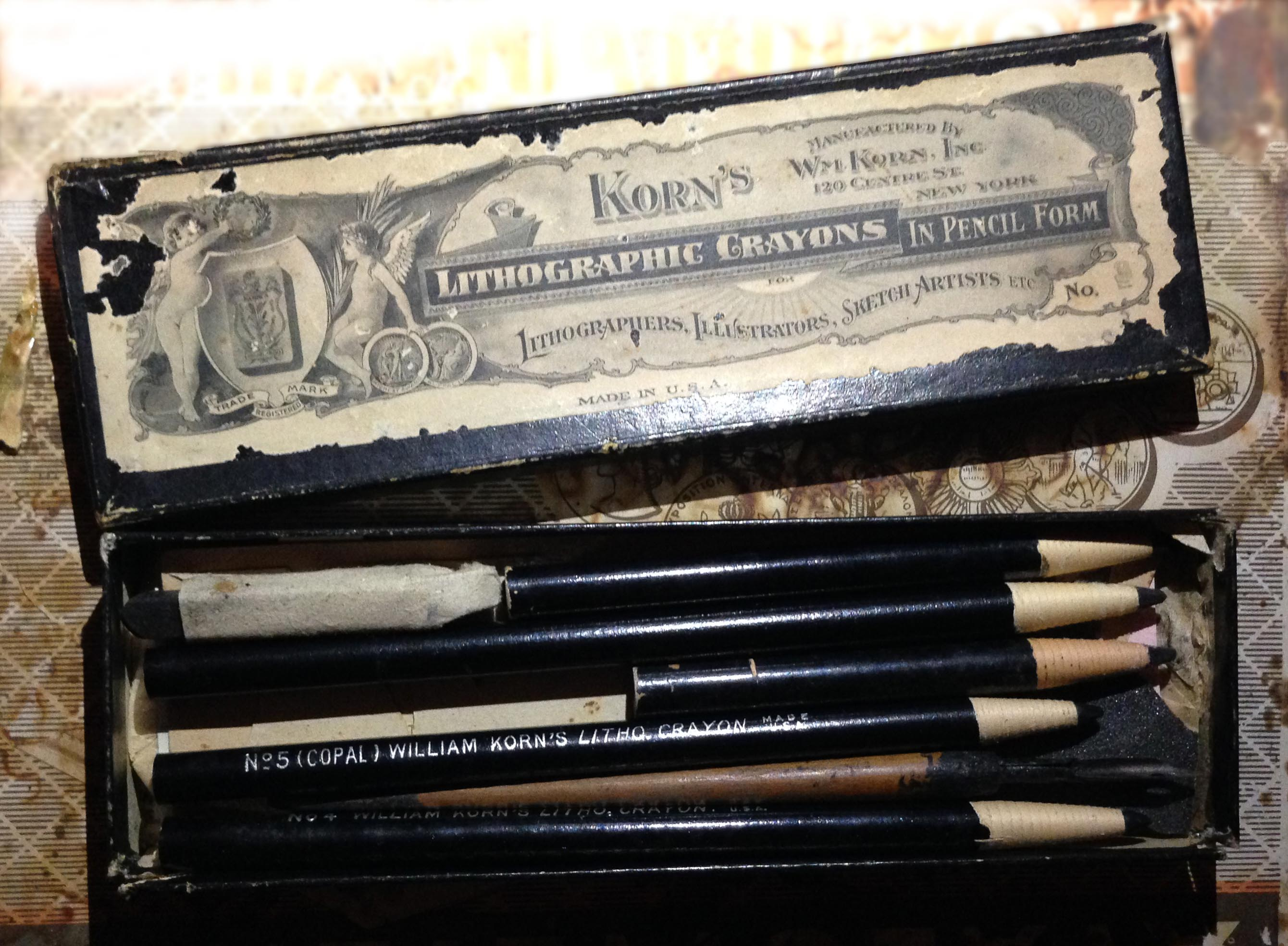
Lithography Pencils

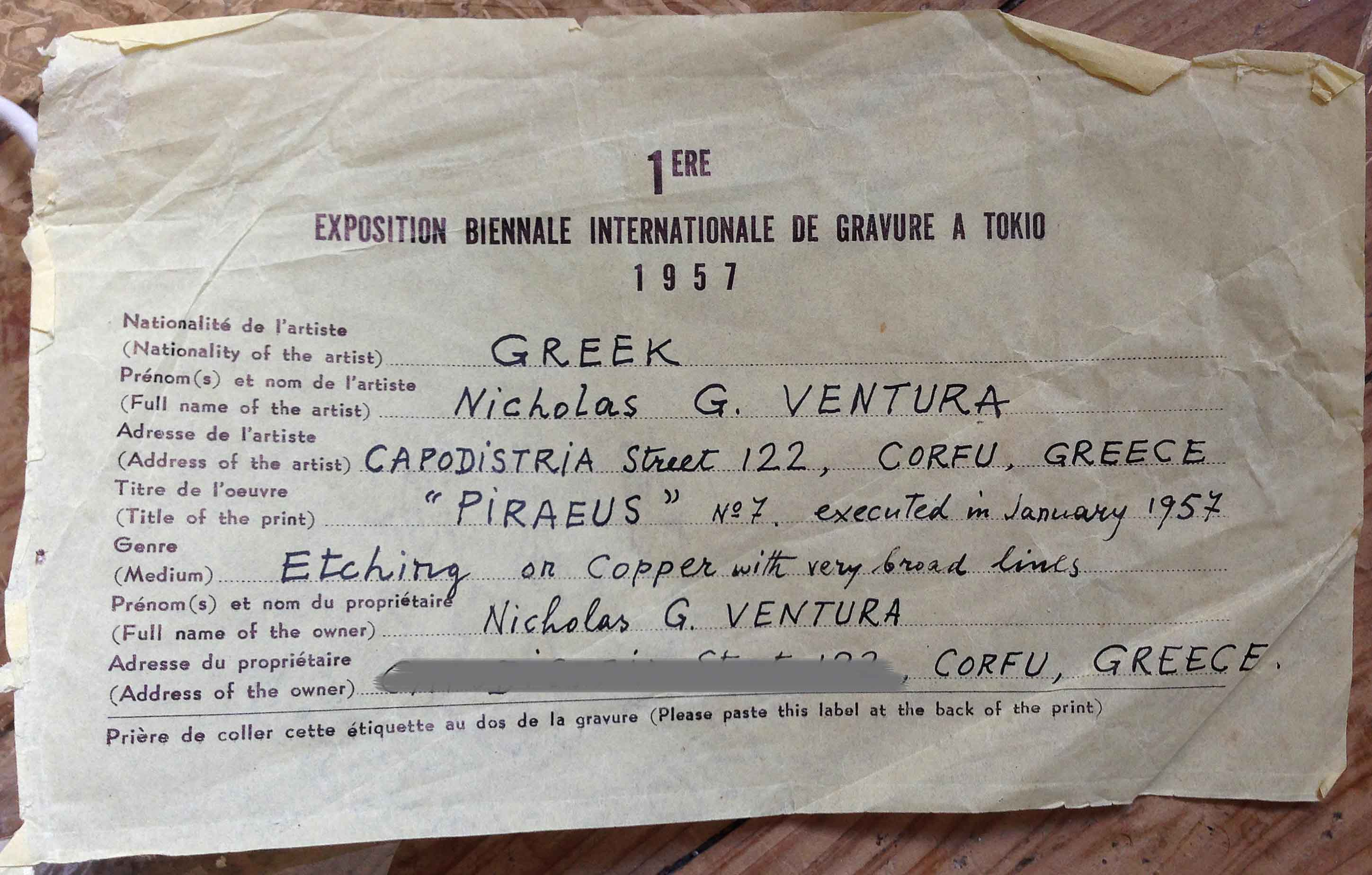
Document accompanying etching print that was exhibited in the 1957 Biennale in Tokyo

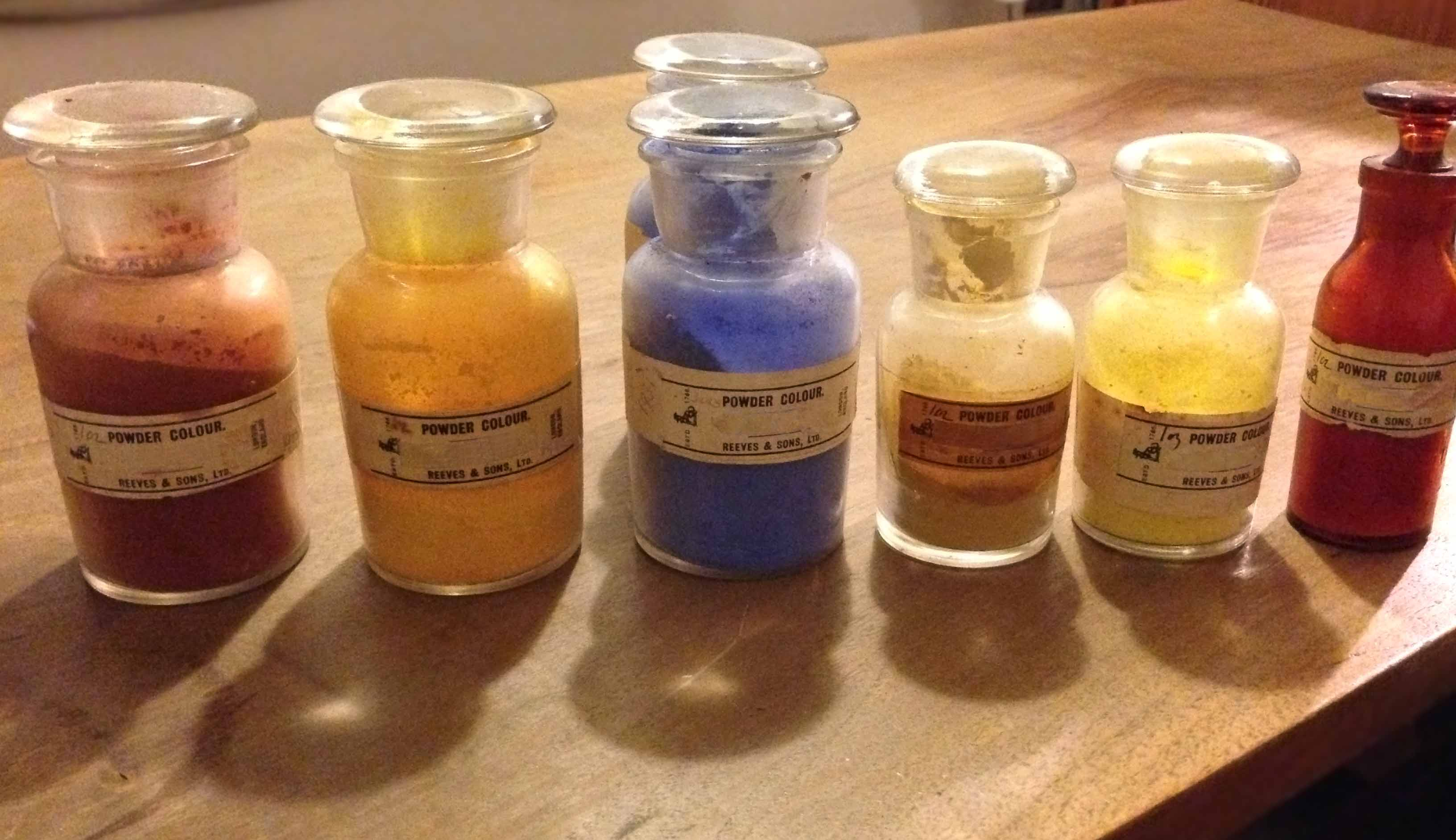
Selection of colours used by Ventouras

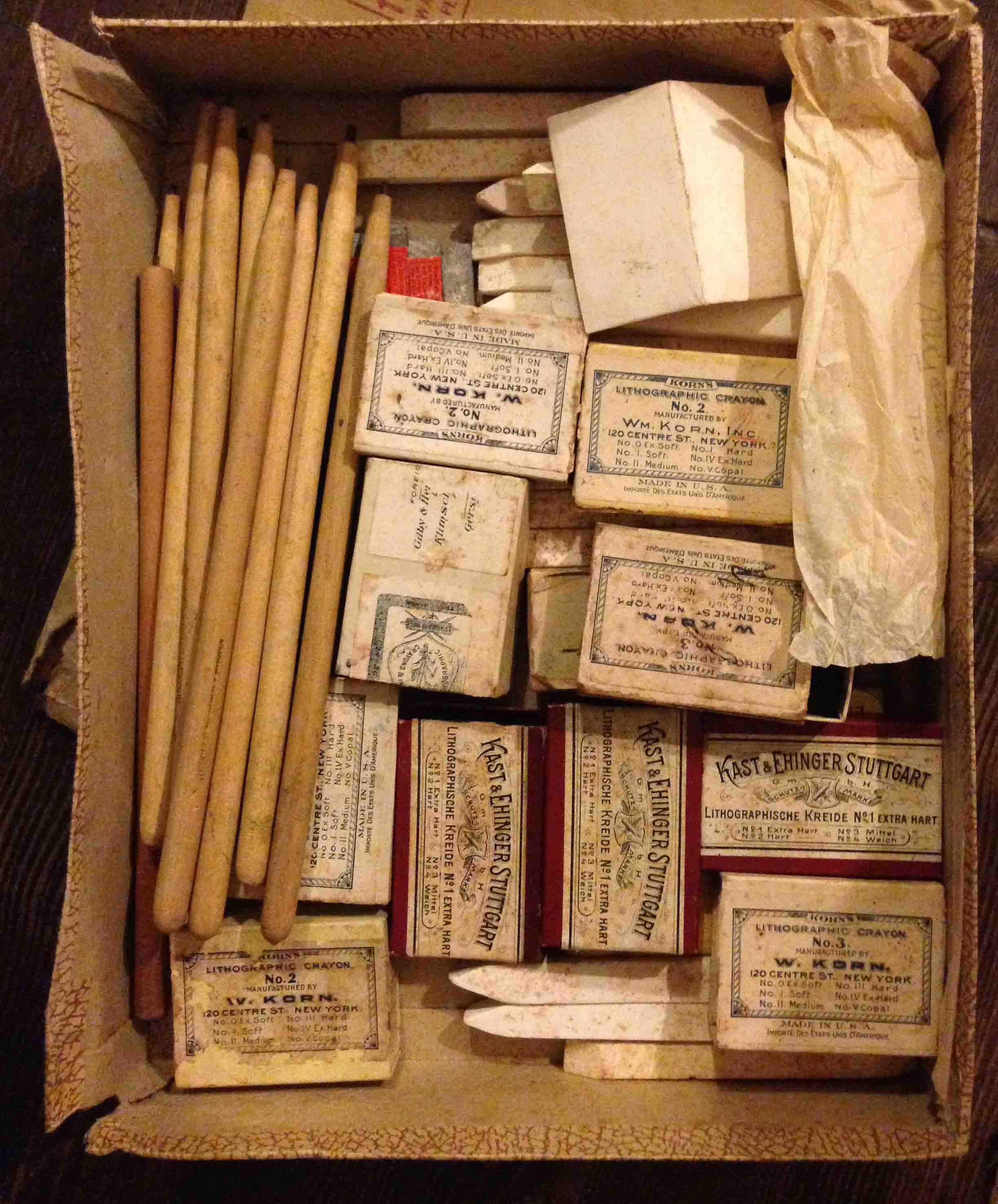
Ventouras' tools

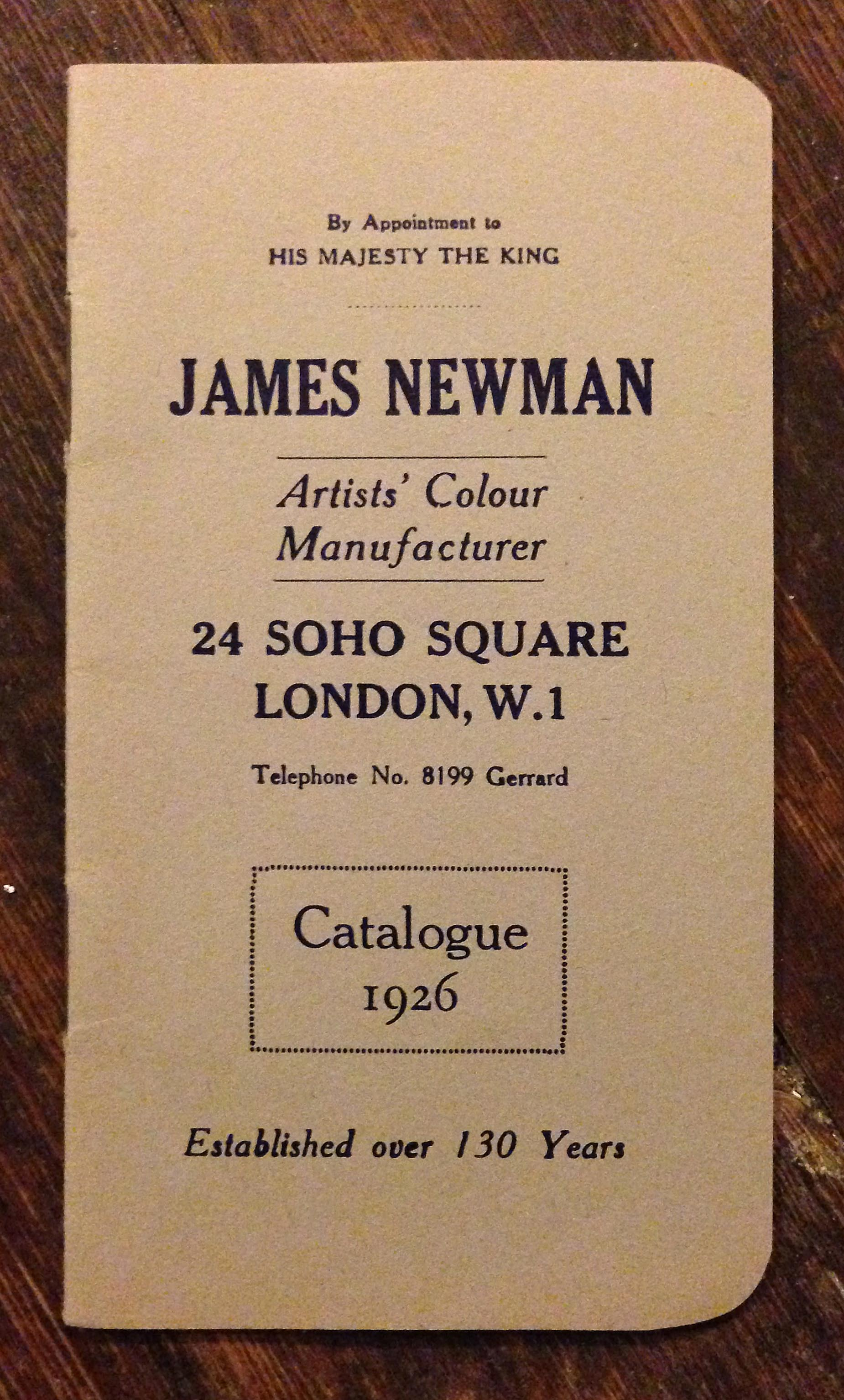
James Newman Artists' Colours Manufacturer, London, 1926

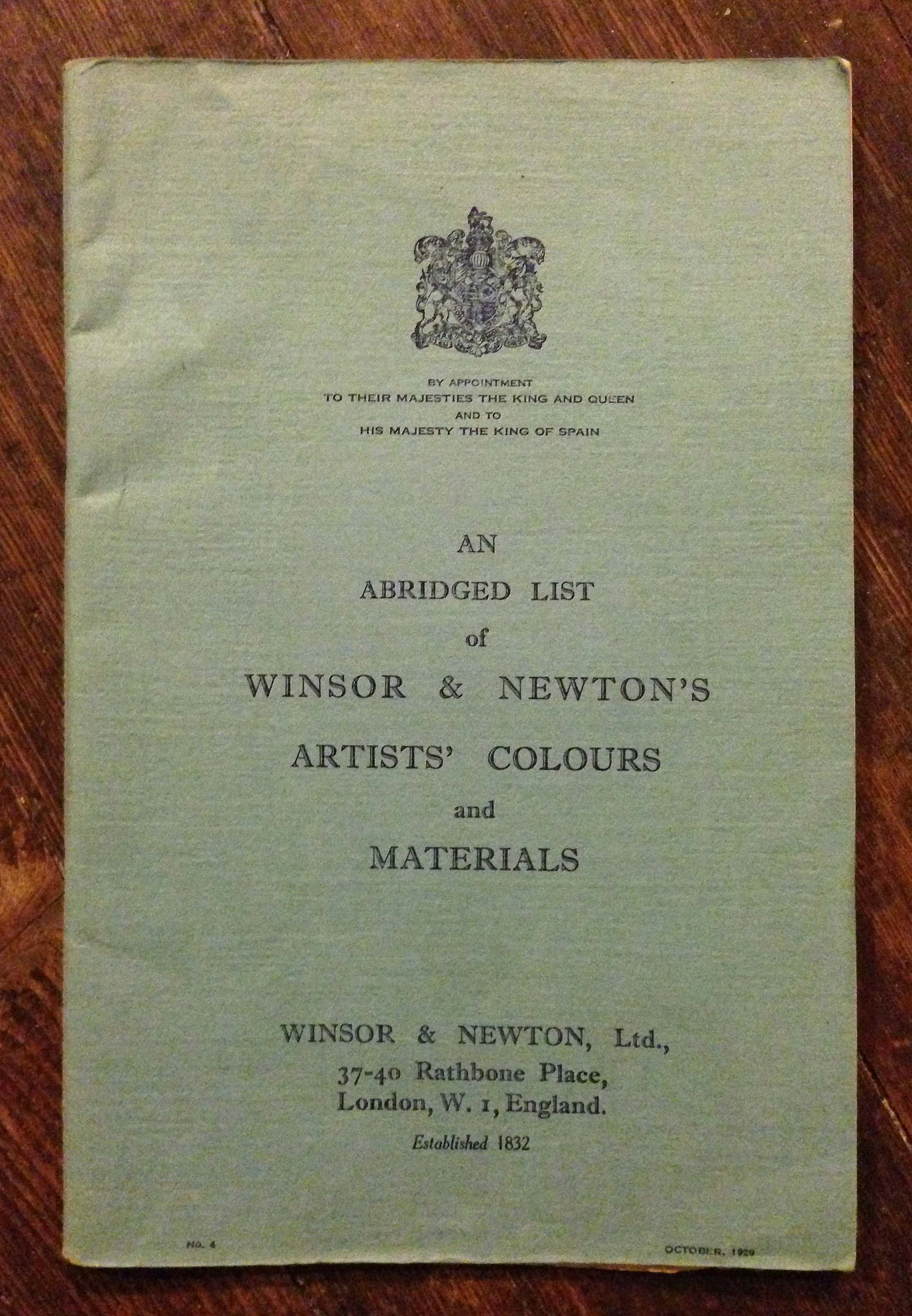
Windsor & Newton's Artists' colours and material, London, 1929

The perfection and meticulousness that characterized him allowed Ventoura to print the same project in different sizes with exactly the same detail. He also figured out a way to print the etchings without pressure marks and even upside down. He was very strict with his work and made notes -in the judgment of quality performance in his own metric ranging from "kachektypon" (misprint) all they through to "exeretikon" (perfect).

== Influences ==
From his first works until 1937, Ventouras, carved landscapes. His work is calm and filled with light; his subjects come from Corfu and Venice.

During the years of the Second World War and immediately after the war, 1945–1948, he flooded his projects with inspiration and expression drawn from post-war ruins, disasters and perspective distortions. His work reveals his psychological state influenced by the historical events. This period can be identified as expressionistic.

1949 to 1950 shows his diversity; few lines, strictly calculated expressing serenity and tranquility, his works are again full of light.

1955 is the year Piraeus changes the scene for Ventouras. He introduces plurality in intercepting forms which, in time, are simplified. He uses, smokestacks, winches and cranes whatever is necessary in the background to complement the harbour, and show how live it is. His lines and some “drops” of color complete his works.

Manolis Hatzidakis in a 1963 speech given at the "Athens Technological Institute" notes: [...] By simplifying things, we would say that we feel to exhale from the work of Mr Ventoura a new lyrical sense of the world ernment so disciplined to laws purely disciplinary. People, landscapes and people, transformed into works of art by a lyrical fantasy goes beyond appearances and things and which found expression within too simple: the search for the essential, and the rejection of unnecessary lent the works of Mr. Ventoura a cleaner spiritual quality. [...]

== His work ==
In 1928, Ventouras illustrated an ethography of Constantine Theotoki "The Life and Death of Karavela", using India ink. The illustration was bought by Vassileiou's publishing house and the relevant printing plates were created. Before these are printed, Vassileiou passed, and the project stopped. Finally, in 1961 his son issued the book with a small number of the drawings as they could not find all of the printing plates.

The prints carry the nickname N. G. Viros (as per Ventouras’ request)

Ventouras worked and was friends with other major Greek artists such as Nikos Hadjikyriakos-Ghikas, Alamanos Spyros and Eleni Vakalo.

He first presented his work in Athens, at the 1948 Panhellenic Art Exhibition in Athens and continued to exhibit his work every year until 1969. Ventouras has participated in individual, group and international exhibitions in Greece and abroad. He also participated at the Biennale of São Paulo (1955,1957), the Alexandria Biennale (1957), the Venice Biennale (1964).

In 1982, four of his prints were added to the British Museum department of Prints and Drawings with the famous Easter procession from the church of St Nicholas being one among them, along his personal favourites, The bend in the road.

Ventouras's first solo exhibition was presented in 1963 at the Athens Institute of Technology. A retrospective exhibition of his work was held a year after his death, in 1991 in Athens. Art Gallery Hyacinth. On May 29, 2016, the “Municipal Art Gallery” in Corfu opens its doors to a retrospective exhibition, in memory of "Nikolaos, Ada and Fanny Ventoura”, and is titled “Persistently Modern”.

The largest retrospective exhibition to date was curated by his grandson and presented at the Piraeus Annex of the Benaki Museum in 2017. It featured over 500 original works of art as well as notes, sketches and studies. It took over 4 years of preparatory work to present this large body of work and was accompanied by a book with a foreword by Martin Royalton-Kisch, until 2009 Senior Curator in the Department of Prints and Drawings of The British Museum.

== Collections ==
- National Gallery
- Alpha Bank
- Municipal Gallery of Corfu
- Heracles GCCo
- British Museum
- Museum of Modern Greek Art, University of Oregon
- Benaki Museum, Nikos Hadjikyriakos-Ghika Gallery

== Exhibitions ==
=== Personal exhibitions ===
- 1963, Athens technological Institute, Athens
- 1981, Gallery Zygos, Athens
- 1986, Yakinthos gallery
- 1991, Yakinthos gallery
- 2016, Municipal Gallery of Corfu
- 2016, Instituto Italiano di Cultura, Athens
- 2017, Benaki Museum

=== Group exhibitions ===
- 1947, "Grekish Konst", Kunglica Akademia foer de Fria Konsterna, Stockholm, Sweden
- 1948, "1st΄ Panhellenic Artistic Exhibition", Zappeion Megaron, Athens, Greece
- 1952, "4th΄ Panhellenic Artistic Exhibition", Zappeion Megaron, Athens, Greece
- 1955, "III Bienal de Sao Paulo", São Paulo Museum of Art, São Paulo, Brazil
- 1955, "La Grece vivante", Geneva, Switzerland
- 1957, "Exhibition of Greek Artists", T.I.F. (Thessaloniki International Fair), Thessaloniki, Greece
- 1957, "IV Bienal de Sao Paulo", São Paulo, Brazil
- 1957, "5th΄ Panhellenic Artistic Exhibition", Zappeion Megaron, Athens, Greece
- 1957, "2nd΄ Mediterranean Artistic Exhibition", Alexandria, Egypt
- 1957, "Biennale Tokyo 1957", Tokyo, Japan
- 1958, "Artistic Group Exhibition "The Workshop", Zygos Art Gallery, Athens, Greece
- 1959, "Artistic Group Exhibition "The Workshop", Exhibit Hall of the American Central Intelligence Agency, Athens, Greece
- 1960, "Group Exhibition", Nees Morfes Art Gallery, Athens, Greece
- 1960, "Painting-Sculpture-Engraving-Decorating", Nees Morfes Art Gallery, Athens, Greece
- 1960, "6th΄ Panhellenic Artistic Exhibition", Zappeion Megaron, Athens, Greece
- 1961, "5th΄ Artistic Group Exhibition "The Workshop", Parnassos Literary Society, Athens, Greece
- 1961, "IV International Biennale of Graphic Art 1961", Museum of Modern Art, Ljubljana, Slovenia
- 1963, "8th΄ Panhellenic Artistic Exhibition", Zappeion Megaron, Athens, Greece
- 1963, "Hellenic Art Exhibition", Belgrade, Serbia
- 1963, "Artistic Group Exhibition "The Workshop": 6th Exhibition, Parnassos Literary Society, Athens, Greece
- 1963, "International Engraving Exhibition", Tokyo, Japan
- 1964, "32 Biennale di Venezia 1964", Venice, Italy
- 1965, "8th΄ Panhellenic Exhibition", Zappeion Megaron, Athens, Greece
- 1967, "9th΄ Panhellenic Artistic Exhibition", Zappeion Megaron, Athens, Greece
- 1969, "Expozitia de Arta Plastica Contemporana din Grecia", Ateneul Roman, Bucuresti, Romania
- 1969, "10th΄ Panhellenic Artistic Exhibition of Painting, Sculpting, Engraving, Decorating", Zappeion Megaron, Athens, Greece
- 1969, "8th Artistic Group Exhibition "The Workshop, Athens Hilton Art Hall, Athens, Greece
- 1971, "Tribute to Greek Engraving, 1972 Calendar", Nees Morfes Art Gallery, Athens, Greece
- 1971, "11th Panhellenic Artistic Exhibition", Zappeion Megaron, Athens, Greece
- 1976, "Panorama of Greek Art 1950–1975", National Art Gallery–Alexandros Soutzos Museum, Athens, Greece
- 1977, "Greek Engraving", Nees Morfes Art Gallery, Athens, Greece
- 1977, "Balkan Exhibition of Friendship", National Art Gallery–Alexandros Soutzos Museum, Athens, Greece
- 1977, "Painting and Engraving of Balkan Countries", Museu de Arts, Bucuresti, Romania
- 1978, "Zeitgenoessische Griechische Malerei und Graphik", Institut fuer Auslandsbeziehungen, Stuttgart, Germany
- 1978, "Modern Greek Artists and Engravers", Hellenic Cultural Center, Nicosia, Cyprus
- 1978, "Engraving Exhibition ", Drama, Greece
- 1980, "18 Greek Engravers", Yakinthos Art Gallery, Kifisia, Athens, Greece
- 1981, "Modern Greek Engraving and Efthymis Papadimitriou", Yakinthos Art Gallery, Kifisia, Athens, Greece
- 1981, "National Bank go Greece Art Collection", National Art Gallery–Alexandros Soutzos Museum, Athens, Greece
- 1983, "Morphoplastic and Technical Research in Greek Engraving 1892–1982", Rhodes Municipal Gallery, Rhodes
- 1985, "Greek Engravers: Rhodes Municipal Gallery Collection", Municipal Art Gallery of Larissa G.I. Katsigras Museum, Larissa, Greece
- 1985, "Memories-Transformations-Searches", National Art Gallery–Alexandros Soutzos Museum, Athens, Greece
- 1985, "Greek Engravers", Athenaeum Art Gallery, Athens, Greece
- 1986, "Summer Lounge", Yakinthos Art Gallery, Kifisia, Athens, Greece
- 1986, "Gravure Exhibition of Greek Artists: Tribute to Goya", Instituto Cervantes Atenas, Athens, Greece
- 1987, "Panhellenic Artistic Exhibition 1987", Piraeus Port Authority Exhibition Centre, Piraeus, Greece
- 1987, "Summer Lounge ΄87", Yakinthos Art Gallery, Kifisia, Athens, Greece
- 1988, "Greek Engraving", Thessaloniki Municipal Gallery, Thessaloniki, Greece
- 1988, "Greek Modern Art: Account of a Collection 1975–1987", National Art Gallery–Alexandros Soutzos Museum, Athens, Greece
- 1988, "Greek Postwar Engraving", National Art Gallery–Alexandros Soutzos Museum, Athens, Greece
- 1988, "Group Exhibition", Yakinthos Art Gallery, Kifisia, Athens, Greece
- 1988, "Β΄ Panionia Visual Arts Exhibition", Corfu Municipal Gallery, Corfu, Greece
- 1989, "Ionian Painters from the 18th to the 20th century", Yakinthos Art Gallery, Kifisia, Athens, Greece
- 1990, "Greek Engravers ", Municipal Gallery of Patras, Patras, Greece
- 1991, "Summer Lounge ΄91", Yakinthos Art Gallery, Kifisia, Athens, Greece
- 1992, "Modern Transformations: The Greek Experience", National Art Gallery–Alexandros Soutzos Museum, Athens, Greece
- 1992, "Artistic proposals", Yakinthos Art Gallery, Kifisia, Athens, Greece
- 1992, "Greek engraving: Section D", Aetopouleio Cultural Center - Library, Chalandri, Athens, Greece
- 1993, "Artistic proposals", Yakinthos Art Gallery, Kifisia, Athens, Greece
- 1994, "Gravures Helleniques Contemporaines", Konschthans Beim Engel, Luxemburg
- 1994, "Greek ex libris by Greek Artists", Yakinthos Art Gallery, Kifisia, Athens, Greece
- 1994, "Summer Lounge ΄94", Yakinthos Art Gallery, Kifisia, Athens, Greece
- 1995, "Engraving Collection of the Ionian Bank", Museum of Cycladic Art, Athens, Greece
- 1995, "Contemporary Greek Engraving", Athens Municipal Gallery, Athens, Greece
- 1995, "Summer Lounge ΄95", Yakinthos Art Gallery, Kifisia, Athens, Greece
- 1996, "Greek Artists 1954–1996", Giorgio de Chirico Art Cultural Center, Volos, Greece
- 1996, "Tribute to Orthodoxy, Section C΄: Greek Engravers Engraved Religious Issues", Yakinthos Art Gallery, Kifisia, Athens, Greece
- 1996, "Summer Lounge 1996", Yakinthos Art Gallery, Kifisia, Athens, Greece
- 1996, "Eleven Masters of Greek Engraving", Hellenic Foundation for Culture, London, United Kingdom
- 1996, "Three Corfiot Engravers", Yakinthos Art Gallery, Kifisia, Athens, Greece
- 1996, "Modern Greek Engraving", X. Leontiadi Collection, Thessaloniki Cultural Capital of Europe 1997, Greece
- 1997, "22 important representatives of modern Greek engraving", Astrolavos Art Gallery, Athens, Greece
- 1999, "Artistic proposals", Yakinthos Art Gallery, Kifisia, Athens, Greece
- 1999, «Modern Greek Engraving – 20th Century, X. Leontiadi Collection » Ministry of Development, Athens, Greece
- 2000, "Lights and Shadows-Panorama of Greek Engraving", Nicosia Municipal Cultural Centre, Nicosia, Cyprus
- 2000, "Lights and Shadows-Panorama of Greek Engraving", National Art Gallery–Alexandros Soutzos Museum, Athens, Greece
- 2000, "Twelve and One Teachers of Modern Greek Engraving", Grigorakis Gallery-Engraving Museum, Psychiko, Athens, Greece
- 2002, "Three Corfiot Engravers: Ventouras-Zavitzianos-Kogevinas", Grigorakis Gallery-Engraving Museum, Psychiko, Athens, Greece
- 2003, "Greek Sculpture-Engraving, Collections by Theodoros Hadjisavvas", Athens Municipal Gallery, Athens, Greece
- 2003, "Greek Engravers in the 20th century", National Bank of Greece Cultural Foundation (Eynard Mansion), Athens, Greece
- 2003, "Art Patron-Cities, Settlements and Neighborhoods in Greek Painting 19th & 20th Century", Touring Exhibit, Athens, Xanthi, Rhodes, Greece
- 2003, "Greek Engravers in the Twentieth Century", Art Space 8, Rethimno, Crete
- 2003, "Island landscapes and ports of Greece", Grigorakis Gallery-Engraving Museum, Psychiko, Athens, Greece
- 2003, "Summer Engravers Lounge 2003 - Engraving Panorama", Grigorakis Gallery-Engraving Museum, Psychiko, Athens, Greece
- 2003, "Lights and Shadows-Panorama of Greek Engraving ", Chania Municipal Gallery, Chania, Crete
- 2003, "Art Patron-Cities, Settlements and Neighborhoods in Greek Painting 19th & 20th Century", Ioannina Municipal Gallery, Ioannina, Greece
- 2004, "Olive Tribute", Academy of Athens, Athens, Greece
- 2004, "Y. Papakonstantinou Collection", Psychiko Municipal Gallery, Psychiko, Athens, Greece
- 2004, "The Ship & the Sea by Greek Engravers", Grigorakis Gallery-Engraving Museum, Psychiko, Athens, Greece
- 2004, "Summer Engravers Lounge 2004 - Πανόραμα Χαρακτικής", Grigorakis Gallery-Engraving Museum, Psychiko, Athens, Greece
- 2005, "Alpha Bank Collection, Painting-Engraving-Sculpture", Benaki Museum Piraeus Street Anex, Athens, Greece
- 2005, "Ports of Hellenism. Greek Limenography", Contemporary Art Center of Thessaloniki, Warehouse B1-Thessaloniki Port, Thessaloniki, Greece
- 2005, "The Olive Tree from Greek Engravers", Grigorakis Gallery-Engraving Museum, Psychiko, Athens, Greece
- 2005, "Summer Engravers Lounge 2005 - Πανόραμα Χαρακτικής", Grigorakis Gallery-Engraving Museum, Psychiko, Athens, Greece
- 2006, "Alpha Bank Collection: Greek Art from 1920 until today", MOMus-Museum of Contemporary Art, Thessaloniki, Greece
- 2006, "Olive Tribute", United Nations, New York, United States of America
- 2006, "Summer Engravers Lounge 2006 - Engraving Panorama", Grigorakis Gallery-Engraving Museum, Psychiko, Athens, Greece
- 2006, "Pioneers and Teachers of Modern Greek Engraving", Grigorakis Gallery-Engraving Museum, Psychiko, Athens, Greece
- 2007, "Olive Tribute", SPAP Olympia Conference and Exhibition Centre, Ancient Olympia, Olympia, Greece
- 2007, "Summer Engravers Lounge 2007 - Engraving Panorama", Grigorakis Gallery-Engraving Museum, Psychiko, Athens, Greece
- 2008, "Panorama of Greek Engraving", Technopolis (Gazi), Athens, Greece
- 2008, "Summer Engravers Lounge 2008 - Engraving Panorama", Grigorakis Gallery-Engraving Museum, Psychiko, Athens, Greece
- 2009, "Pioneers-Teachers and engravers of the 20th century ", Piraeus Municipal Gallery, Piraeus, Greece
- 2009, "The Human Form in Art", Technopolis (Gazi), Athens, Greece
- 2009, "Impressions on paper", Piraeus Municipal Gallery, Piraeus, Greece
- 2009, "The modern Greek landscape from the 18th to the 21st century: Vision, experience and renovation of the space", B. & M. Theocharakis Foundation, Athens, Greece
- 2009, "1st Athens Engraving Festival", Various Spaces in Athens, Greece
- 2009, "100 Years of Modern Greek Engraving (1909–2009) - Y. Papakonstantinou Collection", Society for Macedonian Studies, Thessaloniki, Greece
- 2009, "Greeks engraved", Ersi's Gallery, Athens, Greece
- 2009, "Summer Engravers Lounge 2009 - Engraving Panorama", Grigorakis Gallery-Engraving Museum, Psychiko, Athens, Greece
- 2010, "Summer Engravers Lounge 2010 - Engraving Panorama", Grigorakis Gallery-Engraving Museum, Psychiko, Athens, Greece
- 2011, "Greek Painters in the Calendars of HERACLES General Cement Company 1956–2009", Benaki Museum, Athens, Greece
- 2013, "Classic and modern Greek engraving 1930–1950", Modern Archives, Cholargos, Athens, Greece
- 2014, "Art in Europe after 1945: Beyond Borders ", MOMus-Museum of Contemporary Art, Thessaloniki, Greece
- 2014, "Modern Greek Printmaking from the Y. Papakonstantinou Collection", 12 Star Gallery, Europe House, London, United Kingdom
