= Telloglou =

Telloglou (Greek: Τέλλογλου) is a Greek surname. Notable people with the surname include:

- Nestoras Telloglou (died 1972), Greek businessman
- Tasos Telloglou (born 1961), Greek investigative journalist
