= Emmanuel Zairis =

Greek painter

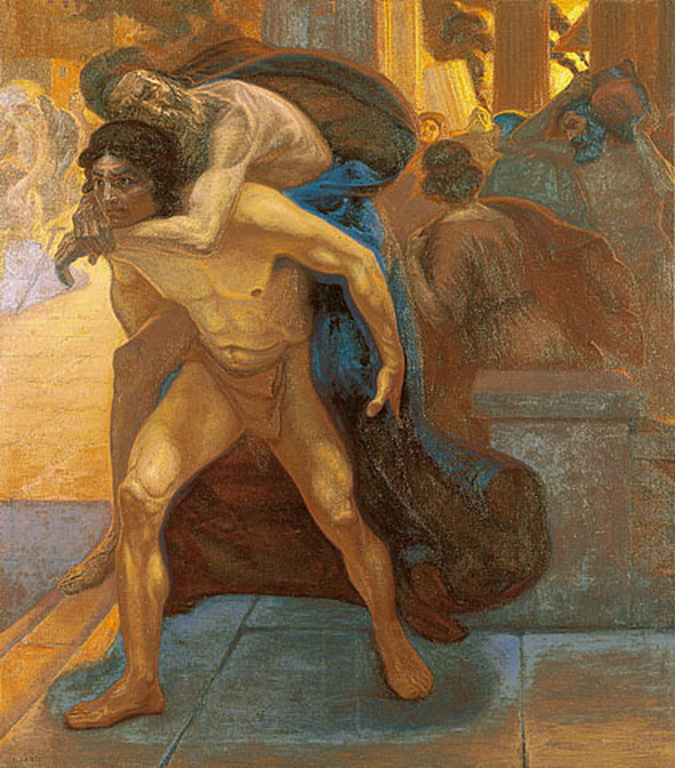
Aeneas saves his father through the flames of Troy.

Emmanuel Zairis (Greek: Εμμανουήλ Ζαΐρης; 1876 or 1878 – 1948) was a Greek painter.

== Biography ==
Zairis was born in 1876 or 1878 in Bodrum, Ottoman Empire, but no information is available about his early years. In 1894 he left for Bavaria to study at the Munich Academy of Fine Arts, where he was a student of Nikolaos Gyzis. After completing his studies, he remained in Germany. From 1904 to 1930 Zairis took part in 22 exhibitions at the Glaspalast in Munich. During the 1913 exhibition he won the gold medal and in 1921 a retrospective exhibition of his works was organized in Munich. In search of his own style he lived for a time in Paris.

Having spent several years abroad, he decided to return permanently to Greece. In 1932 he was appointed director of the branch of the Athens School of Fine Arts in Mykonos. In 1934, another retrospective exhibition of Zairis' works was organized at the Zappeion Hall in Athens, where more than 250 of his works were exhibited. Zairis took part in the Panhellenic Art Exhibitions of 1938, 1939 and 1940 and the Venice Biennale of 1936. He died in Mykonos in 1948.

In his works, Zairis mainly depicted working people with the aim of social reflection, but also painted landscapes and portraits to a lesser extent. He quickly moved away from the principles of the Munich Academy and the principles of ethnography and began to paint following the style of realism. He was also influenced by German Impressionism, which is evident in the colours of his work.

Zairis artworks are exhibited in the National Gallery of Greece and in other galleries and private collections (Municipal Gallery of Ioannina, Averoff Gallery, Teloglion Foundation of Arts, Kouvoutsakis Gallery, etc.).

== Gallery ==
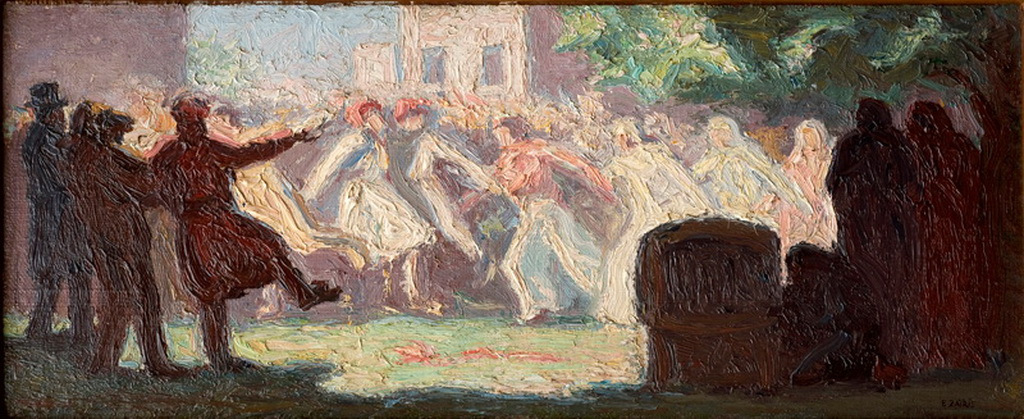
The carnival in Athens

Girl in a cabbage field

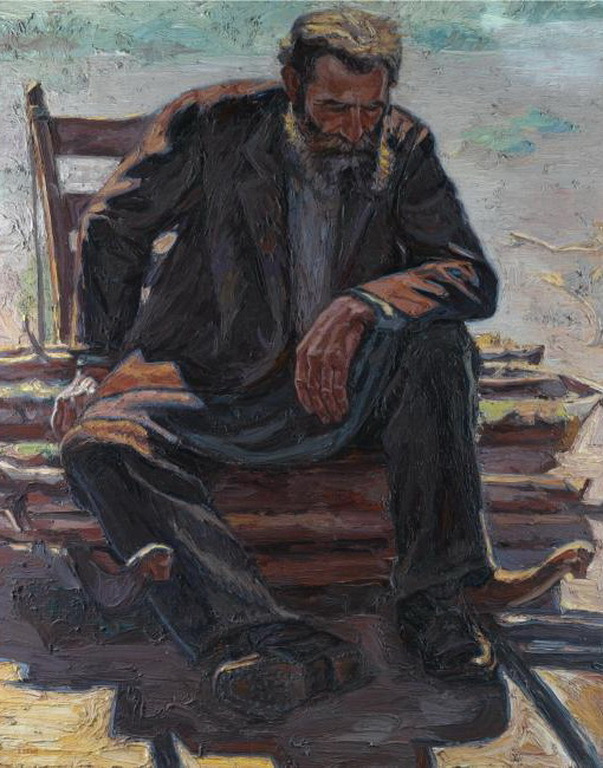
A moment's rest
