= Jeanne Spiteris =

Greek sculptor (1920–2000)

Jeanne Spiteris or Ioanna Spiteri or Ioanna Veropoulou-Spiteri (Greek: Ιωάννα Βεροπούλου - Σπητέρη; 1920–2000) was a Greek post-war sculptor and a representative of Expressionism.

== Biography ==
Born in Athens as Ioanna Veropoulou, she was originally from Smyrna. She married the art critic Tony Spiteris in 1941. She studied law at the University of Athens and later sculpture at the Athens School of Fine Arts (1947-1952) under the prominent sculptor Michael Tombros. Between 1958 and 1963 she lived in Venice and for the next thirteen years in Paris. Since 1976 Spiteris has lived and worked between Athens and Paris. Her studio was designed in 1957 by Aristomenis Provelenghios, an associate of Le Corbusier. It later served as a home, studio space and exhibition space for other artists and "trailblazers."

Her first solo exhibition was held in 1960, followed by many others in Greece and abroad. She participated in exhibitions such as Greek Artists (New York, 1958), the Salon des Realites Nouvelles (1963, 1965) and the 8th Biennale of São Paulo (1963). During the 1980s, Spiteris and her husband donated their archives, books but also many of her artworks to the Teloglion Foundation of Arts in Thessaloniki. She died in Athens in 2000.

Her apprenticeship with Tombros and her stay abroad influenced her artistic style. She is classified as an expressionist artist, with obvious influences from Cubism (French Cubisme) in her early works. Her later work is characterised by a preference for strictly structured geometric forms and a love of the play of light shading created by natural light on the material. She worked mainly in metal. Her sculptures were often monumental and can be found in public spaces in Greece and France. Another aspect of her work was designing costumes for theatrical performances.

== Collections ==
Spiteris' work is held in the permanent collections of the National Gallery of Greece, the Teloglion Foundation of Arts, the Museum of Contemporary Art in Skopje etc.

== Bibliography ==
- Συλλογικό έργο (2006). Εθνική Γλυπτοθήκη, Μόνιμη Συλλογή. Athens: National Gallery. p. 254.
