= Teloglion Fine Arts Foundation =

Coordinates: 40.6327°N 22.9607°E

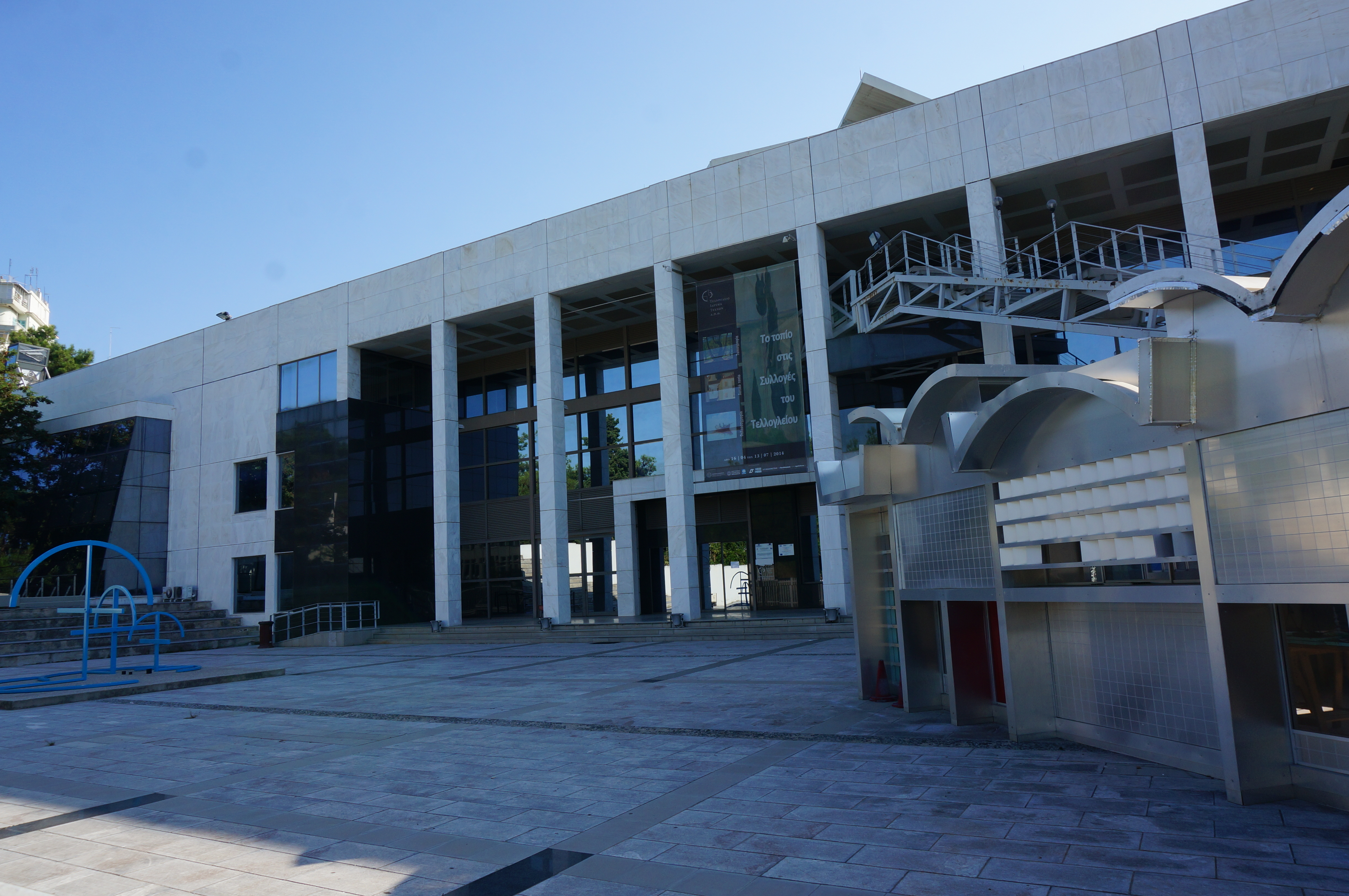
- Established: 1972
- Location: Agiou Dimitriou 159A, 54636 Thessaloniki
- Type: Art Museum
- Website: www.teloglion.gr

The Teloglion Fine Arts Foundation (formerly known in English as Teloglion Foundation of Art; Greek: Τελλόγλειο Ίδρυμα Τεχνών) is an art museum located in Thessaloniki, Central Macedonia, Greece.

== History ==
It was established in 1972 and it was named after Nestor and Aliki Telloglou, who donated their art collection and their entire property to the Aristotle University of Thessaloniki. Following the donation, the university established the foundation in order to house the art collection and make it available to the public. Since December 1999, the foundation has been installed in a modern building at the upper part of the Aristotle University of Thessaloniki campus.

== Information ==
Teloglion Fine Arts Foundation is a non-profit organisation supervised by the Aristotle University of Thessaloniki and directed by a board of trustees, composed of university's professors from various faculties.Foundation's primary mission is to familiarize the public with art and culture and to support research and studies about arts. Furthermore, the foundation organizes conferences and seminars, supporting in this way the cooperation with other similar institutions in Greece and abroad. Its collection comes from donations of Telloglou and various individuals. It contains numerous artworks mainly of Greek but also and European artists of the 19th and 20th centuries.

== Facilities ==
Teloglion is housed in a 6,500 square meter building located at the northern side of the Aristotle University of Thessaloniki campus. The site where the building is situated was granted by the Municipality of Thessaloniki.

The exhibition area covers three floors and a total area of 2,500 square meters. It is subdivided into smaller independent areas and a small number of auxiliary rooms. The levels of temperature, relative humidity and light inside the exhibition area are closely and constantly monitored through the use of a state-of-the-art system, which controls the environmental conditions in the whole building.

The foundation also owns a medium-sized amphitheater, which is a fully equipped conventional center, able to host a great variety of cultural and scientific events, such as musical events, seminars, lectures and conferences. The amphitheater holds 230 seats and is equipped with advanced megaphone installations, a control room and three independent translation booths.

== Art collection ==
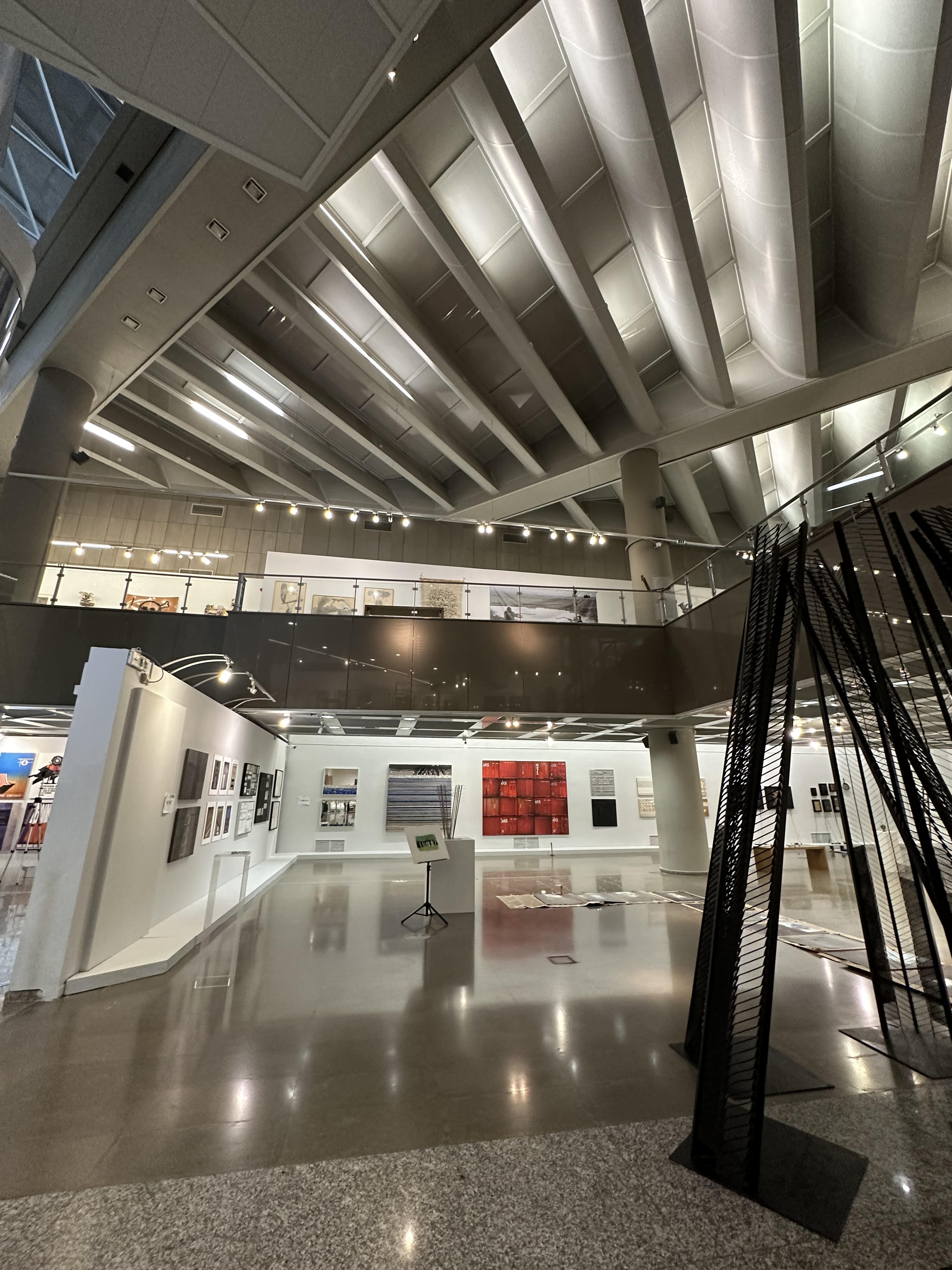
Art exhibition in Teloglion (2023)

Nestor's and Aliki's Telloglou donation is the core of the museum's art collection which numbers about 7,000–8,000 exhibits. The main body of the collection includes works of art by important Greek and European artists of the 19th and 20th century (drawings, prints, oil on canvas, sculptures and so on). It also includes artworks from various civilizations: Hellenistic and Roman pottery, statues, especially from the Hellenistic period, samples of Chinese and Arabic art (dishes, vases, etc.), Persian miniatures and a variety of woodreliefs from Thailand.

Later the collection was enriched with various donations from artists and art lovers such as Tonis and Ioanna Spiteris, Demetrios Tsamis and many more. Thus today the collection of the Teloglion Fine Arts Foundation possesses artworks from the most important Greek artists of the 19th century and the beginning of the 20th century, such as works from Gyzis, Jakobides, Parthenis, Spyropoulos, Engonopoulos, Mytaras and many others.

Notable artists (painters, engravers, sculptors) include the following:

=== Heptanese School ===
- Nikolaos Kantounis
- Nikolaos Koutouzis
- Spyridon Prosalentis
- Nikolaos Xydias Typaldos

=== Munich School ===
- Ioannis Altamouras
- Thalia Flora-Karavia
- Nikolaos Gyzis
- Georgios Jakobides
- Georgios Roilos

=== Early 20th century & Generation of the '30s ===
- George Bouzianis
- Nicos Engonopoulos
- Giorgos Gounaropoulos
- Nikos Hadjikyriakos-Ghikas
- Photis Kontoglou
- Konstantinos Parthenis
- Yannis Tsarouchis
- Mimis Vitsoris
- Emmanuel Zairis

=== Modern & Contemporary ===
- Koula Bekiari
- Costas Koulentianos
- Dimitris Mytaras
- Giorgos Sikeliotis
- Yiannis Spyropoulos
- Tassos
- Panayiotis Tetsis
- Loukas Venetoulias

=== European artists ===
- Ivan Aivazovsky
- François Boucher
- Marino Marini
- Henri Félix Philippoteaux
- Salvator Rosa
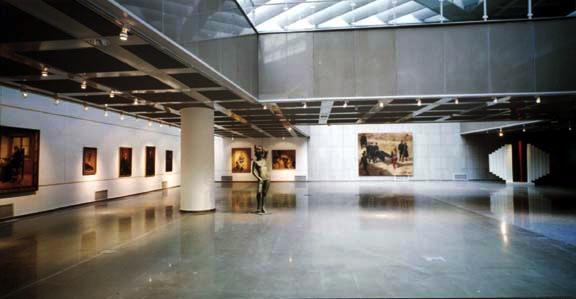
Internal view 1

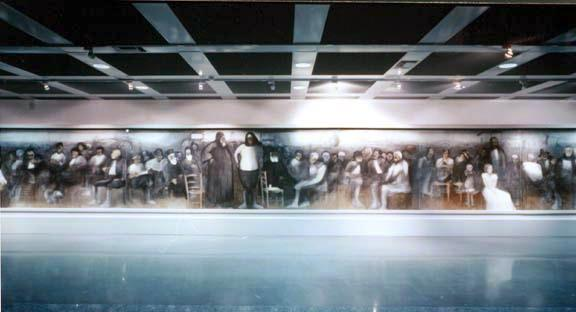
Interior view 2

== See also ==
- Aristotle University of Thessaloniki
- Thessaloniki
- List of museums in Greece
