= Mimis Vitsoris =

Greek Expressionist painter and sculptor

Dimitris or Mimis Vitsoris (Greek: Μίμης Βιτσώρης; 1902–1945) was a Greek Expressionist painter and sculptor.

== Biography ==
Vitsoris was born in Thessaloniki in 1902. After the death of his father, his family moved to Athens in 1911 where as an adult he enrolled at the Athens School of Fine Arts. He did not complete his studies, however, because he disagreed with the school's educational philosophy and came into conflict with the professors. His first solo exhibition was held when he was at the age of 18. Later Vitsoris left Athens and travelled to Europe (Italy, Germany and France successively), where he studied the various trends in painting. He stayed in Paris and collaborated with the magazine Le Petit Parisien (The Little Parisian), where he published his sketches. He fell seriously ill and went to Malta in 1925, where he produced some of his sketches.

He returned to Greece in 1927 and began to paint portraits and landscapes, which, together with his religious paintings, became his main subject matter. His sculptures consist of clay and plaster heads. He collaborated with newspapers and magazines in Athens while also illustrating books. In 1930, together with other important artists of his time, he participated in the founding of the Omada Techni (Ομάδα Τέχνη). Since then he has participated in many exhibitions in Greece and other European countries. His works can be found at the National Gallery of Greece, the Municipal Gallery of Larissa and the Teloglion Foundation in Thessaloniki. In addition to painting, Vitsoris also wrote several studies and books about art.

He died on 29 January 1945 in Athens, devastated by the death of his brother and mother.

== Bibliography ==
- Lambraki-Plaka, Marina· Karakourti-Orphanopoulou, Lambrini, επιμ. (2020). Η ανθρώπινη μορφή στην ελληνική ζωγραφική, 20ός αιώνας. Athens: Theocharakis Foundation. p. 15. ISBN 978-618-5201-10-4
