= Loukas Venetoulias =

Loukas Venetoulias (Greek: Λουκάς Βενετούλιας; 1930–1984) was a Greek painter.

== Biography ==
Venetoulias was born in 1930 in Thessaloniki, where he took his first painting lessons from Nikos Gavriel Pentzikis. Initially a student of medicine, he later switched to Arts and trained at the Athens School of Fine Arts (1954 to 1958) under the direction of Yannis Moralis and Spyros Papaloukas. His first solo exhibition was held in 1964. He organized about a dozen solo exhibitions in Thessaloniki and Athens and participated in various group exhibitions in Greece and abroad (US, Canada, Cyprus etc.). In 1971 he received a scholarship from the Ford Foundation. He died in 1984. Since his death, retrospective exhibitions of his works were held mainly in Thessaloniki.

The urban landscape of his birthplace is the main motif of Venetoulias' work although during the period of the Greek junta, human figure appeared to a greater extent than the previous years. After 1974 he created a series of works in and about Santorini and also worked on still life.

Venetoulias paintings can be found at the National Gallery of Greece, the Municipal Gallery of Thessaloniki, the Municipal Gallery of Larissa, MOMus, the Teloglion Foundation of Arts, the Macedonian Artistic Society "Techni", the Ministry of Macedonia and Thrace and in private collections.

== Bibliography ==
- Κομίνη-Διαλέτη, Δώρα· Ματθιόπουλος, Ευγένιος Δ (1997). Λεξικό Ελλήνων Καλλιτεχνών:Ζωγράφοι, γλύπτες, χαράκτες, 16ος-20ός αιώνας. Καλλιτεχνική βιβλιοθήκη. 1. Athens: MELISSA Publishing House. pp. 170–2. ISBN 978-960-204-034-8
- Λυδάκης, Στέλιος (1976). Οι Έλληνες ζωγράφοι, Λεξικό των Ελλήνων ζωγράφων και χαρακτών. Καλλιτεχνική βιβλιοθήκη. 4. Athens: MELISSA Publishing House. p. 51.
