= Pandelis Prevelakis =

Greek novelist, poet, dramatist and essayist

Pandelis Prevelakis (Greek: Παντελής Πρεβελάκης, sometimes transliterated Panteles Prevelakes; 18 February 1909 – 15 March 1986) was a Greek novelist, poet, dramatist and essayist—one of the leading Greek prose writers of the "Generation of the '30s". Most of his works are set in Crete.

== Biography ==
He was born in Rethymno, in Crete, on 18 February 1909. He studied philology in Paris and Thessaloniki.

From about 1930 he was a friend and agent of the novelist and poet Nikos Kazantzakis, and eventually wrote a biography of him.

In 1938 he brought out what is probably his best-known work, The Tale of a Town or The Chronicle of a Town (Το χρονικό μιας Πολιτείας, 1937), a nostalgic depiction of Rethymno from 1898 to 1924.

From 1939 to 1975 he was a professor of art history in the Academy of Arts, Athens. In 1939 he brought out a historical story, The Death of the Medici.

After World War II appeared his Wretched Crete: a chronicle of the rising of 1866 (1945); which was followed by the trilogy, The Cretan (1948–1950) (revised edition 1965), which refers to events between 1866 and 1910 and introduces historical characters such as Venizelos. In 1959 he brought out The Sun of Death, in which a boy comes to terms with human mortality.

He also wrote four plays, all based on historical themes.

Prevelakis died in Ekali, Attica on 15 March 1986. His grave is in Rethymno, in a churchyard near the top of the hill on Kazantzakis Street. There is a statue of him in front of Rethymno's City Hall.

== Translations ==
- Le soleil de la mort (1997)
- The Cretan, tr. A. Rick, P. Mackridge (1991)
- The Tale of a Town, tr. K. Johnstone (1976)
- The Sun of Death, tr. Philip Sherrard (1965)

== Sources ==
- Antonis Dekavalles (Αντώνης Δεκαβάλλες), Εισαγωγή στο λογοτεχνικό έργο του Παντελή Πρεβελάκη, Κέδρος, 1985. (in Greek)
