= Giorgos Sikeliotis =

Greek artist (1917–1984)

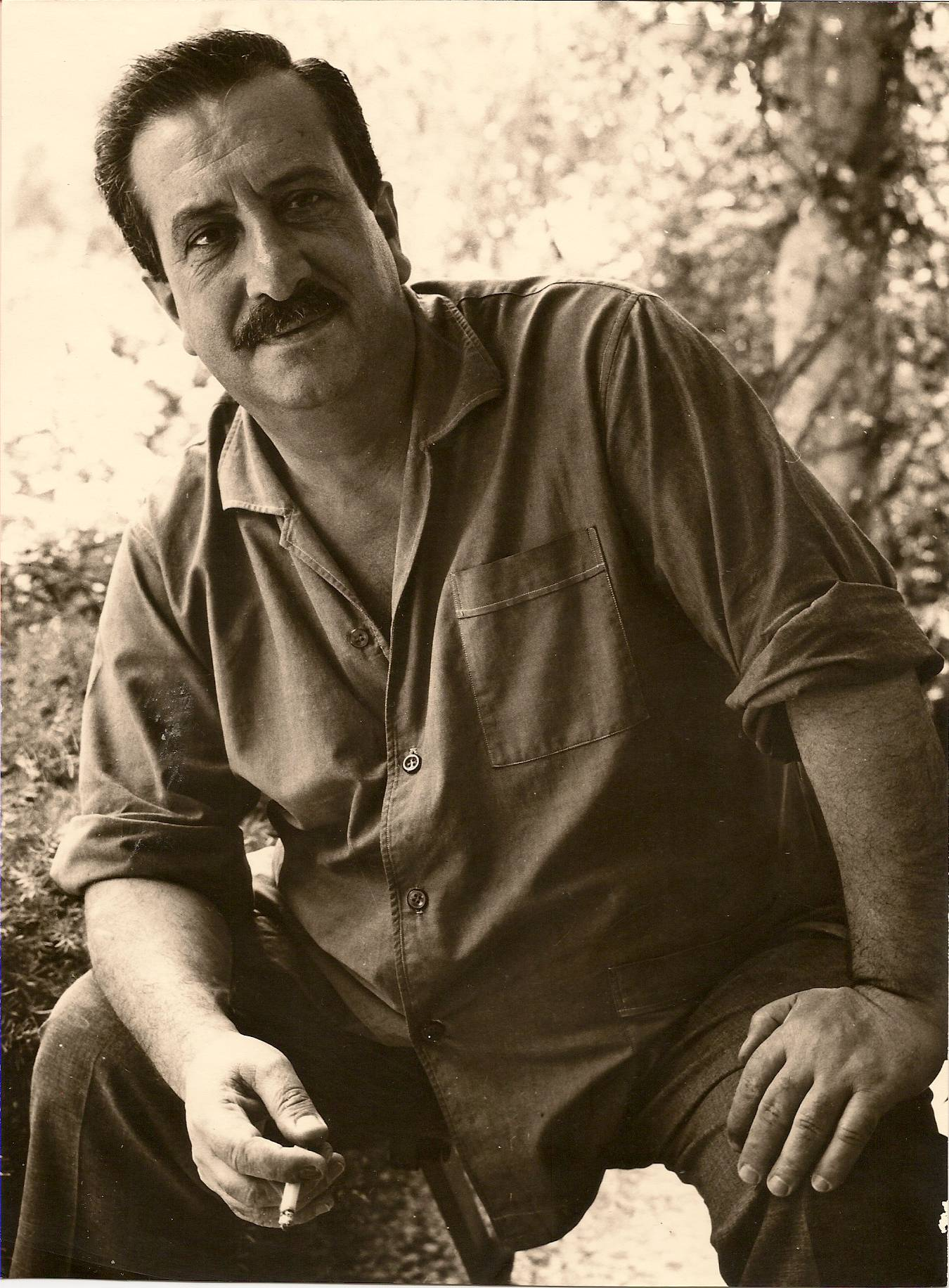
Sikeliotis 1

Giorgos Sikeliotis (1917-1984) was a Greek painter and engraver. He is considered a member of the "Generation of the '30s".

== Biography ==
Born in Smyrna in 1917 he settled to Greece with his family after his birthplace was retaken and razed by the Turkish Army during the Greco-Turkish War (1919–1922). He grew up in Kaisariani, Athens. In 1939 he graduated from the Athens School of Fine Arts (ASKT), where he was taught by Parthenis and Vikatos.

His first solo exhibition was in 1954 in the lobby of To Vima. From then until his death in Athens in 1984, he took part in many group exhibitions in Greece and abroad, including Ottawa, Rome, Toronto, Montreal, Alexandria, Helsinki and New York City, where he had a solo exhibition in 1965 and was nominated for a Guggenheim award.

Works of Sikeliotis are to be seen in the National Gallery of Athens and the Municipal Art Gallery of Rhodes. Others are in New York, bought by the World House Gallery, and in many other private collections in Greece and abroad.
