= Panhellenic Art Exhibition =

The Panhellenic Art Exhibition was a periodic art exhibit in the 20th century Greece that passed through four ditinct phases:

- at the beginning of the century, under the name Panhellenic Exhibition of the Association of Greek Artists (1910–1916),
- from 1938 to 1940, the first annual Panhellenic Exhibition organized by the Ministry of Education, but due to World War II, the exhibition resumed post-war,
- from 1948 to 1975, as the "quintessential post-war art event".
- In 1987, during the tenure of Melina Mercouri as minister of culture.

The exhibition took place at the Zappeion Hall in Athens and was organized by the Greek state (the Ministry of Education, Religious Affairs and Sports until 1971 and the Ministry of Culture in 1973 and 1975), while the 1987 exhibition was held at the Piraeus Port Authority Exhibition Center.

== The exhibitions ==
=== Pre-war ===
- 1st Panhellenic Art Exhibition, 1938, President of the Organizing and Judging Committee was G. Oikonomou, vice-president was Kostis Bastias, and general secretary was P. Prevelakis
- 2nd Panhellenic Art Exhibition (Zappeion Hall, March and April 1939), President of the Organizing and Judging Committee was Kostis Bastias and general secretary was P. Prevelakis
- 3rd Panhellenic Art Exhibition, May 1940

=== Post-war ===
- 1948 1st Panhellenic Art Exhibition
- 1952 4th Panhellenic Art Exhibition
- 1957 5th Panhellenic Art Exhibition
- 1960 6th Panhellenic Art Exhibition
- 1963 7th Panhellenic Art Exhibition
- 1965 8th Panhellenic Art Exhibition
- 1967 9th Panhellenic Art Exhibition
- 1969 10th Panhellenic Art Exhibition
- 1971 11th Panhellenic Art Exhibition (08/04/1971)
- 1973 12th Panhellenic Art Exhibition
- 1975 13th Panhellenic Art Exhibition

The institution was discontinued after the Metapolitefsi (Greek transition to democracy) period.

A similar exhibition was organized in 1987 during the tenure of Melina Mercouri:

- 1987 Panhellenic Art Exhibition '87 at the Piraeus Port Authority Exhibition Center

A revival of the institution was announced for the organization of a Panhellenic Visual Arts Exhibition in 2008.

== Sources ==
- Matthiopoulos, Eugenios D., ed. (2022). Ο θεσμός της Πανελλήνιας Καλλιτεχνικής Έκθεσης, 1938-1987 [The Institution of Panhellenic Art Exhibitions, 1938-1987] (in Greek). Athens: IMS-ITE; Melissa Publishing House.
