= Nestoras Telloglou =

Greek businessman

- Νέστορας or Νέστωρ Τέλλογλου
- Born: Greece
- Died: 1972
- Occupation(s): Businessman, art collector
- Spouse: Aliki Telloglou (m. 1953)

Nestoras Telloglou (Greek: Νέστορας or Νέστωρ Τέλλογλου; d. 1972) was a Greek businessman, art collector and benefactor.

== Early life ==
Born in Smyrna, Telloglou was the scion of a wealthy local Greek family, which fled to Thessaloniki after the Greco-Turkish War (1919–1922). He studied in Switzerland and subsequently went into business in Thessaloniki. In 1953 he married Aliki Orologa (later known as Aliki Telloglou).

== Art collection ==
In the following years until the end of his life, he created together with his wife an important art collection, which includes paintings, objects of the Hellenistic and Roman period, small works of art, folk and traditional art from various regions of the world, etc. The couple later donated their collection, as well as substantial sums of money, to the Aristotle University of Thessaloniki, which in 1972 established the Telloglion Foundation.

== Death and legacy ==
Telloglou died in the summer of 1972.

For his contribution Nestoras Telloglou is honoured as a benefactor of the Aristotle University of Thessaloniki. Also the Thessaloniki Municipality has named a street after him.
