= Aliki Telloglou =

Greek art collector and philanthropist

Aliki Telloglou (Greek: Αλίκη Τέλλογλου; d. June 23, 2008), née Aliki Orologa (Αλίκη Ωρολογά), was a Greek art collector and philanthropist.

== Biography ==
Aliki Orologa was born in Thessaloniki, Greece, to Naoum and Lucia Orologas, both of whom were refugees from Istanbul and Bitola, respectively. Despite her desire to study interior architecture, she eventually studied medicine without ever completing it. In 1953, she married Nestoras Telloglou, a businessman and art collector of Smyrniote Greek origin, and dedicated her life to collecting art with him, under the ultimate goal of establishing an art museum, through the donation of their entire property to the Aristotle University of Thessaloniki. The couple created an important art collection, which includes paintings, objects of the Hellenistic and Roman period, small works of art, folk and traditional art from various regions of the world, etc.

Officially, the museum was established in 1972, under the name Teloglion Fine Arts Foundation, just few months before Nestoras' death. In 1999 the museum was officially inaugurated after long efforts made by Telloglou. It is located in an adjacent area to the campus of the Aristotle University of Thessaloniki, donated by the Municipality of Thessaloniki. Telloglou died on June 23, 2008, in Thessaloniki.

Her sister is Lilika Zerva-Orologa, a scholar and mother of Konstantinos Zervas, Mayor of Thessaloniki from 2019 to 2023. The apartment in which Aliki Teloglou lived after her marriage in the Olympion Building was converted into a house museum.
