= Stefanos Sinos =

Greek architect, academic, and writer

- Στέφανος Σίνος
- Born: c. 1937; Athens
- Education: Karlsruhe Institute of Technology
- Occupations: Architect, civil engineer, professor, university teacher
- Notable work: The Late Byzantine Palace of Mystras and its Restoration

Stefanos Sinos (Greek: Στέφανος Σίνος) is a Greek architect, preservationist, and professor at the National Technical University of Athens. He was the chair of the scientific restoration committee which oversaw the restoration of the Byzantine World Heritage site at Mystras.

== Early life and education ==
Stefanos Sinos was born in Athens. In 1954, when he was 17 years old, Sinos first visited Mystras and was amazed to find "an entire palace, in a state which seemed [...] wild and dangerous," although the Late Byzantine fortified hill town had been partially restored by Anastasios Orlandos in 1937–39. Sinos knew he wanted to participate in further restoration at the site. He studied at the Technical University of Munich and the Karlsruhe Institute of Technology (KIT), graduating from the latter in 1962 with a degree in architecture, and in 1967, a doctoral degree in engineering. During this time, he also served as assistant to the departmental chair of the History of Architecture at KIT.

== Career ==
In 1970 he became an assistant professor and taught the history and theory of architecture. In the 1970s he supervised a program of the National Technical University, where students went to Cypriot villages to record and study the traditional architecture. Among the villages recorded were Kakopetria, Fikardou, Pano Lefkara and Omodos. From 1972 until 1985, he was a professor of architectural morphology and rhythm at the National Technical University of Athens.

In the 1980s, he was invited by Vassos Karageorghis, then director of the Department of Antiquities, Cyprus, to study the temple of Apollo Hylates at Kourion with the aim of restoring parts of the temple. The subsequent restoration project, in collaboration with the department, lasted between 1983 and 1986.

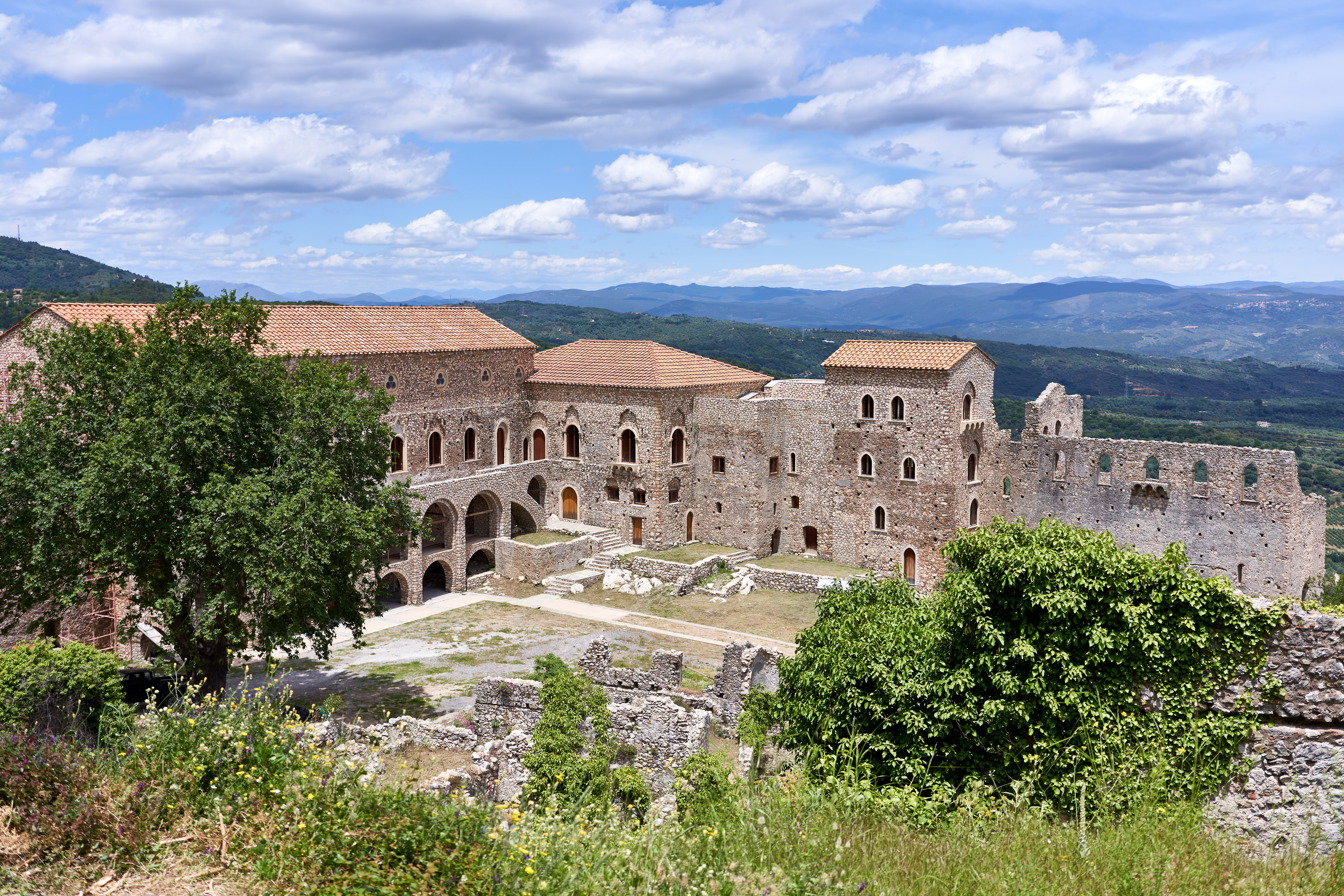
View of the Palace of Mystras (2019)

From 1984 he was a member of the Working Group for the Restoration of the Monuments of Mystras and then he assumed the chairmanship of the Commission for the Restoration of Mystras Monuments of the Ministry of Culture, a position he holds until today. The restoration work in Mystras began in 1989 and was finalised in 2015, it was the first restoration work carried out on the site after some rescue restorations done by Anastasios Orlandos in 1937–1939. Sinos also contributed to the study of Byzantine architecture in Greece, he was the supervisor of the "Committee for the Restoration of Mystras Monuments".

His book, The Late Byzantine Palace of Mystras and Its Restoration, which Sinos wrote in English "in order to address the international scientific community", was published in 2021. The book documents "the architectural history of the Byzantine Palace of the Despots, its original remains, the studies done, and the restoration works and the techniques used" covering his involvement in the UNESCO World Heritage site dating back to his first visit as a 17 year old in 1954.

== Publications ==
- Σίνος, Σ. (1976). Αναδρομή στη Λαϊκή Αρχιτεκτονική της Κύπρου [A look back at the Folk Architecture of Cyprus]. Athens: Makris.
- Sinos, Stefanos (1980). The folk architecture and art of Cyprus. Boca Raton: CRC Press, Inc.
- Sinos, S. (1984). The restoration of rural architectural monuments in Cyprus. Report of the Department of Antiquities, Cyprus, 354–374.
- Sinos, S. (1986). Types of Rural Dwellings in Cyprus. In V. Karageorghis (Ed.), Acts of the International Archaeological Symposium "Cyprus between the Orient and the Occident," Nicosia, 8–14 September 1985. Department of Antiquities, Cyprus.
- Sinos, S. (1987). Organisation und Form des byzantinischen Palastes von Mystras, Architectura, 17, 105–128.
- Sinos S. (1988). The Patsalos House at Lefkara, The Rescue of a Traditional Building and the Planning of a Museum. Report of the Department of Antiquities, Cyprus. (Part 2): 265–273.
- Sinos, S. (1990). The Temple of Apollo Hylates at Kourion and the Restoration of Its South – West Corner. Athens: Α.G. Leventis Foundation.
- Sinos, S. (1999). Mistras, RbK, 6, 380–518.
- Σίνος, Σ. (2009). Τα Μνημεία του Μυστρά: Το έργο της Επιτροπής Αναστήλωσης Μνημείων Μυστρά – The Monuments of Mystras: The work of the Communittee for the Restoration of the Monuments of Mystras. Αθήνα: Ταμείο Διαχείρισης Πιστώσεων για την Εκτέλεση Αρχαιολογικών Έργων.
- Σίνος, Στέφανος (March 2012). Θεωρεία και πράξη στην προ-μοντέρνα αρχιτεκτονική [Theory and practice in pre-modern architecture] (in Greek). Athens: Εκδόσεις Πατάκη [Patakis Publications]. ISBN 9789601641980.
- Σίνος, Σ. (2013). Η αρχιτεκτονική του καθολικού της Μονής της Παντάνασσας του Μυστρά. The architecture of the katholikon of the Monastery of Pantanassa in Mystras. Αθήνα: Πατάκης.
- Σίνος, Στέφανος (2013). Η αρχιτεκτονική του Καθολικού της Μονής της Παντάνασσας του Μυστρά (in Greek). Athens: Εκδόσεις Πατάκη [Patakis Publications].
- Sinos, Stefanos (2021). The Late Byzantine Palace of Mystras and its Restoration. Athens: Kapon Editions. ISBN 978-618-5209-72-8.

== See also ==
- Anastasios Orlandos
- Georgios Sotiriou
- Emmanouil Korres
