= St. Mary Peribleptos =

St. Mary Peribleptos, Theotokos Peribleptos and Panagia Peribleptos is a common dedication of Byzantine-era monasteries to the Virgin Mary. It may refer to:

- Peribleptos Monastery, Mystras
- Monastery of the Virgin Peribleptos in Thessaloniki, nowadays identified with the Church of St. Panteleimon, Thessaloniki
- Church of the Theotokos Peribleptos, Constantinople
- Church of St. Mary Peribleptos, Ohrid
