= Anastasios Orlandos =

Greek archaeologist and architect (1887–1979)

- Αναστάσιος Ορλάνδος
- Born: 23 December 1887; Athens, Kingdom of Greece
- Died: 6 October 1979 (aged 91); Athens, Greece
- Education: National Technical University of Athens; National and Kapodistrian University of Athens
- Relatives: Ioannis Orlandos
- Scientific career
- Fields: History
- Workplaces: National Technical University of Athens; Academy of Athens; Archaeological Society of Athens

Anastasios Orlandos (Greek: Αναστάσιος Ορλάνδος, 23 December 1887 – 6 October 1979) was a Greek architect and historian of architecture.

== Biography ==
A descendant of Ioannis Orlandos, Anastasios was born and died in Athens. He studied as a civil engineer in the National Technical University of Athens, and completed his studies in archaeology at the University of Athens, where he later served as a professor. He was among the leading researchers in ancient Greek, Roman and Byzantine architecture, and responsible for the restoration of many ancient and medieval monuments throughout the country. He was also chairman of the Academy of Athens in 1950, and from 1951 until his death secretary of the Archaeological Society of Athens.

== Publications ==
- Το αέτωμα του εν Σουνίω ναού του Ποσειδώνος, Αρχαιολογικόν Δελτίον, 1, 1915, 1-27.
- Ο εν στρατώ της Ακαρνανίας ναός του Διός, 1924.
- Μοναστηριακή αρχιτεκτονική, 1927, 2nd Edition 1958.
- Παλαιοχριστιανικαί βασιλικαί της Λέσβου, Πρακτικά της Ακαδημίας Αθηνών, 1928, 322-331.
- Το βαπτιστήριον της Κώ, Πρακτικά της Ακαδημίας Αθηνών, 1928, 441-444.
- Η παλαιοχριστιανική βασιλικη των Δαφνουσίων της Λοκρίδος, Πρακτικά της Ακαδημίας Αθηνών, 1929, 226-231.
- Η αρχιτεκτονική του τζαμιού Οσμάν Σάχ των Τρικκάλων, Πρακτικά της Ακαδημίας Αθηνών, 1929, 319-325.
- Monuments byzantines de Chios, 1930.
- Η παλαιοχριστιανική βασιλική της Γλυφάδας, Πρακτικά της Ακαδημίας Αθηνών, 1930, 258-265.
- Μεσαιωνικά μνημεία της πεδιάδος των Αθηνών και των κλιτυών Υμηττού – Πεντελικού, Πάρνηθος και Αιγάλεω, 1933
- Η Βασιλική των Κεγρεών, Πρακτικά της Ακαδημίας Αθηνών, 1935, 55-57.
- Συμβολή στη βυζαντινή αρχιτεκτονική, 1937.
- Ο προορισμός του βορείως του Ωρολογίου Ανδρονίκου του Κυρρήστου ρωμαϊκού κτίσματος, Πρακτικά της Ακαδημίας Αθηνών, 1940, 251-260.
- Αρχείον των βυζαντινών μνημείων της Ελλάδος. 12 volumes, 1937–1973.
- Αισθητική ανάλυσις του Δωρικού ναού και ειδικώτερον του Παρθενώνος, Πρακτικά της Ακαδημίας Αθηνών, 1950, 544-560.
- Η ξυλόστεγος παλαιοχριστιανική βασιλική της μεσογειακής λεκάνης. 3 volumes, 1952–1954
- Τα υλικά δομής των αρχαίων Ελλήνων και οι τρόποι εφαρμογής αυτών κατά τους συγγραφείς, τας επιγραφάς και τα μνημεία, 1955
- Η Παρηγορήτισσα της Άρτης, 1963.
- Τι ήταν οι άβακες των Ρωμαϊκων Θεάτρων;, Πρακτικά της Ακαδημίας Αθηνών, 1963, 479-490.
- Les matériaux de construction et la technique architecturale des anciens Grecs. 2 volumes, de Boccard, Paris 1966–1968.
- Νέον Επίγραμμα του δευτέρου π.χ. αιώνος εκ Ρόδου (Κατάλογος Επιγραφών Μουσείου Ρόδου αρ.567), Πρακτικά της Ακαδημίας Αθηνών, 1976, 830-838.
- Η αρχιτεκτονική του Παρθενώνος, 3 volumes, 1977.
- Λεξικόν αρχαίων ελληνικών αρχιτεκτονικών όρων, 1986.

== See also ==
- Stefanos Sinos – Greek architect, academic, and writer
- Georgios Sotiriou – Greek archaeologist and academic (1880–1965)
- Emmanouil Korres
