= Hagia Sophia, Mystras =

Byzantine church in Mystras, Greece

Hagia Sophia Αγία Σοφία
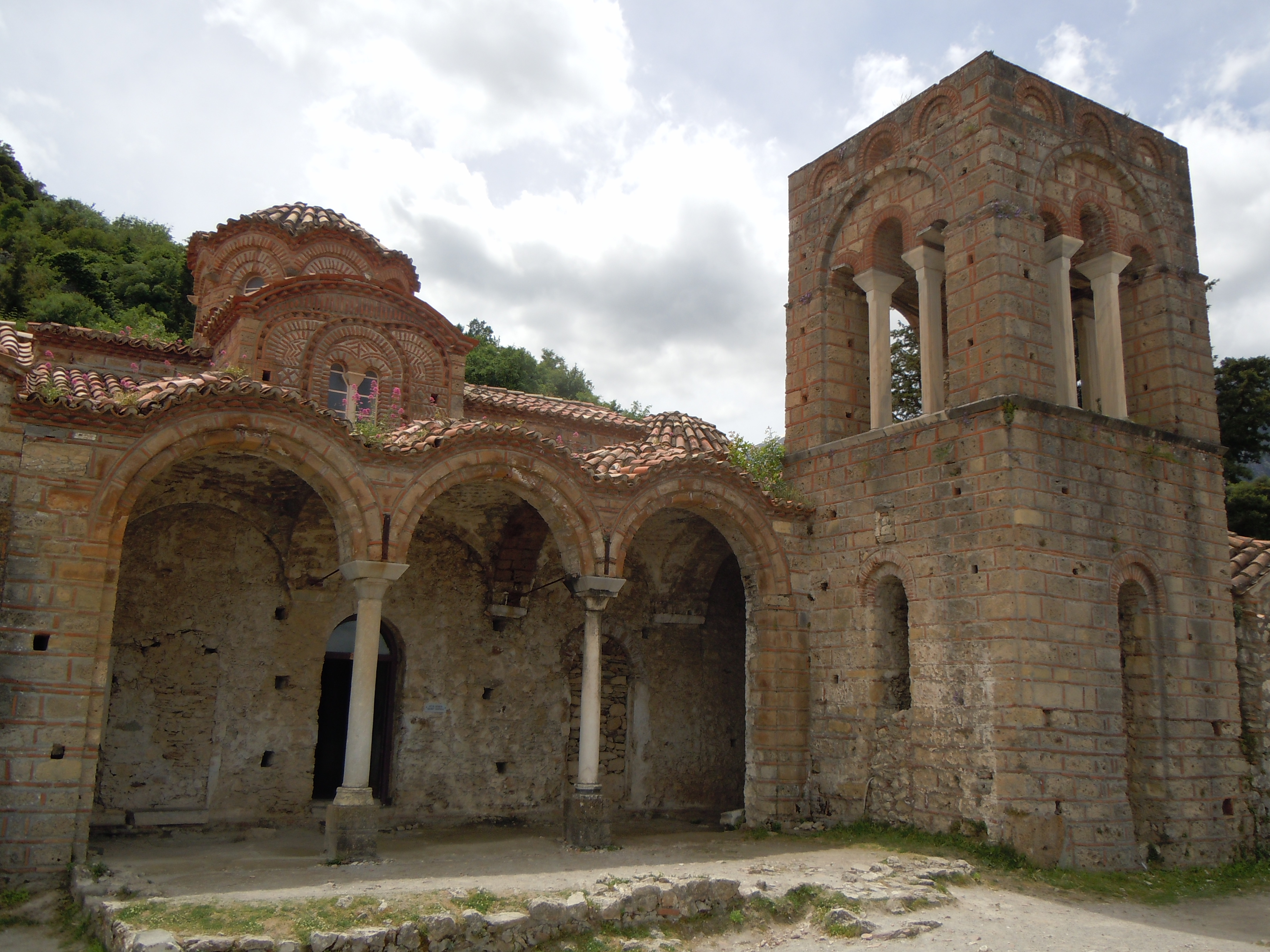

- Location within Greece
- 37°4′25″N 22°21′57″E
- Location: Laconia, Peloponnese
- Country: Greece
- Denomination: Greek Orthodox

Architecture
- Architectural type: Byzantine
- Completed: 14th century

Administration
- Metropolis: Monemvasia and Sparta

UNESCO World Heritage Site
- Official name: Archaeological Site of Mystras
- Criteria: Cultural: ii, iii, iv
- Reference: 511
- Inscription: 1989 (13th Session)
- Area: 54.43 ha (134.5 acres)
- Buffer zone: 1,202.52 ha (2,971.5 acres)

The Church of Hagia Sophia (Ancient Greek: Ἁγία Σοφία, romanized: Hagía Sophía, lit. 'Holy Wisdom' Greek pronunciation: [aˈʝia soˈfia]) or Holy Wisdom is a Byzantine church in the fortified medieval town of Mystras, Peloponnese, Greece. It forms part of the wider archaeological site of Mystras, which is designated as a World Heritage Site by UNESCO. Built within the palace complex, it functioned as the royal palace church until Ottoman conquest of Mystras and its conversion into a mosque. Hagia Sophia of Mystras was made back into a Christian church when Greece achieved independence during the early nineteenth century.

== History ==
Hagia Sophia was built in the fourteenth century by the first despot of Mystras, Manuel Kantakouzenos, whose monograms are preserved on marble plaques of the church. The church was originally dedicated to Jesus Christ the Life Giver (Ancient Greek: Ζωοδότης Χριστός, romanized: Zoodotes Christos) and was the catholicon of the men's monastery, bearing the same name, as can be seen from the seal of the Patriarch of Constantinople Philotheus, from the year 1365, with which it was converted into a monastery at the request of the founder himself. According to several sources, after 1429 the bones of the wife of Constantine XI Palaiologos, Theodora Tocco, were transferred to the monastery, while Cleopa Malatesta, the wife of the despot Theodore II Palaiologos, was also buried there in 1433. The church being renamed to Hagia Sophia must have taken place after the Fall of Constantinople. During Ottoman period, Hagia Sophia, like many other churches in the former Byzantine Empire that fell to the Ottomans, was converted into a mosque.

Upon Greece's independence in 1830, it was converted back into a church. In 1989 Hagia Sophia along with the rest of the ruins, fortress, palace, churches, and monasteries of Mystras, was named a UNESCO World Heritage Site.

== Structure ==
=== Architecture ===
For the most part, Hagia Sophia is built with the brick-enclosed masonry system that is common in southern Greece. The monument belongs to the architectural type of the two-style cruciform church inscribed with a dome, sporting three three-sided external apses to the east, a narthex to the west and two arcades to the north and west, out of which only the first and the northern part of the second are preserved. Contemporary with it is the burial chapel with the underground crypt to the east of the north portico, the three-storey bell tower to the west and the former two-storey altar to the north-west of the church, while the three chapels on its south side are later additions. Hagia Sophia is mostly built according to the brick-enclosed rhythm and has rich ceramic decoration on the drums of the antennae of the cross.

The elaborate decoration of the interior of the church is complemented by marble inlays; the two columns to the west and the older architrave, dating to the twelfth century, of the iconostasis, only portions of which remain to this day.

=== Art of the church ===
Fragmentary frescoes dating from the period 1348-1354 are preserved inside the building. Out of the original murals of the katholikon, the mural of the enthroned Pantocrator in the alcove of the church is the best preserved, in contrast to the eastern chapels, where the painted decorations are preserved almost in their entirety. With the exception of the murals in the northeast chapel, which date to the end of the fourteenth century, the rest of the representations are placed in the second half of the same century.

== Gallery ==
Hagia Sophia of Mystras

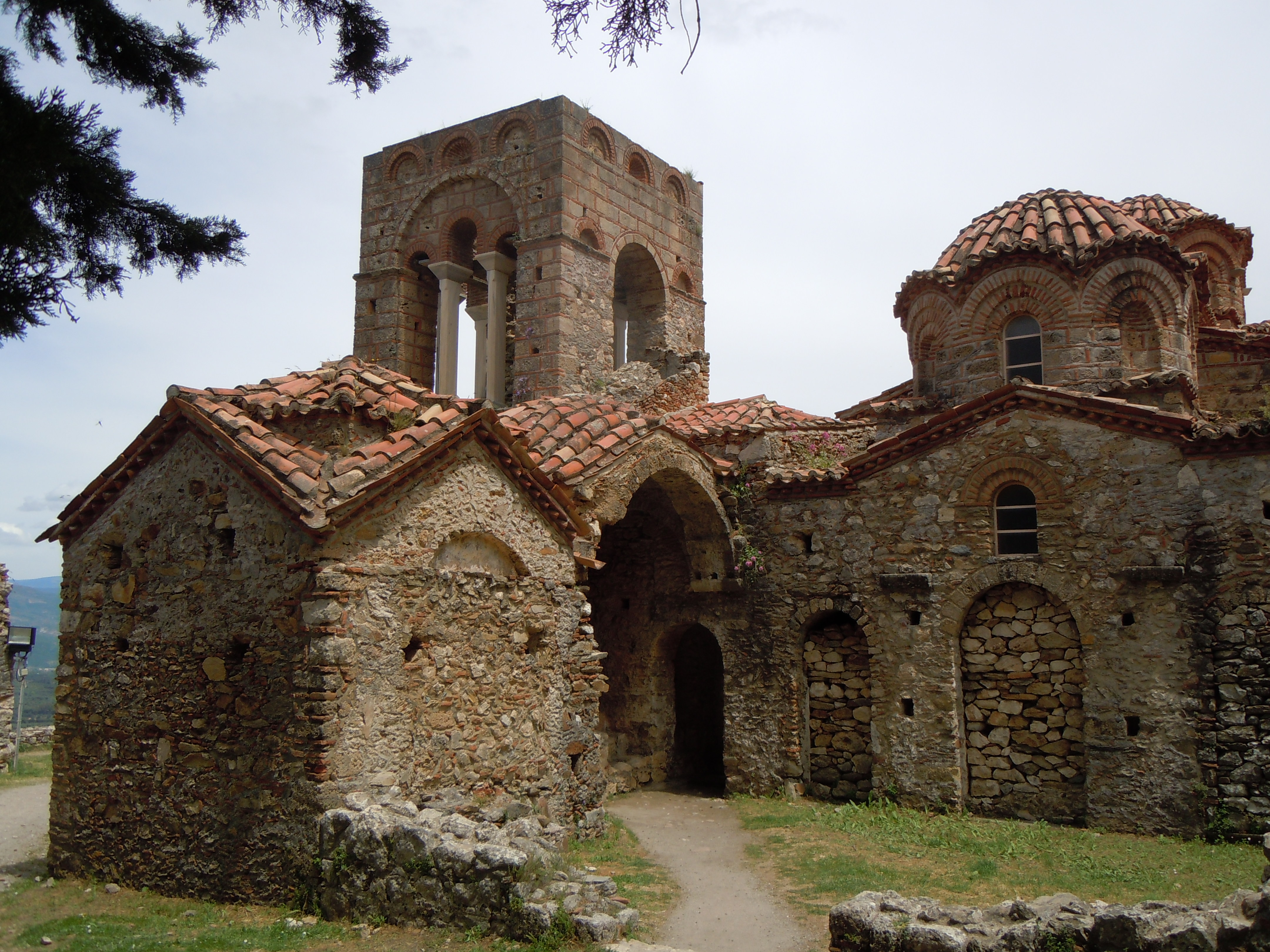
View from the west.

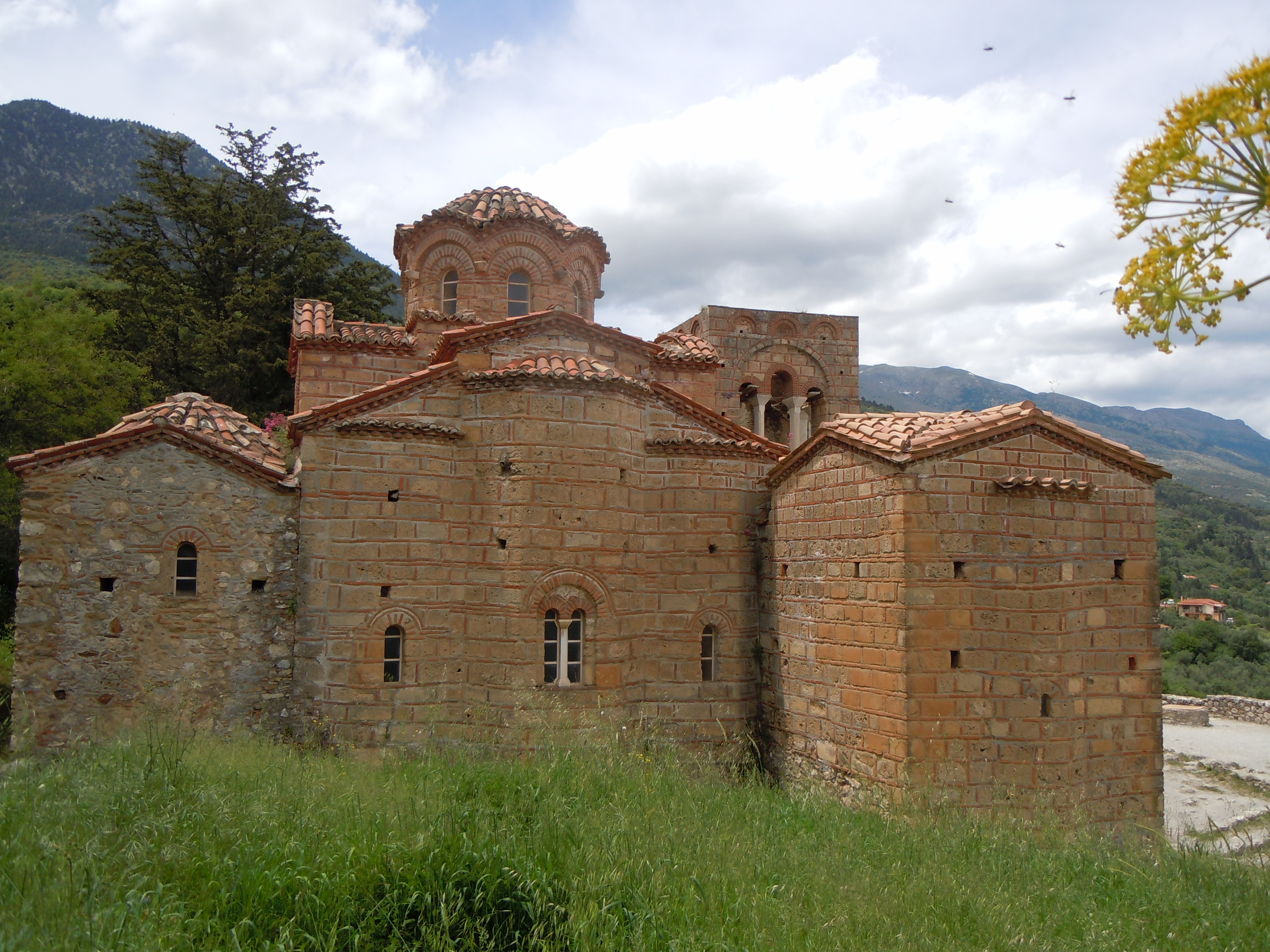
View from the east.

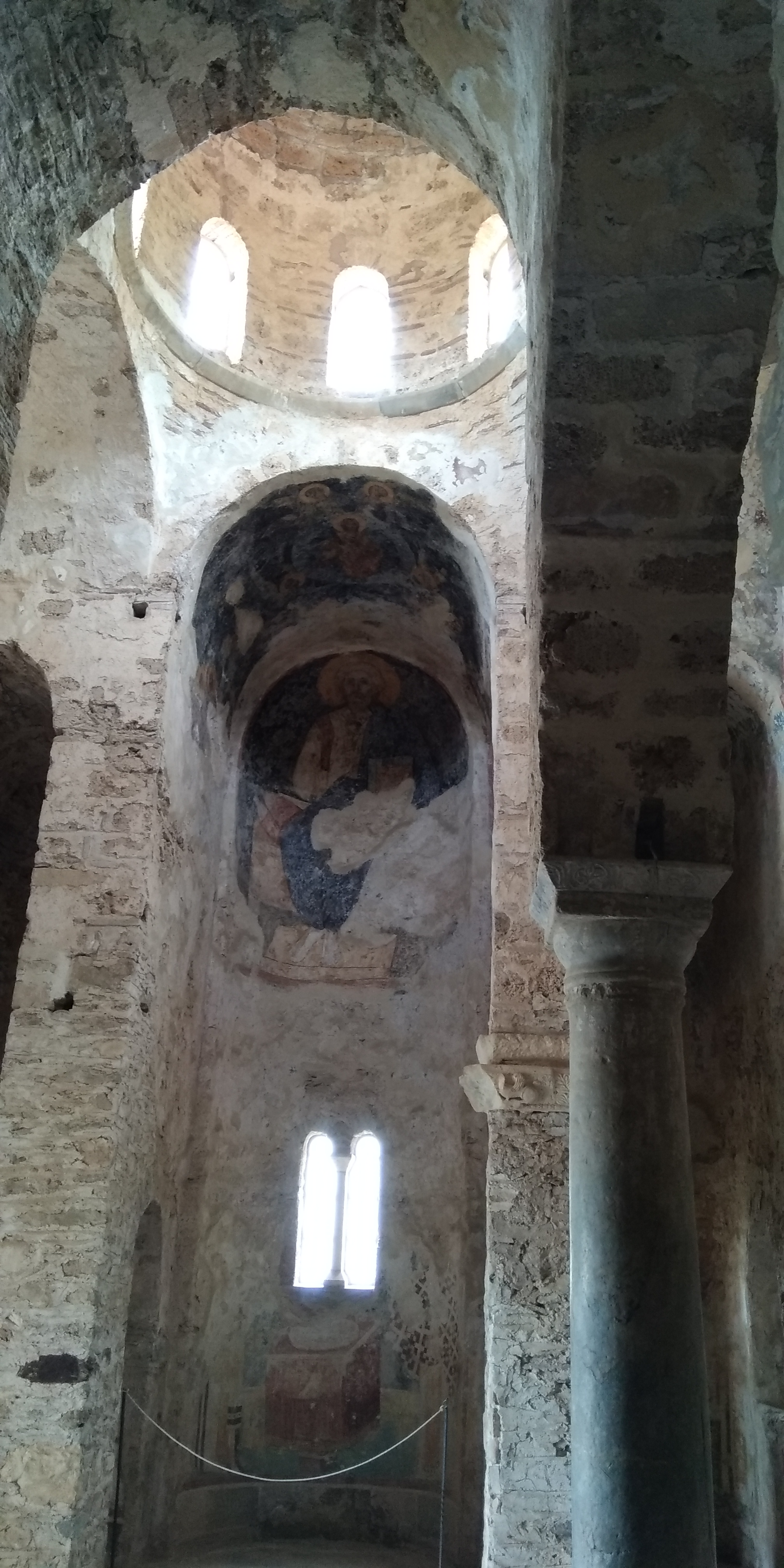
Interior of Hagia Sophia.

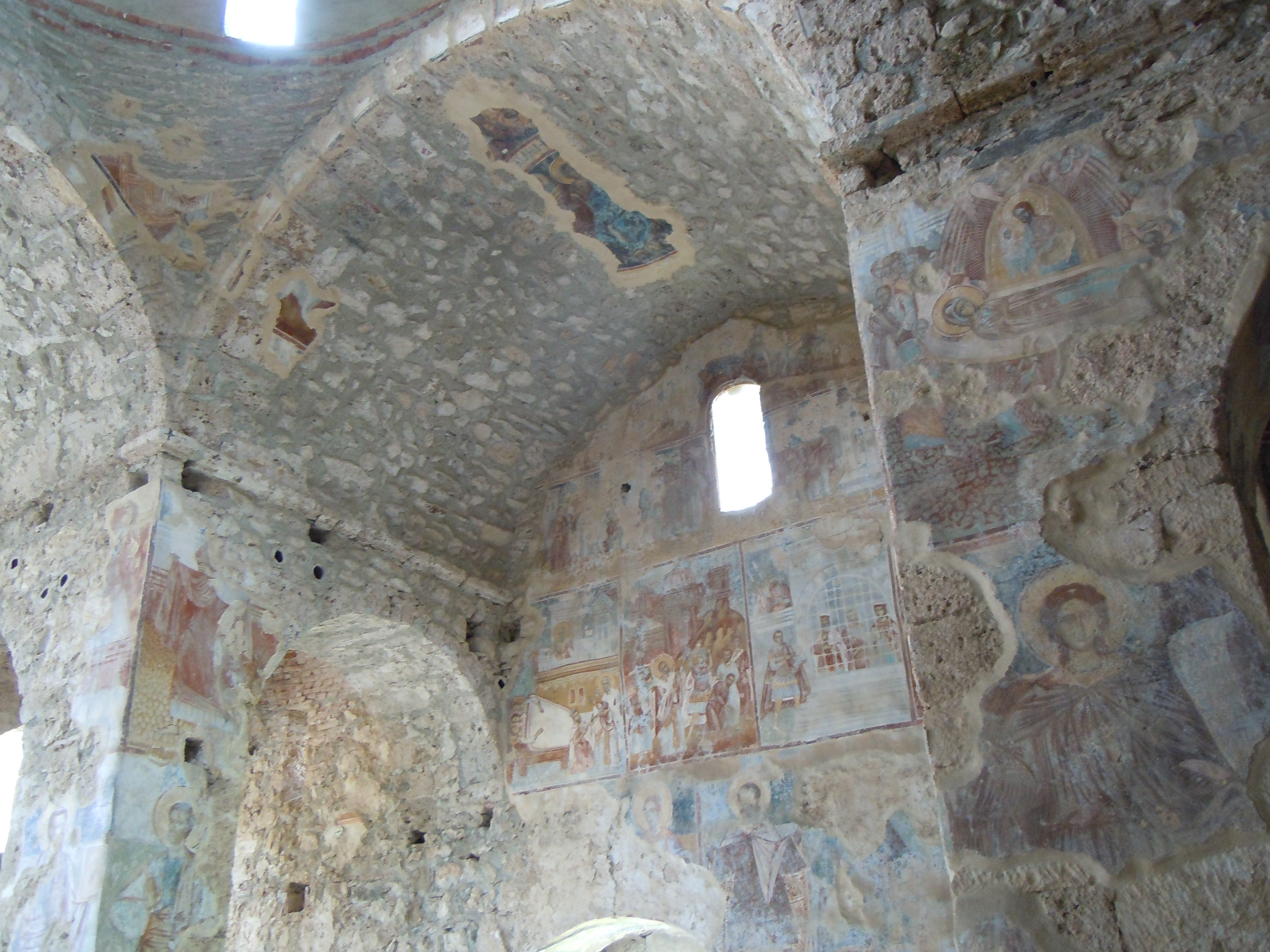
Murals in the interior.

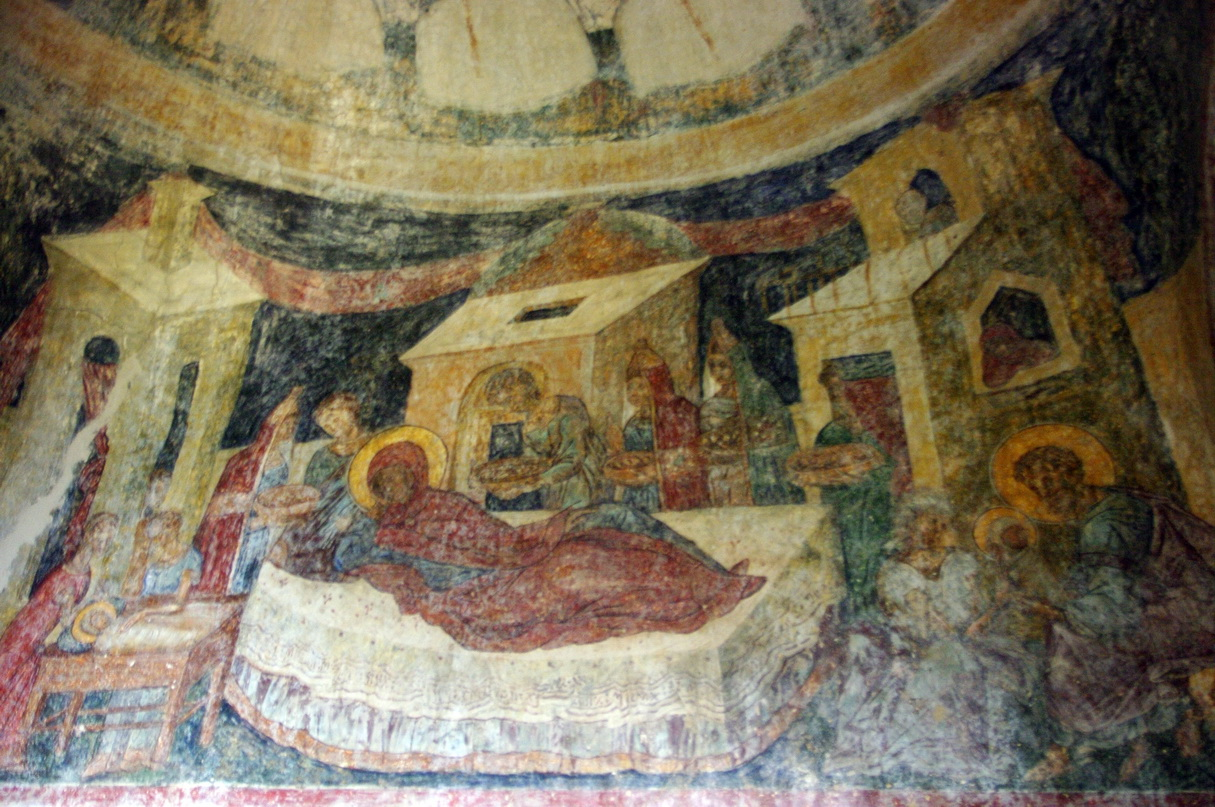
A mural.

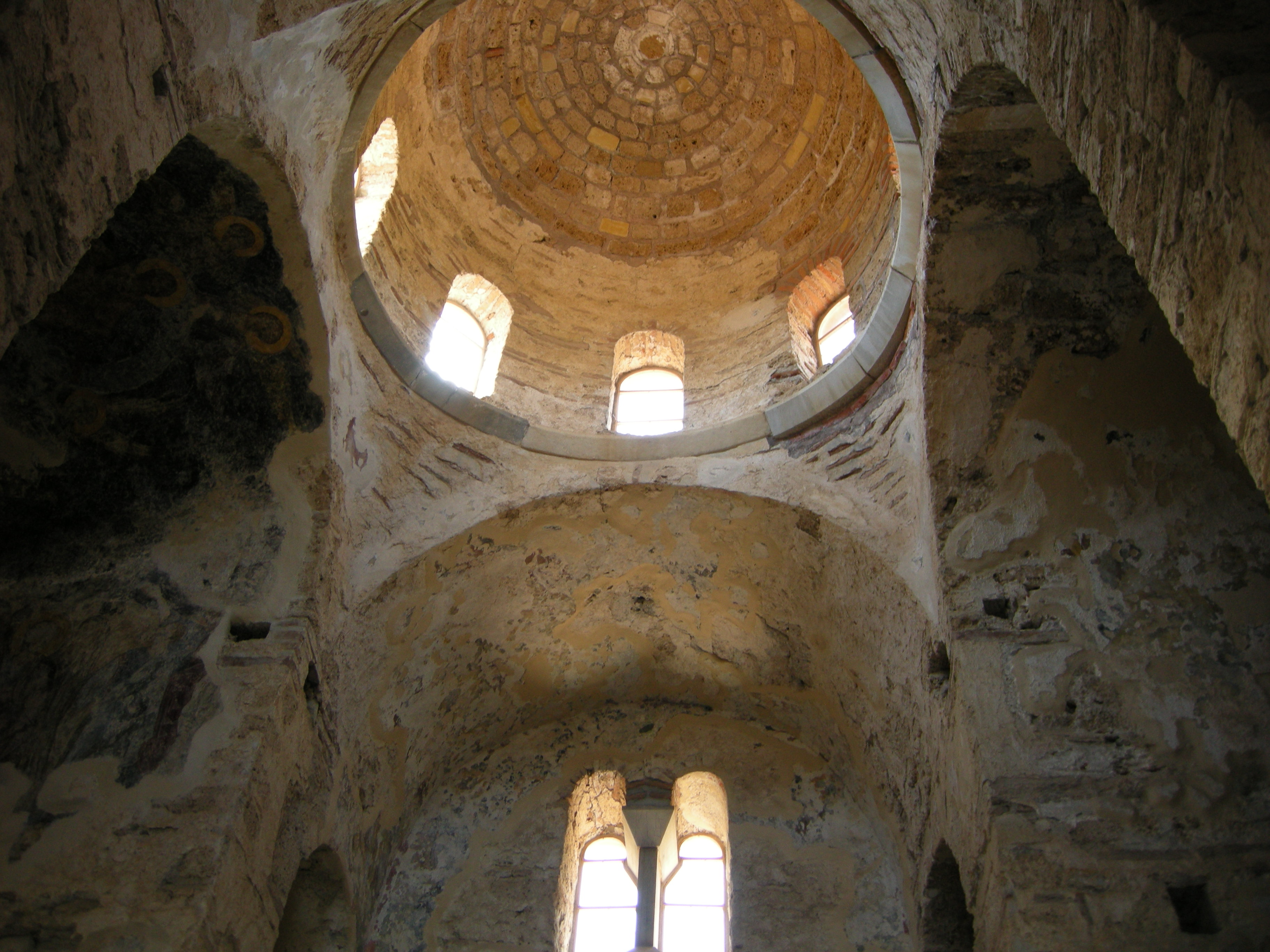
The dome of Hagia Sophia.

== See also ==
- Byzantine Greece
- Hagia Sophia, Thessaloniki
- Church of Greece
- Byzantine architecture
