= Mystras =

World Heritage Site in Peloponnese, Greece

Mystras Μυστράς
- Municipal unit
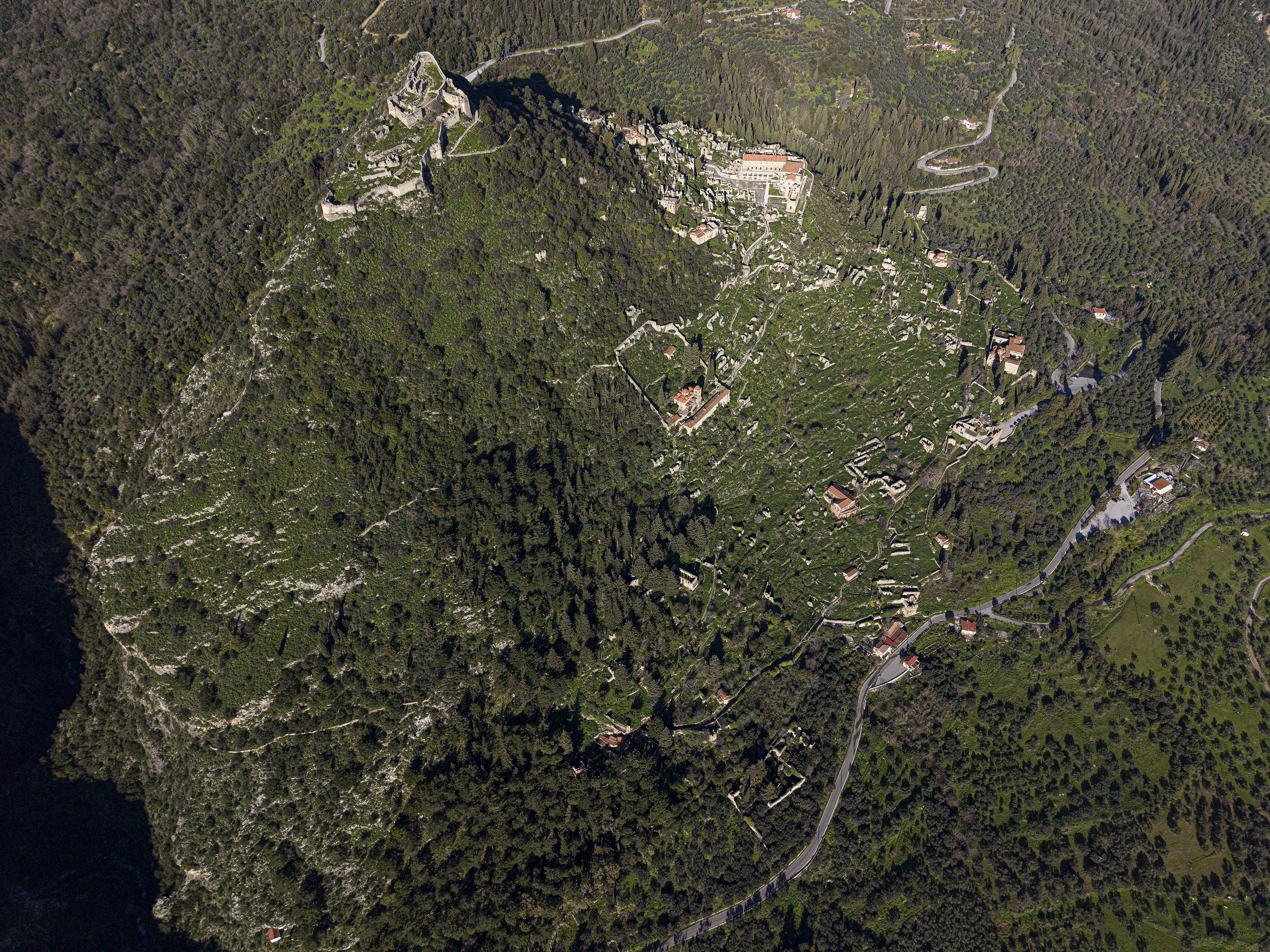
- Archeological Site of Mystras

- Location within the regional unit

- Location within Greece
- Coordinates: 37°4′N 22°23′E
- Country: Greece
- Administrative region: Peloponnese
- Regional unit: Laconia
- Municipality: Sparta

Area
  - Municipal unit: 131.9 km^{2} (50.9 sq mi)
- Elevation: 310 m (1,020 ft)

Population (2021)
  - Municipal unit: 4,238
  - Municipal unit density: 32.13/km^{2} (83.22/sq mi)
  - Community: 724
- Time zone: UTC+2 (EET)
  - Summer (DST): UTC+3 (EEST)
- Postal code: 231 00
- Area code: 27310
- Vehicle registration: ΑΚ

UNESCO World Heritage Site
- Official name: Archaeological Site of Mystras
- Criteria: Cultural: ii, iii, iv
- Reference: 511
- Inscription: 1989 (13th Session)
- Area: 54.43 ha (134.5 acres)
- Buffer zone: 1,202.52 ha (2,971.5 acres)

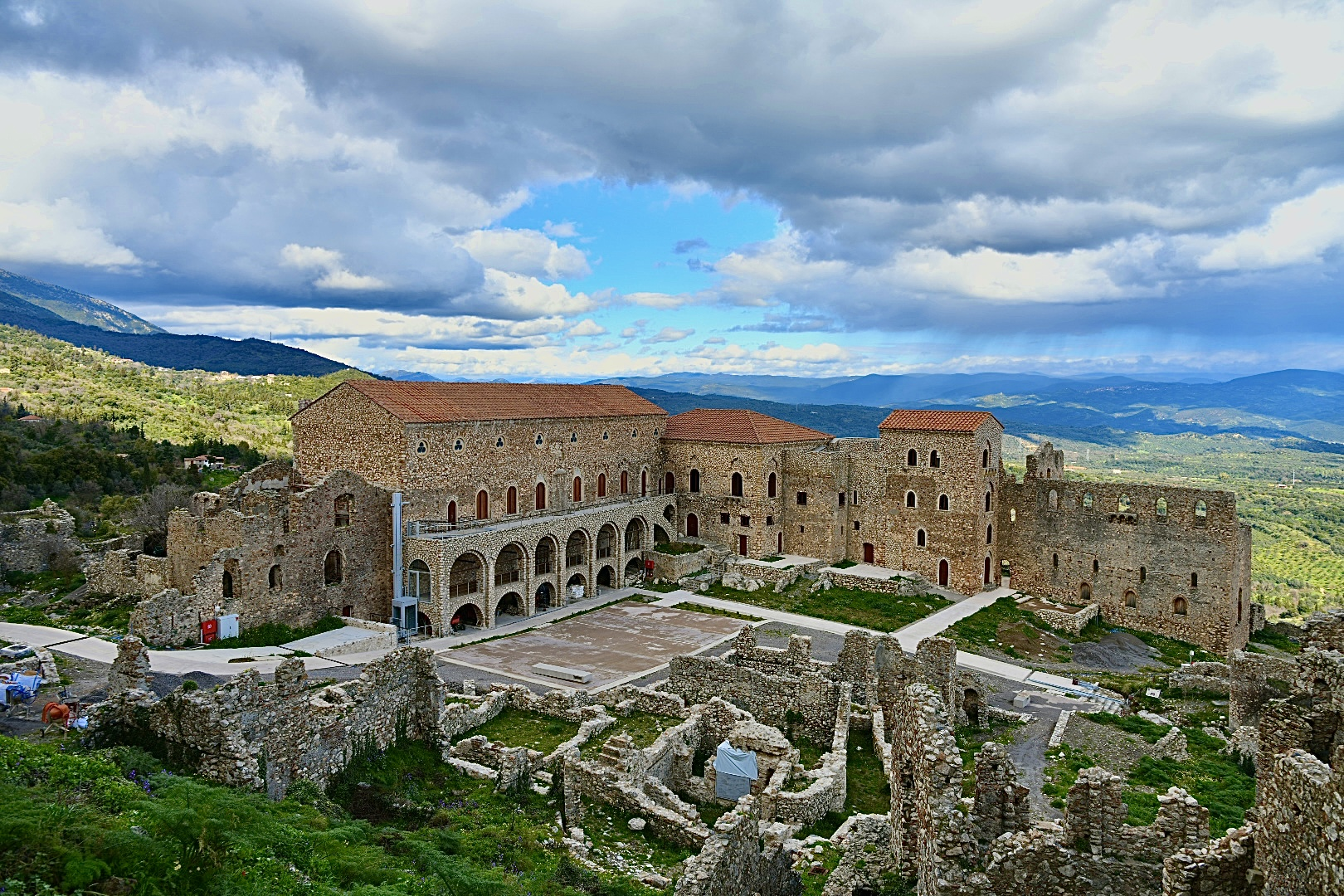
Mystras in 2026

Mystras or Mistras (Greek: Μυστρᾶς/Μιστρᾶς), also known in the Chronicle of the Morea as Myzethras or Myzithras (Μυζηθρᾶς), is a fortified town and a former municipality in Laconia, Peloponnese, Greece. Situated in the Taygetus range, above ancient Sparta, and below a "Frankish" castle, it served as the capital of the Byzantine Despotate of the Morea in the 14th and 15th centuries, experiencing a period of prosperity and cultural flowering during the Palaeologan Renaissance, attracting artists, architects, and intellectuals such as Gemistos Plethon. The last Byzantine emperor, Constantine XI Palaiologos, was despot of Mystras before coming to the throne of Constantinople.

Mystras remained inhabited throughout the Ottoman period, when foreign travellers mistook it for ancient Sparta. In the 1830s, it was abandoned and the new town of Sparta was built, approximately eight kilometres to the east. The 2011 local government reform attached it to the municipality of Sparta.

As an exceptionally well-preserved example of a Byzantine city and because of its testimony to the development of Late Byzantine and Post-Byzantine art, Mystras was inscribed on the UNESCO World Heritage List in 1989.

== Description ==
Mystras is situated on a slope of the Taygetos mountains. The archaeological site stands above the modern village of Mystras and the city of Sparta. The greenery surrounding the area is composed mainly of pines and cypresses. There are small rivers and lakes nearby. The city's architecture was influenced by the "Helladic" school of Byzantine architecture, and many structures were informed by the architecture of Constantinople. Its overall urban planning though was shaped by the steeply sloping topography, with distinct upper and lower city zones. The slope made wheeled vehicles impractical, so many of the streets are best characterized as footpaths. The main use of a terrace is for the Palace of the Despots (#8 on the plan below), and markets seem to have been located outside of the city walls. The Palace of the Despots expanded over the fourteenth and fifteenth centuries and included several independent, adjoining units. The final main building follows the form of the Tekfur saray in Constantinople/Istanbul: three stories with the topmost devoted to a large audience hall, and the lower levels used for apartments and storerooms.

During the Palaeologan Renaissance, the churches of Mystras were covered in elaborate frescoes and were well known for their libraries. Some of these decorations can still be seen in the Hagia Sophia church in the archeological site.

In addition to the Palace of the Despots and its famed late Byzantine churches, Mystras also has remains of several houses set on its hillside, such as the Frangopoulos House and the Laskaris House, both of which are early fifteenth-century buildings that use vaulted substructures for cisterns and stables to create a platform for the main residence. That consisted of a large room fronted by a balcony and with a fireplace in the rear.

== History ==
=== Foundation and Frankish rule ===
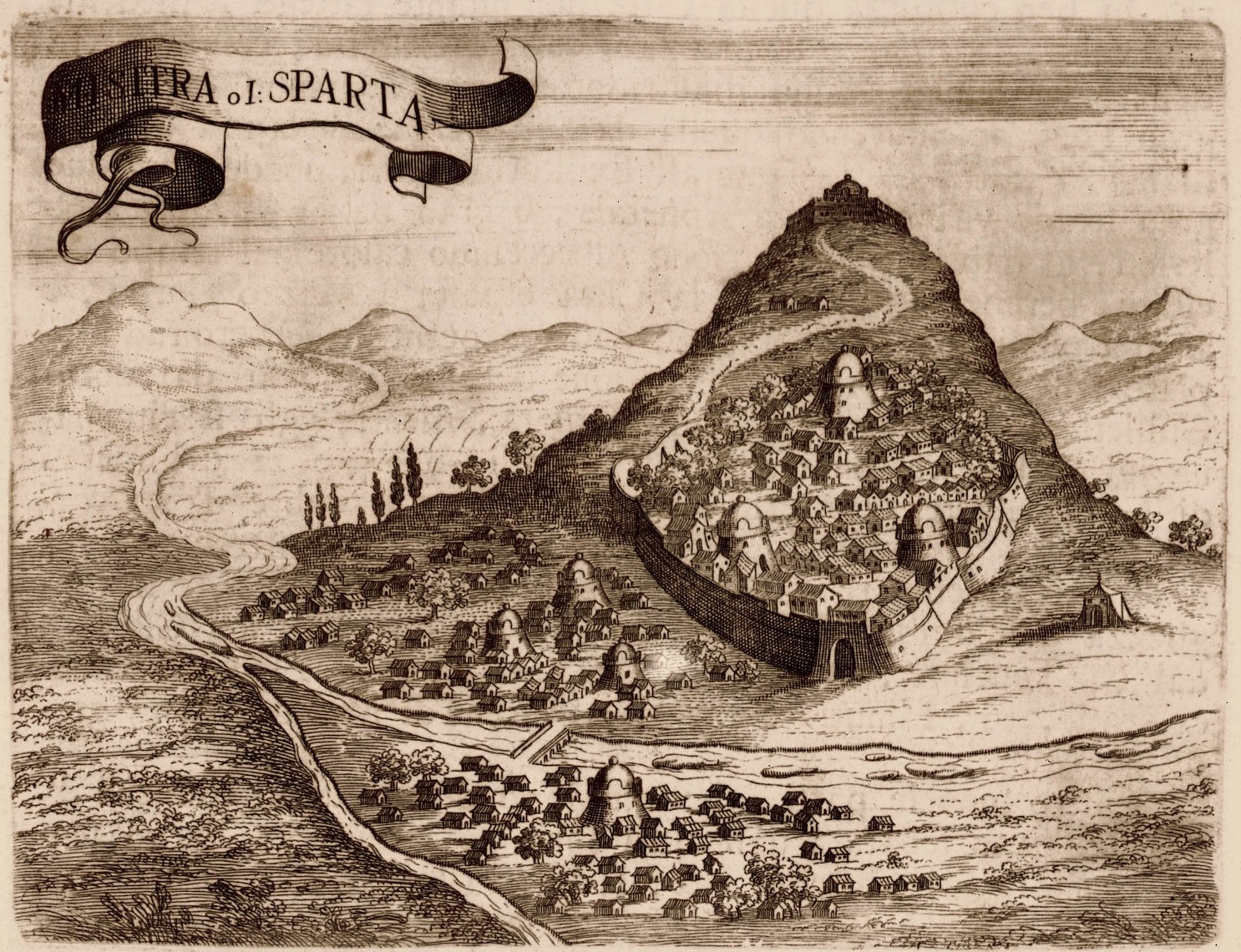
Mystras, 1686.

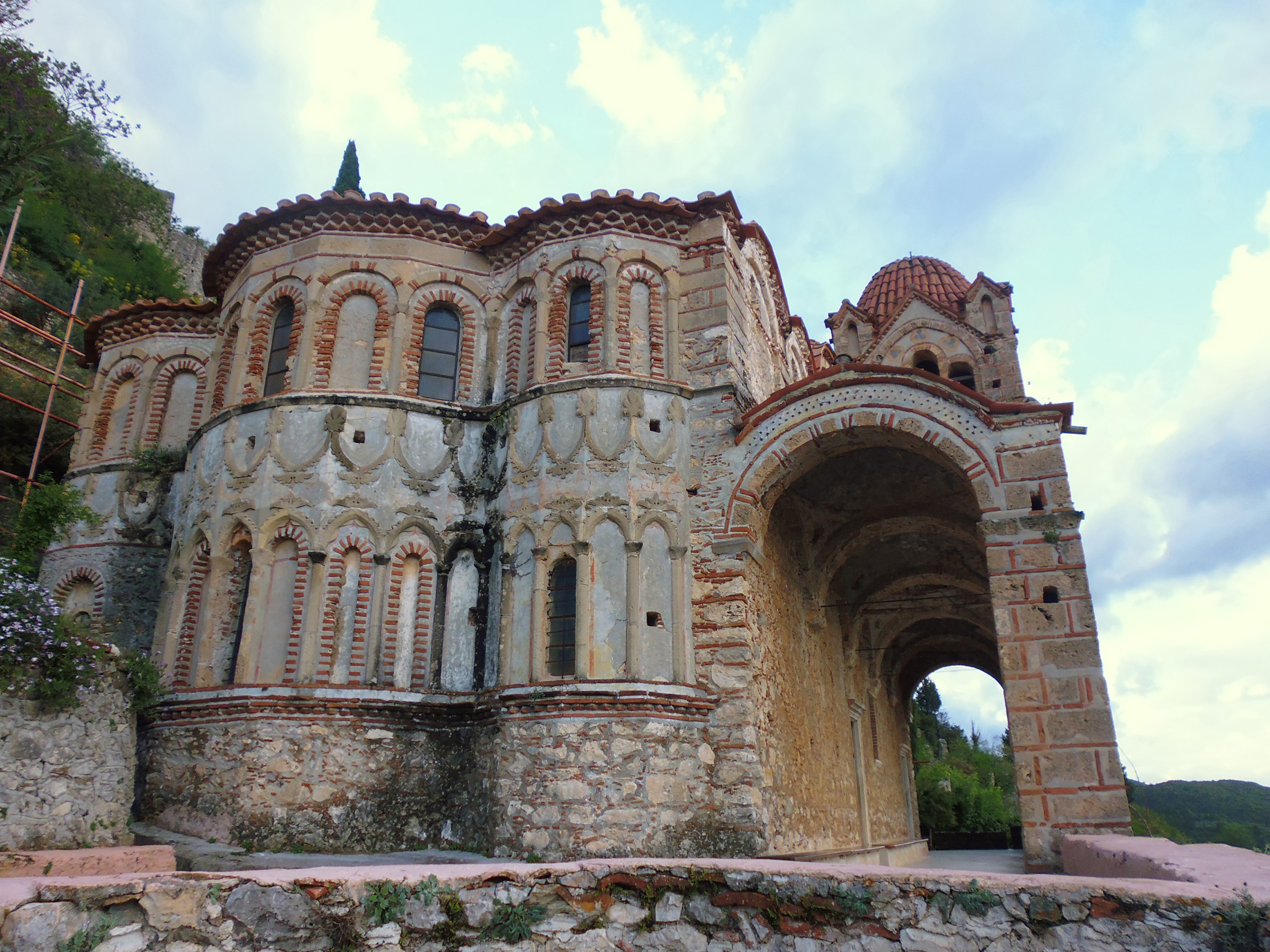
Pantanassa Monastery detail

In late 1248, William II of Villehardouin, ruler of the Frankish Principality of Achaea, captured Monemvasia, the last remaining Byzantine outpost on the Morea. This success was soon followed by the submission of the restive Tsakones on Mount Parnon, the Slavic Melingoi tribe of Mount Taygetos, and the inhabitants of the Mani peninsula, thereby extending his sway over all of Laconia and completing the conquest of the peninsula, which had begun in 1205, in the aftermath of the Fourth Crusade. Laconia was incorporated into the princely domain, and the young prince passed the winter of 1248–49 there, touring the country and selecting sites for new fortifications such as Grand Magne and Leuktron; finally, near his residence of Lacedaemon (ancient Sparta), on a spur of Mount Taygetos, he built the fortress that came to be known as Mystras.

=== Byzantine restoration ===
In September 1259, William of Villehardouin was defeated and captured, along with many of his nobles, at the Battle of Pelagonia, by the forces of the Nicaean emperor Michael VIII Palaiologos. Two years later, the Nicaeans recaptured Constantinople, putting an end to the Latin Empire and restoring the Byzantine Empire. At this point, the emperor concluded an agreement with the captive prince: William and his men would be set free in exchange for an oath of fealty, and for the cession of Monemvasia, Grand Magne, and Mystras. The handover was effected in 1262, and henceforth Mystras was the seat of the governor of the Byzantine territories in the Morea. Initially this governor (kephale) was changed every year, but after 1308 they started being appointed for longer terms. Almost immediately on his return to the Morea, William of Villehardouin renounced his oath to the emperor, and warfare broke out between Byzantines and Franks. The first Byzantine attempts to subdue the Principality of Achaea were beaten back in the battles of Prinitsa and Makryplagi, but the Byzantines were firmly ensconced in Laconia. Warfare became endemic, and the Byzantines slowly pushed the Franks back. The insecurity engendered by the raids and counter-raids caused the inhabitants of Lacedaemon to abandon their exposed city and settle at Mystras, in a new town built under the shadow of the fortress.

While Mystras served as the provincial capital from this time, it became a royal capital in 1349 CE, when the first despot was appointed to rule over the Morea. The Byzantine Emperor John VI Kantakouzenos, reorganized the territory in 1349 to establish it as an appanage for his son, the Despot Manuel Kantakouzenos. From 1349 until its surrender to the Ottoman Turks on 31 May 1460, Mystras was the residence of a Despot who ruled over the Byzantine Morea, known as the "Despotate of the Morea". For the larger portion of his reign, Manuel maintained peaceful relations with his Latin neighbors and secured a long period of prosperity for the area. Greco-Latin cooperation included an alliance to contain the raids of the Ottoman Sultan Murad I into Morea in the 1360s. The rival Palaiologos dynasty seized the Morea after Manuel's death in 1380, with Theodore I Palaiologos becoming despot in 1383. Theodore ruled until 1407, consolidating Byzantine rule and coming to terms with his more powerful neighbours—particularly the expansionist Ottoman Empire, whose suzerainty he recognised.

This was the city's golden age; according to the Oxford Dictionary of Byzantium, Mystras "witnessed a remarkable cultural renaissance, including the teaching of Plethon, and attracted artists and architects of the highest quality"

==== Centre of learning and culture ====
Mystras was the last centre of Byzantine learning and culture; the famous Neoplatonist philosopher Gemistos Plethon lived there until he died in 1452. While there, Plethon served as a tutor and advisor to the young despot Theodore II until his death in 1452. He and other scholars based in Mystras influenced the Italian Renaissance, especially after he accompanied the emperor John VIII Palaiologos to Florence in 1439.

=== Ottoman and Venetian years ===
The last Byzantine emperor, Constantine XI Palaiologos, was despot at Mystras before he came to the throne. Demetrios Palaiologos, the last despot of Morea, surrendered the city to Sultan Mehmed II in 30 May 1460. Under Ottoman rule it became part of the Sanjak of Mezistre. The Venetians occupied it from 1687 to 1715, but otherwise the Ottomans held it until 1821. The city joined the Orlov revolt in 1770. It was looted by Ottoman Albanians and the metropolitan bishop Ananias executed, despite having saved several Albanian lives in the uprising. A great number of local Greeks were also killed by the Albanian groups, while several children were sold into slavery. Mystras was left in ruins and this event was a significant factor leading up to its abandonment.

=== Modern years ===
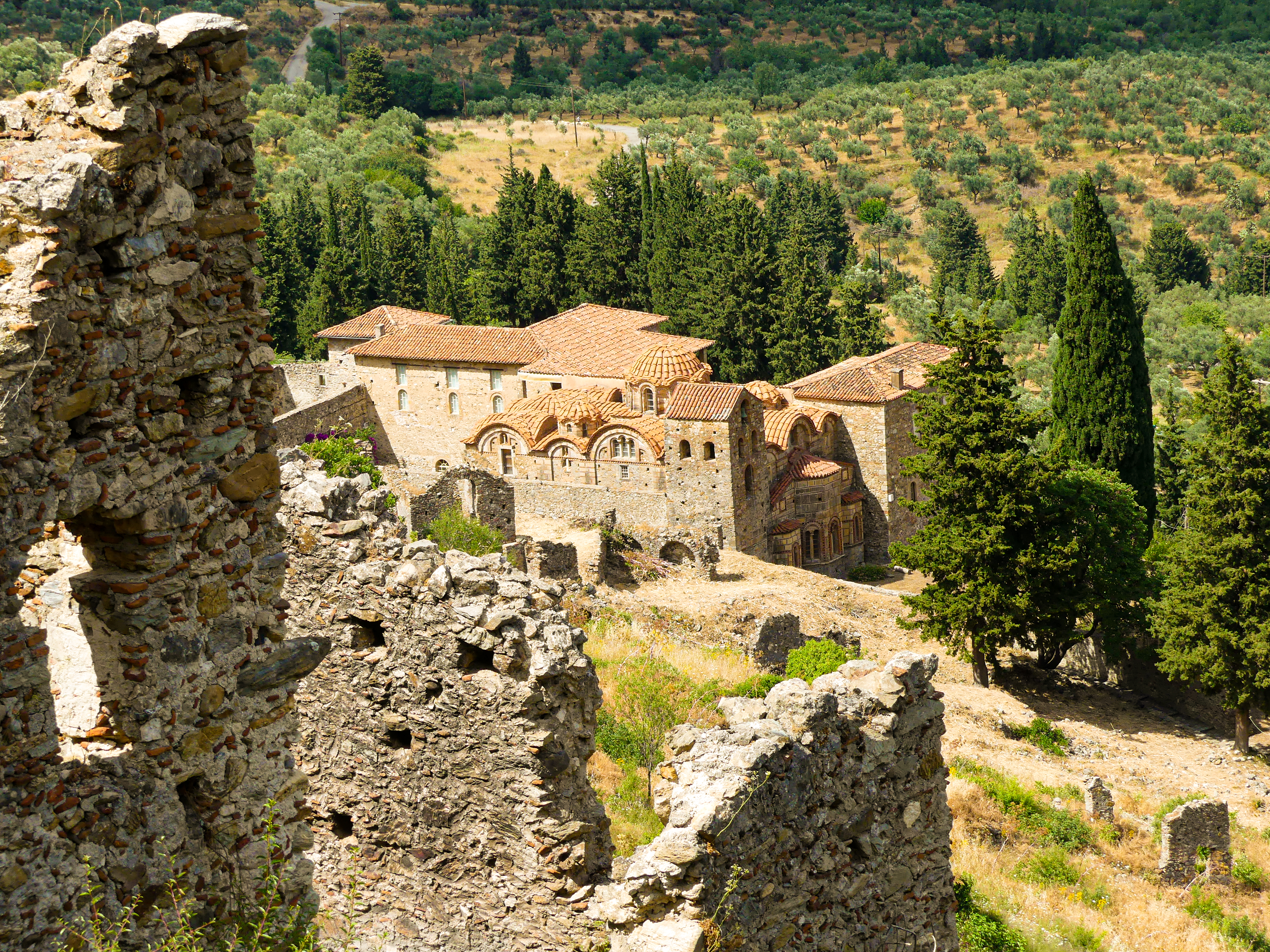
Photo of the palace in Mistra, Mystras Greece

The final straw for Mystras came in 1825 during the Greek war of Independence when Egyptians under the rule of Ibrahim massacred the local population and destroyed the local area. The town was rebuilt 9 km away under the name Sparta in 1831. Most families moved to Sparta, but a few decided to move instead to New Mystras, a small village in the countryside. This process of relocation was completed in 1953 when the remaining properties were confiscated by the municipality.

In 1989 the ruins, including the fortress, palace, churches, and monasteries, were named a UNESCO World Heritage Site and features a museum and the partially restored ruins of the city. The only inhabitants today are a group of nuns who reside in the Pantanassa Monastery. The majority of the most important churches are still standing, including St. Demetrios, the Hagia Sophia, St. George, and the Monastery of Peribleptos. The Palace of the Despots, the only Byzantine palace existing today, has undergone substantial restorations in the past decade and is reopening in May 2026, making it a significant attraction. Visitors can reach the ruins via the modern city of Sparti, which is only a few miles from Mystras.

== Subdivisions ==
The municipal unit Mystras is subdivided into the following communities:

- Mystras
- Magoula, the former municipal seat of Mystras municipality.
- Agia Eirini
- Agios Ioannis Lakedaimonas
- Anavryti
- Barsinikos
- Longastra
- Parori, Laconia
- Soustianoi
- Trypi

=== Historical population ===
Year	Municipal district	Municipal unit
1981	920	–
1991	525	4,592
2001	807	4,608
2011	832	4,265
2021	724	4,238

== Notable people ==
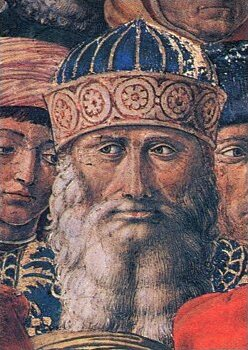
Gemistus Pletho

=== People from Mystras ===
- Manuel Kantakouzenos, first Despot of Morea
- Dimitra Strumpolis Sarantakos, mother of famous illusionist magician Criss Angel

=== People buried in Mystras ===
- John VI Kantakouzenos
- Manuel Kantakouzenos
- Gemistos Plethon
- Theodora Tocco
- Cleofe Malatesta

== Plan ==
Plan of Mystras after works by G. Millet (1910) and M. Chatzidakis (1981).

1. Main entrance;
2. Metropolis;
3. Evangelistria Church;
4. Church of Saints Theodores;
5. Hodigitria-Afendiko;
6. Monemvasia Gate;
7. Church of Saint Nicholas;
8. Despot's Palace and square;
9. Nauplia Gate;
10. Upper entrance to the citadel;
11. Church of Hagia Sophia;
12. Small Palace;
13. Citadel;
14. Mavroporta;
15. Pantanassa;
16. Church of the Taxiarchs;
17. House of John Phrangopoulos;
18. Peribleptos Monastery;
19. Church of Saint George;
20. Krevatas House;
21. Marmara (entrance);
22. Aï-Yannakis;
23. Laskaris' House;
24. Church of Saint Christopher;
25. Ruins;
26. Church of Saint Kyriaki.

== Gallery ==
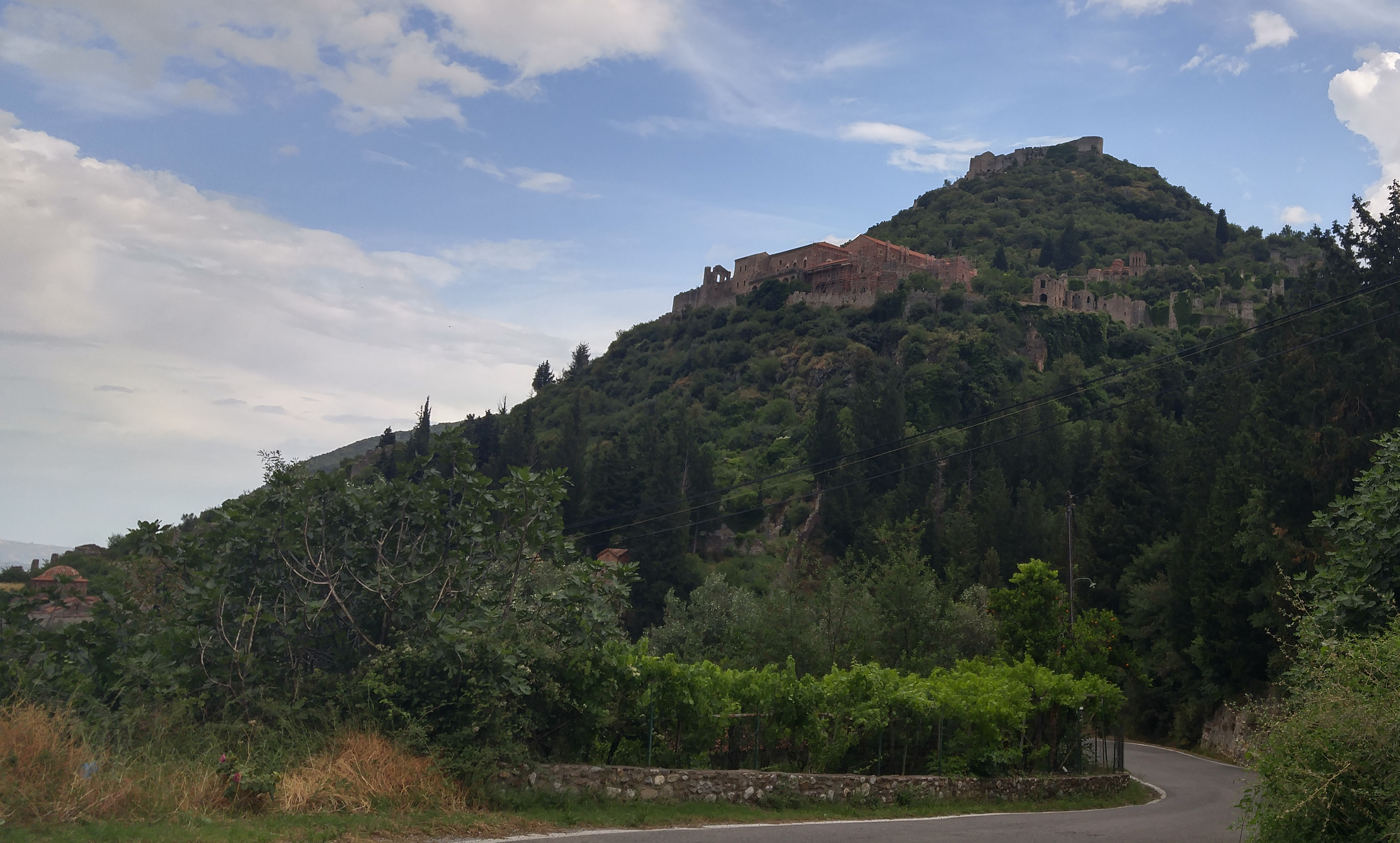
Hill of Mystras

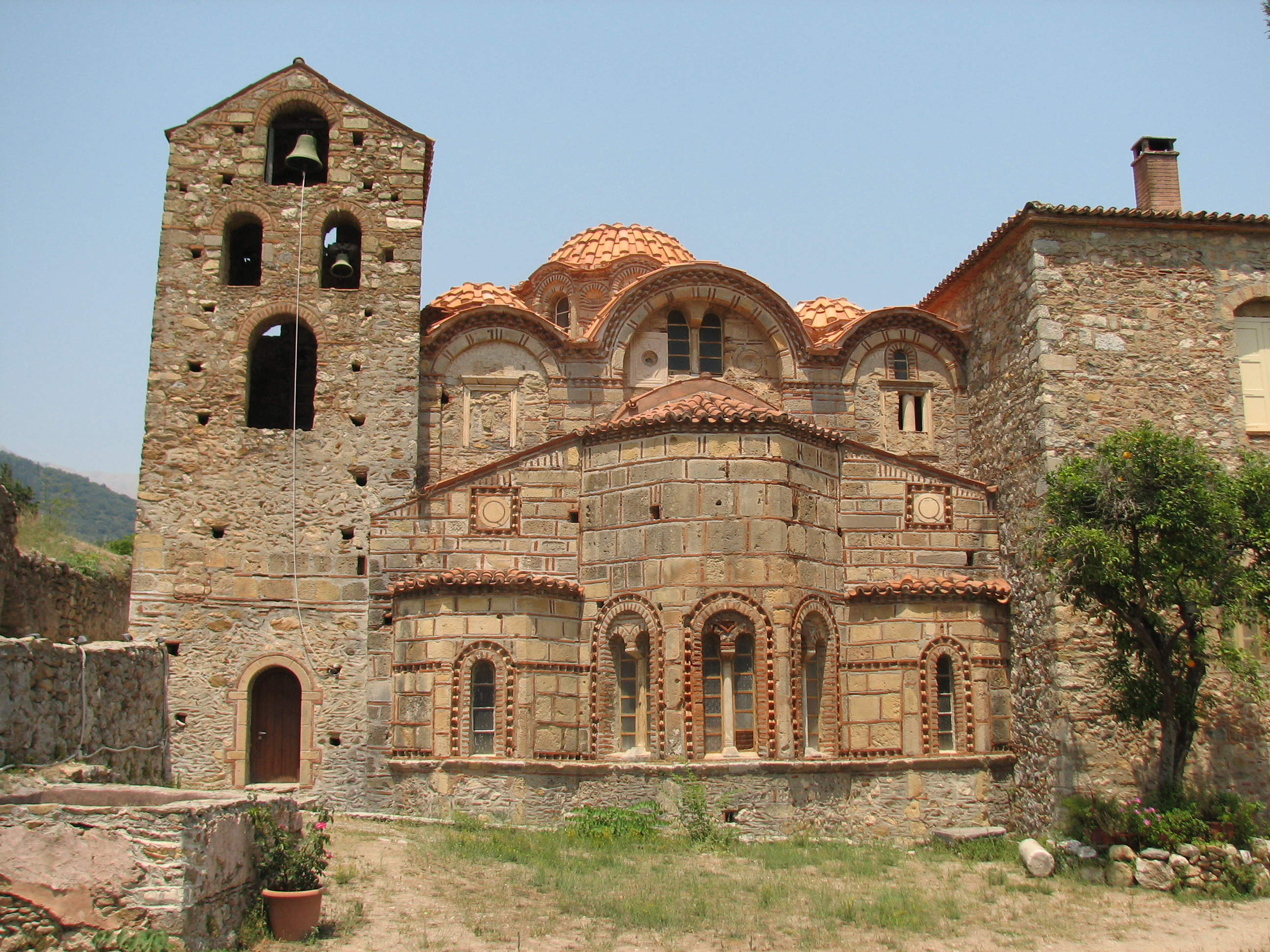
Metropolis of Mystras (St Demetrius)

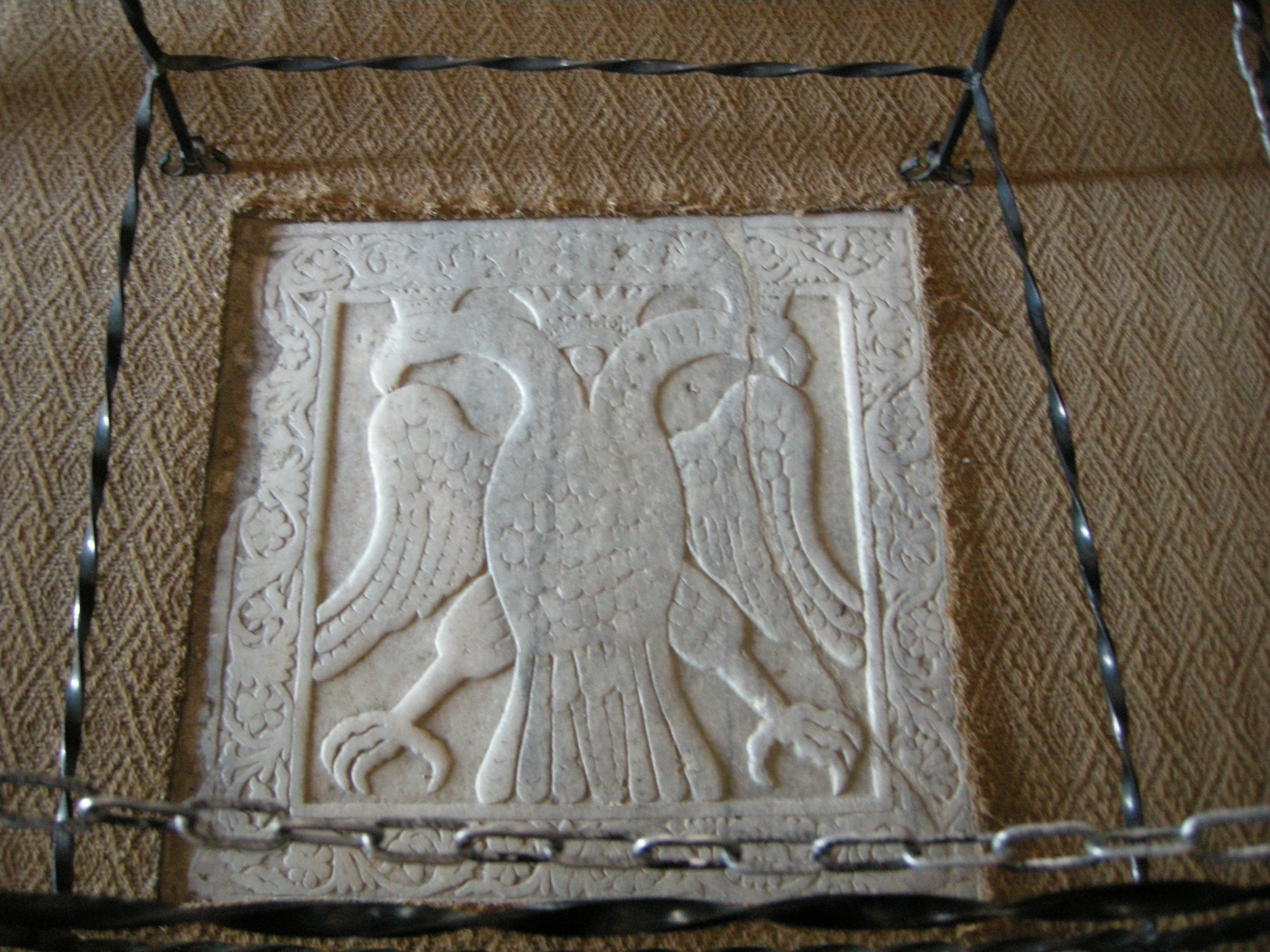
The Byzantine eagle, Metropolis

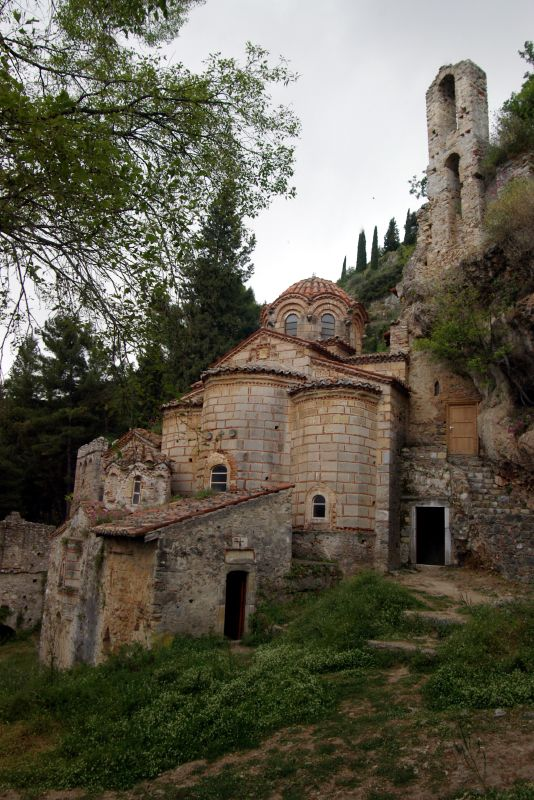
Monastery of Peribleptos

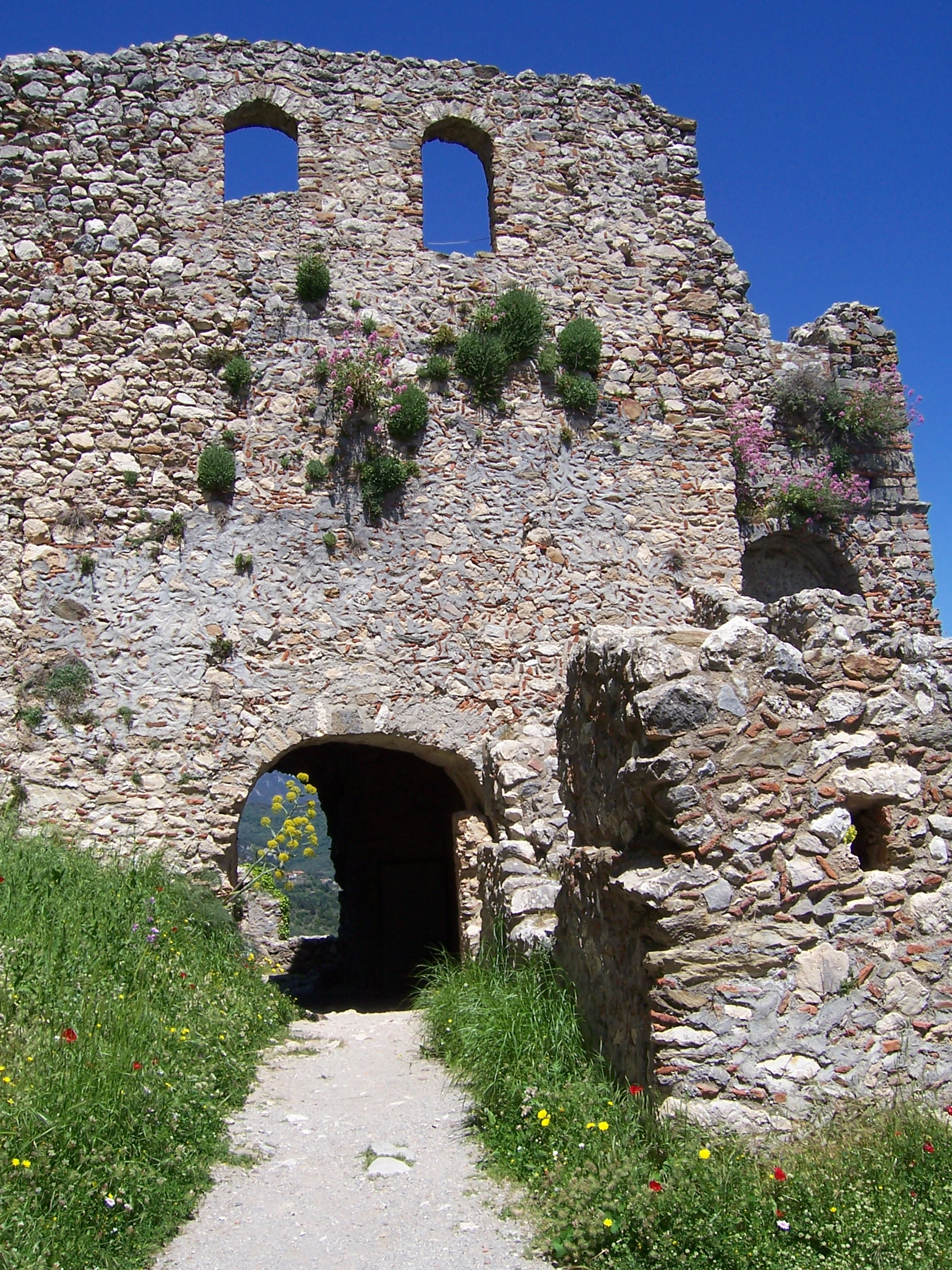
Entrance of the fortress (view from the inside)

Panorama from the top of Villehardouin's Castle

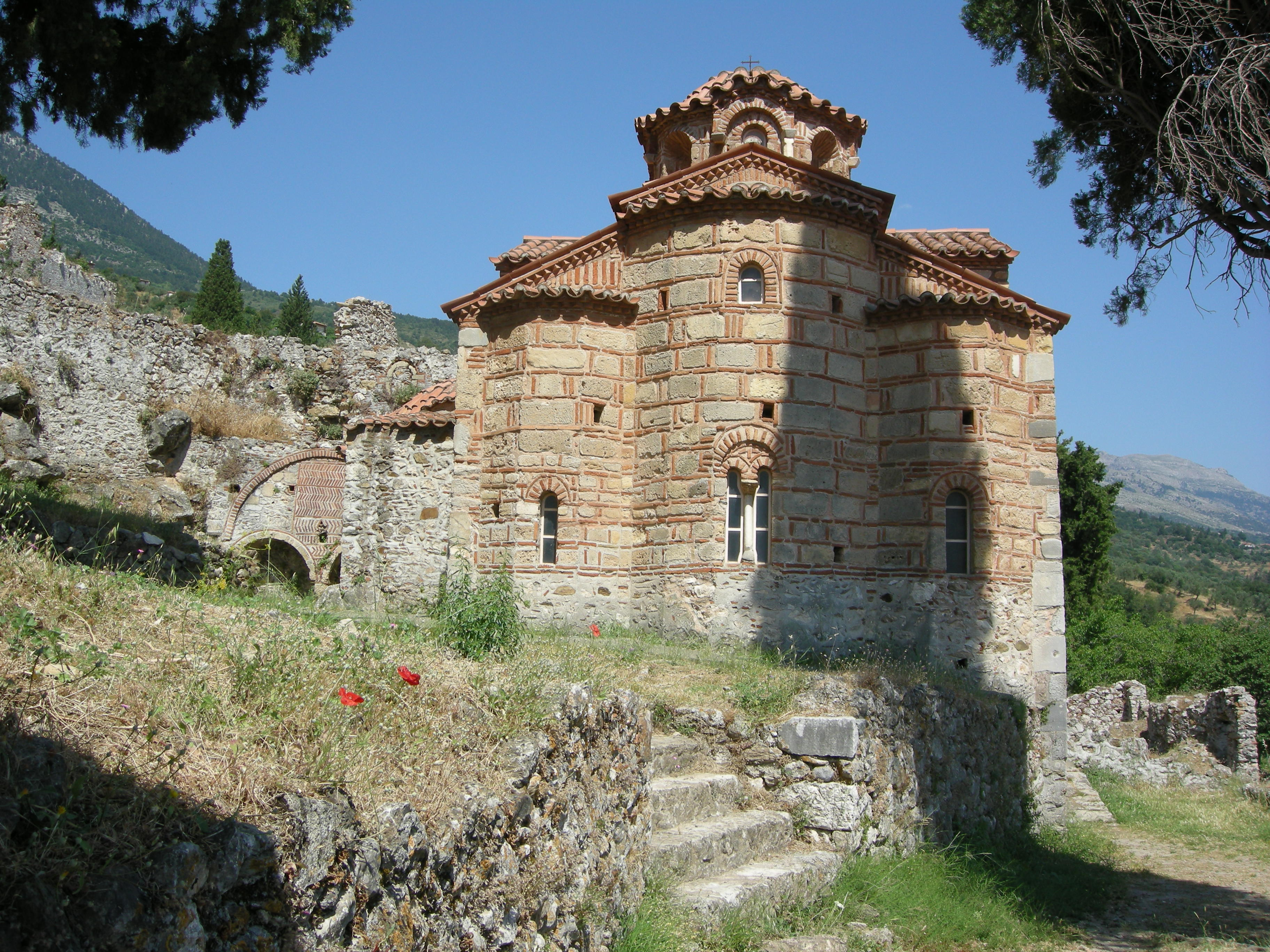
Evangelistria's church

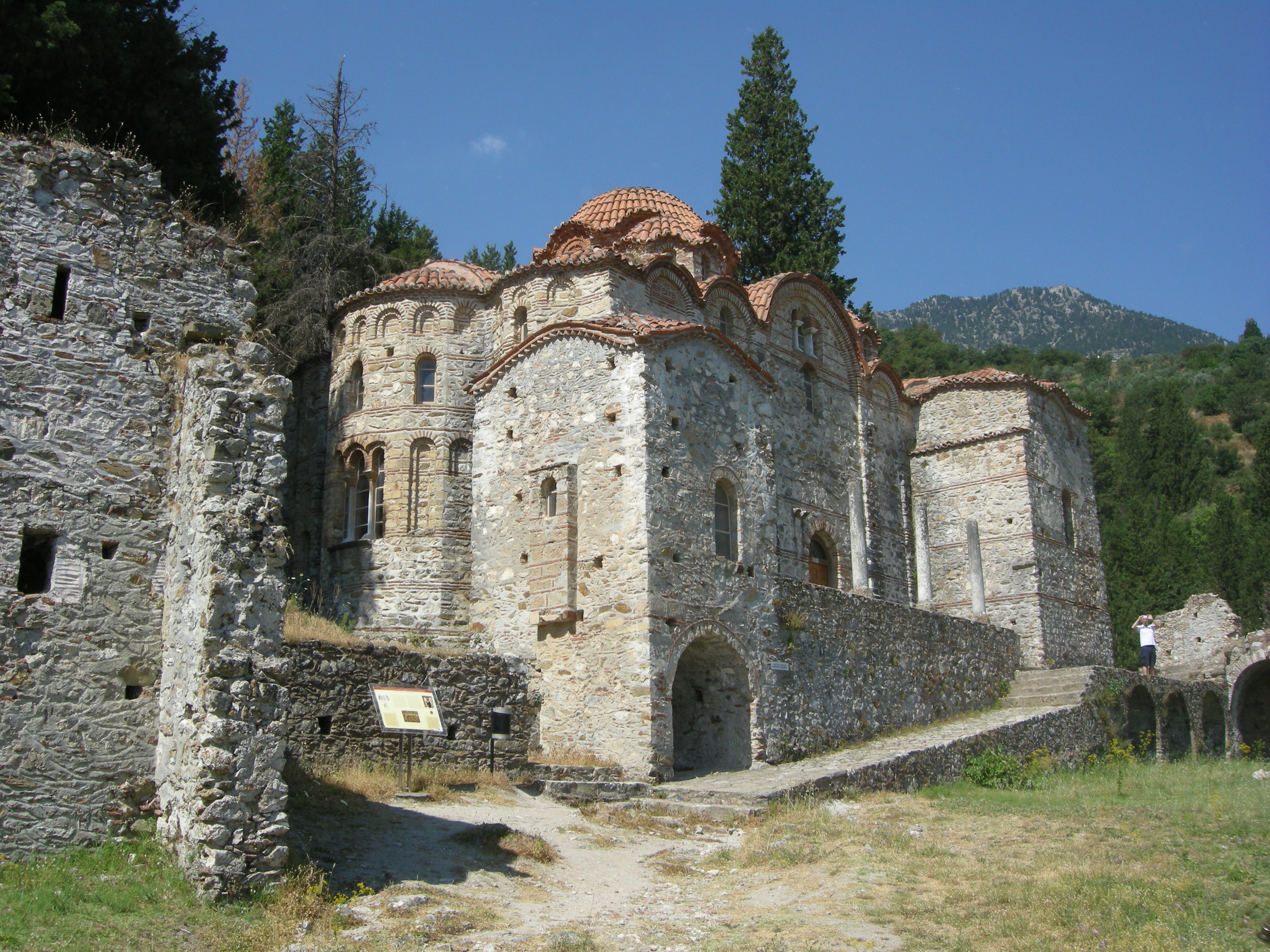
Hodigitria church

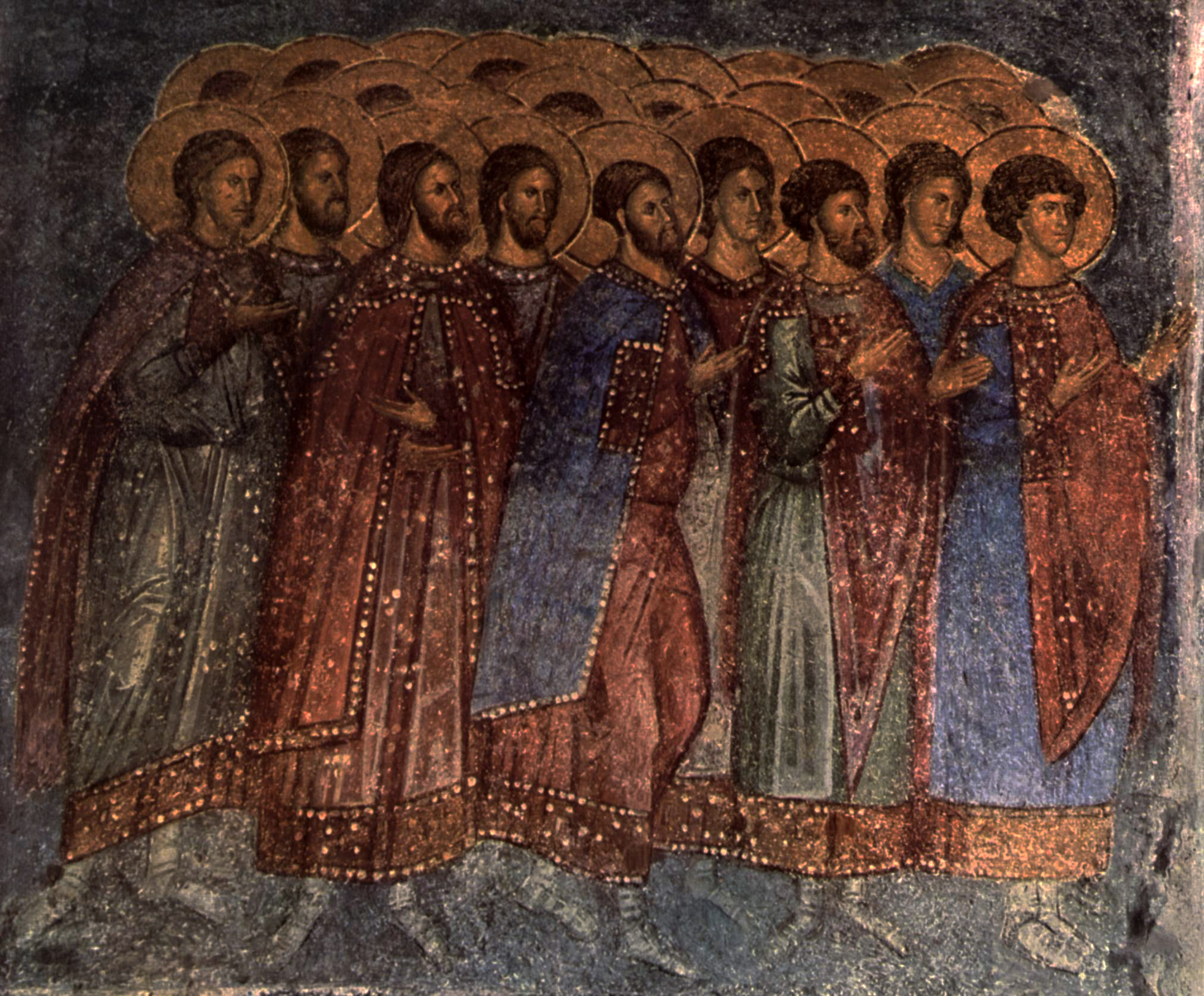
Fresco at Hodigitria's church

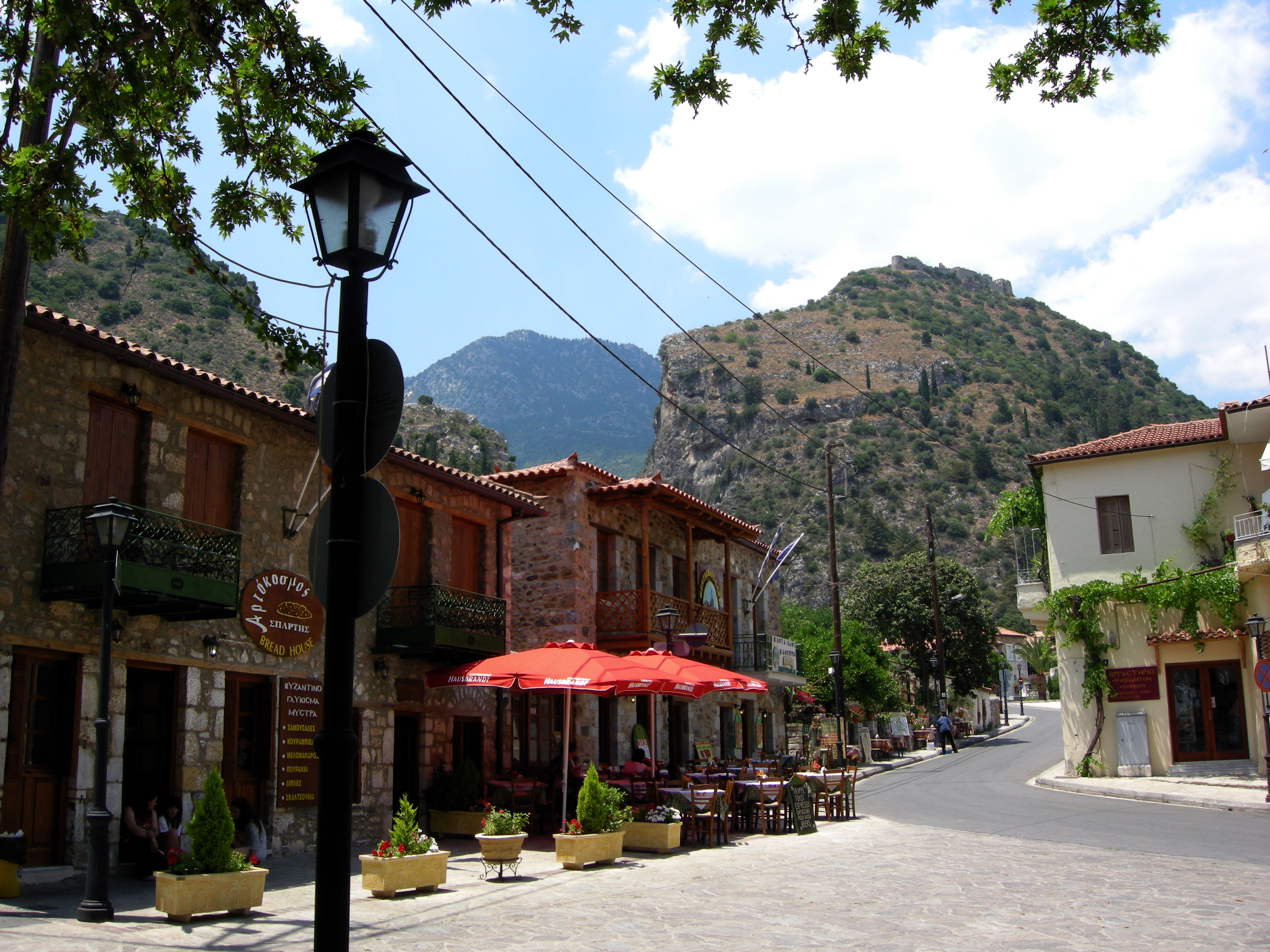
A street at the town of Mystras

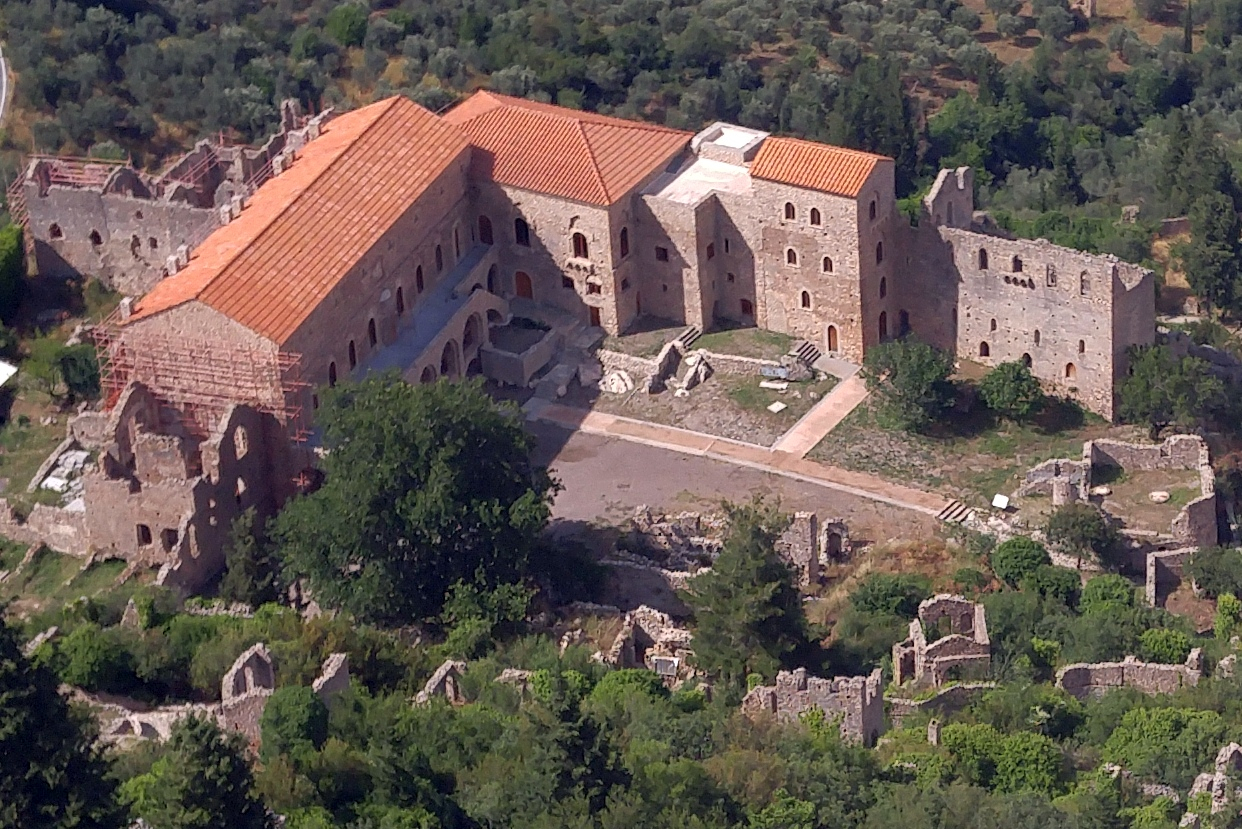
Despot's Palace (2017)

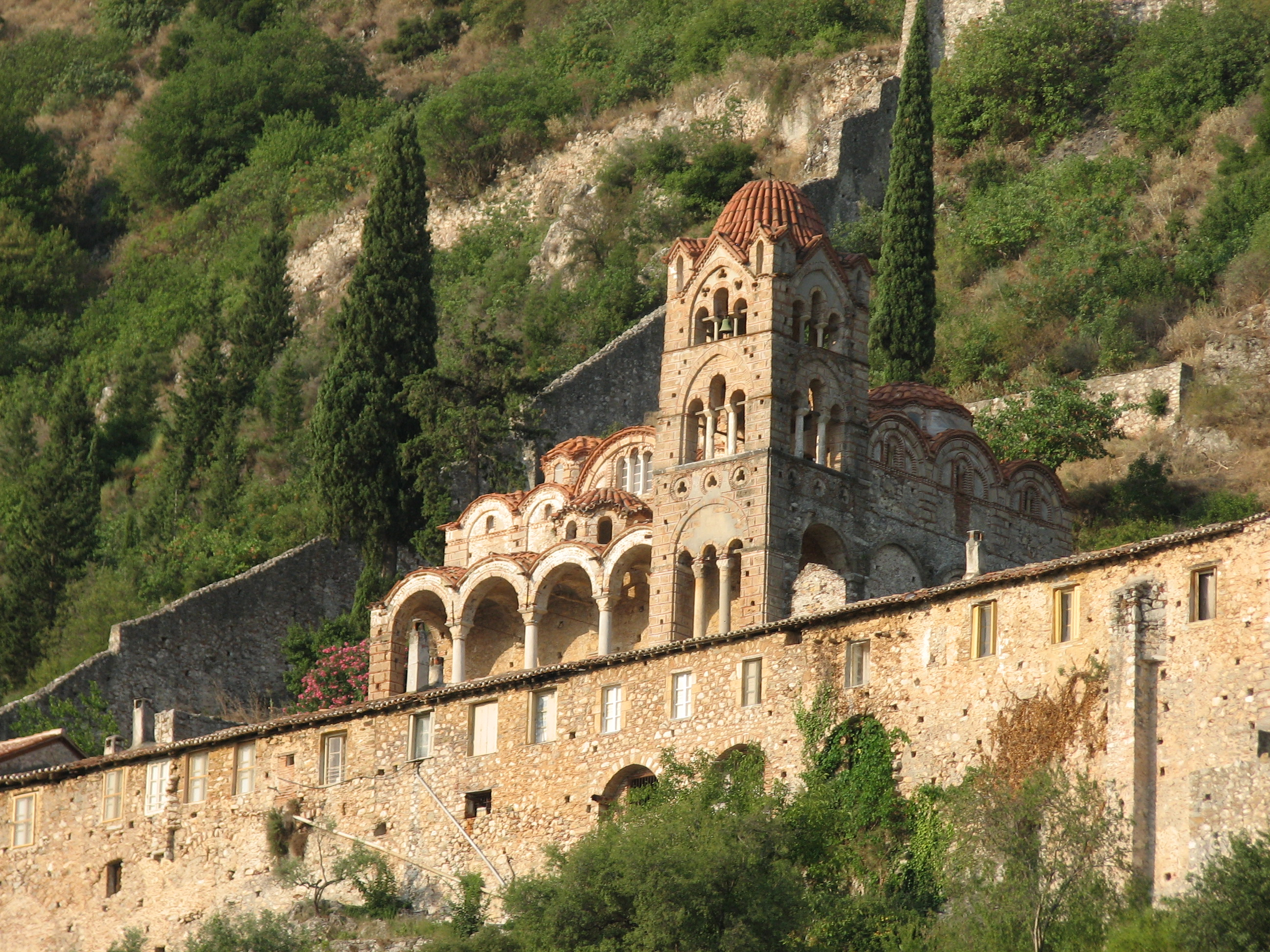
Pantanassa's monastery

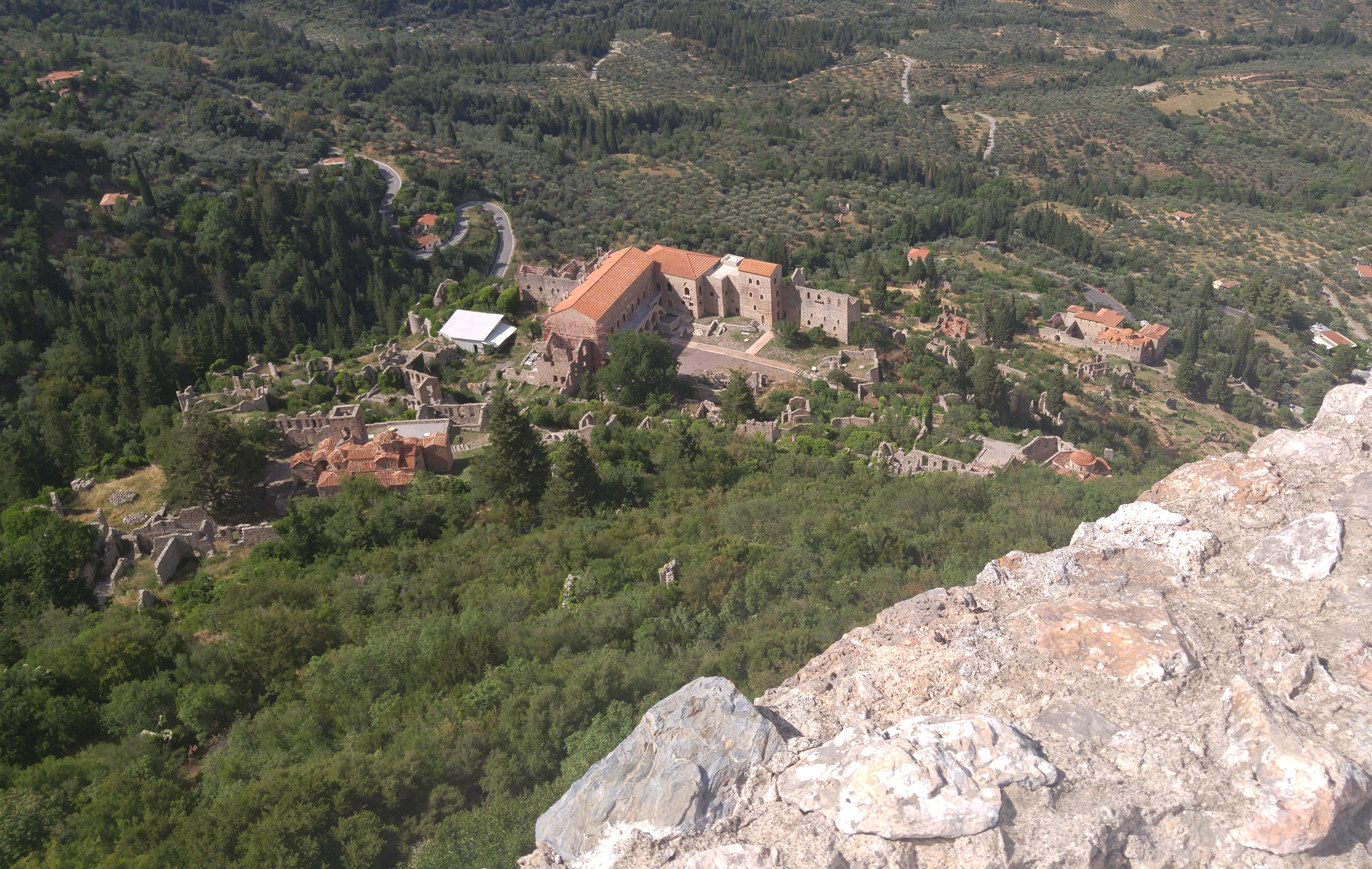
View from Villehardouin's Castle

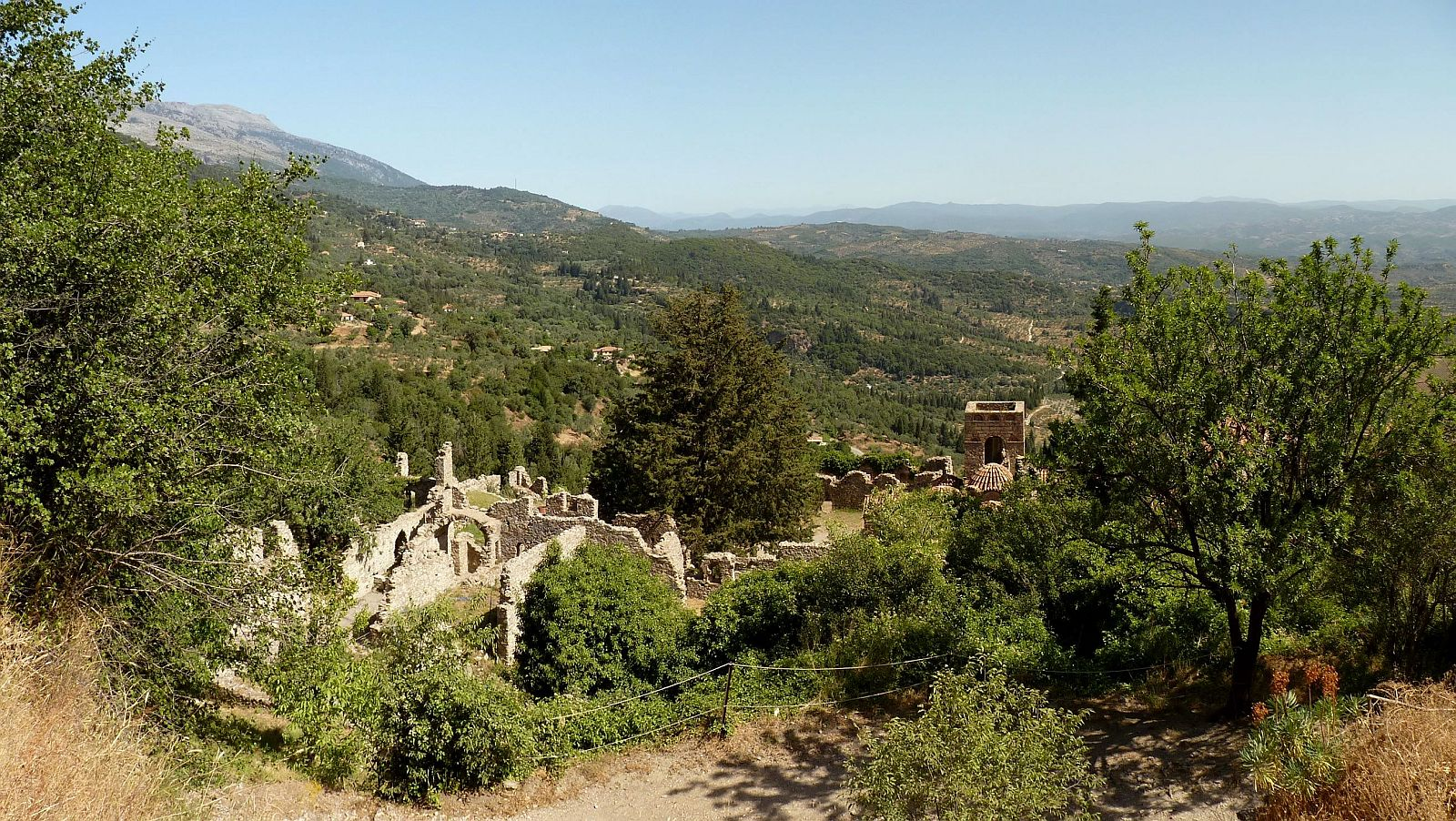
Upper City

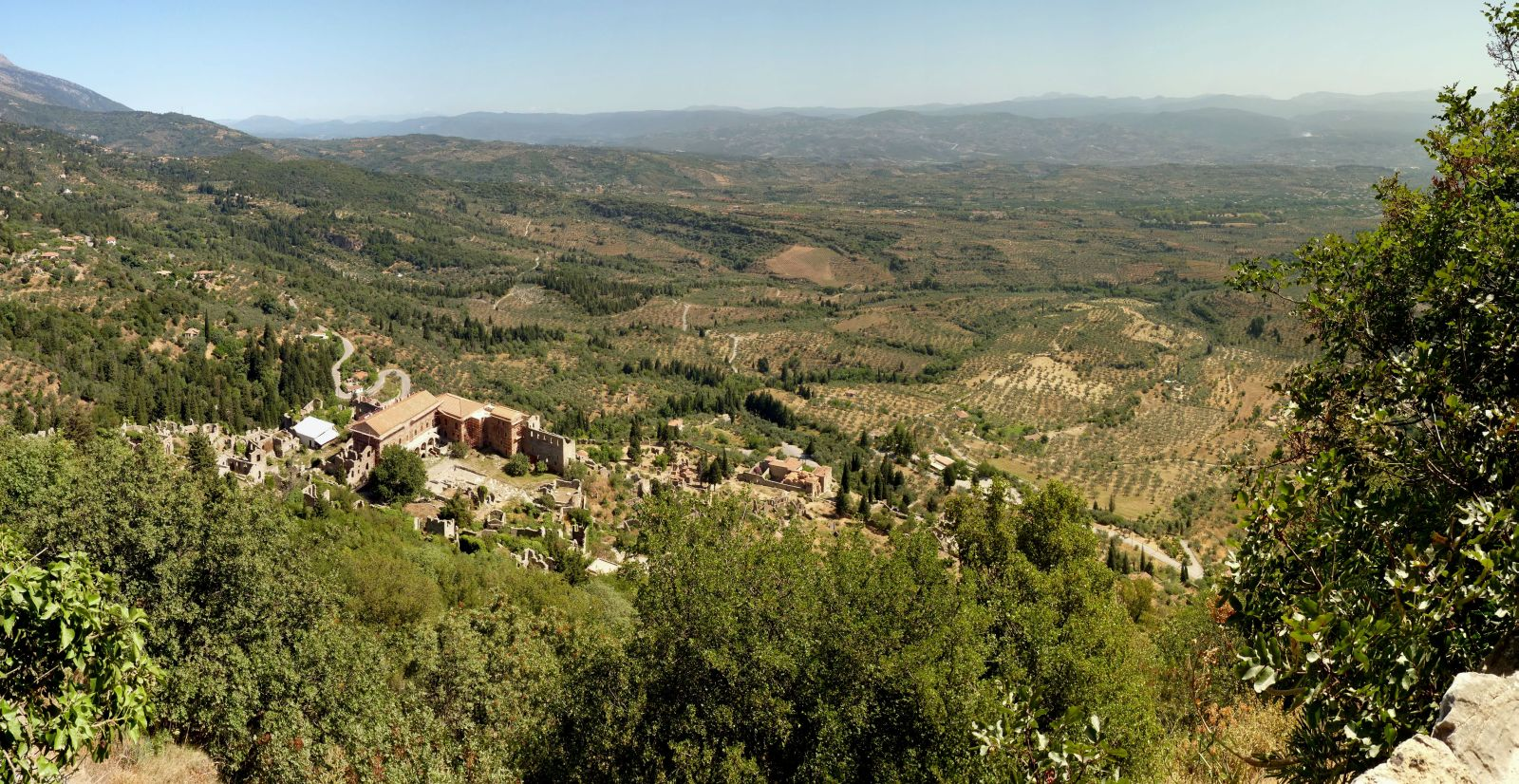
Middle City

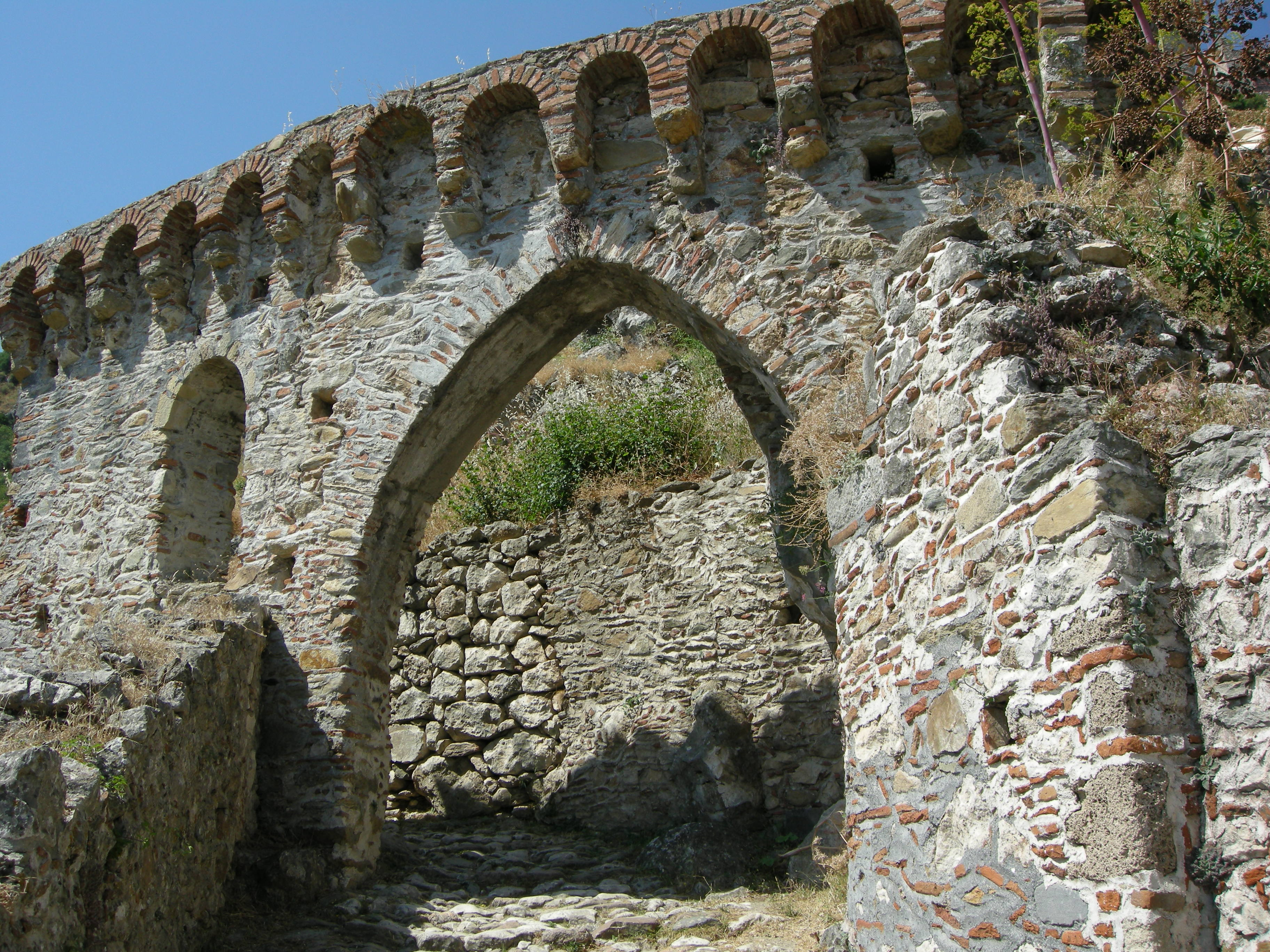
A Gate

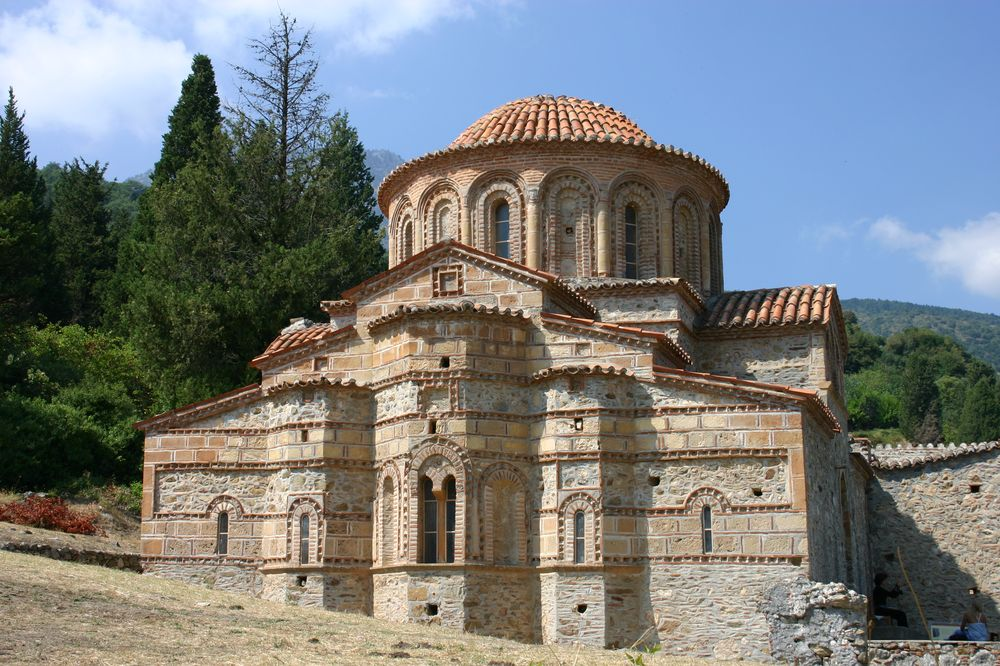
Agioi Theodoroi

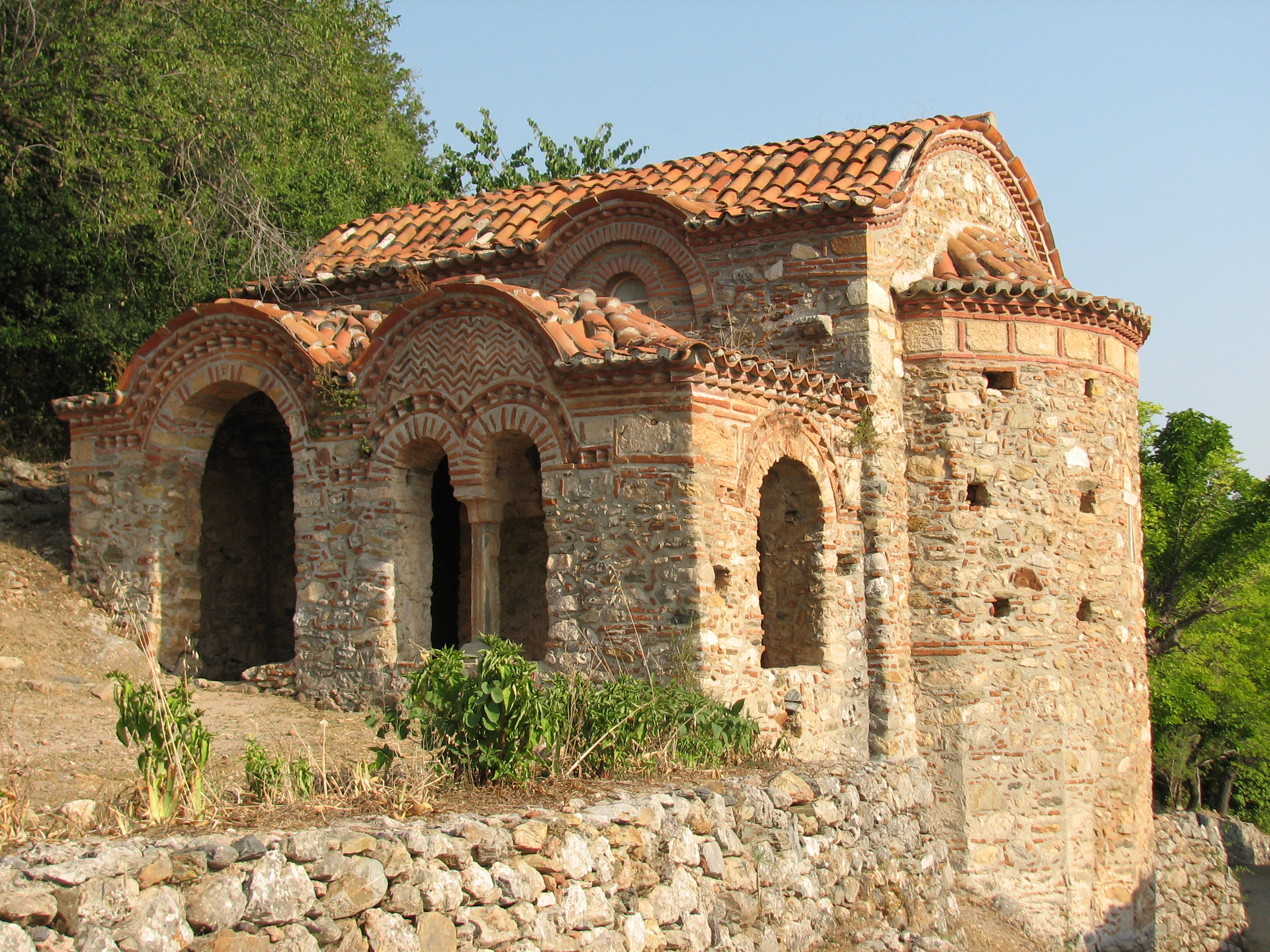
St. George

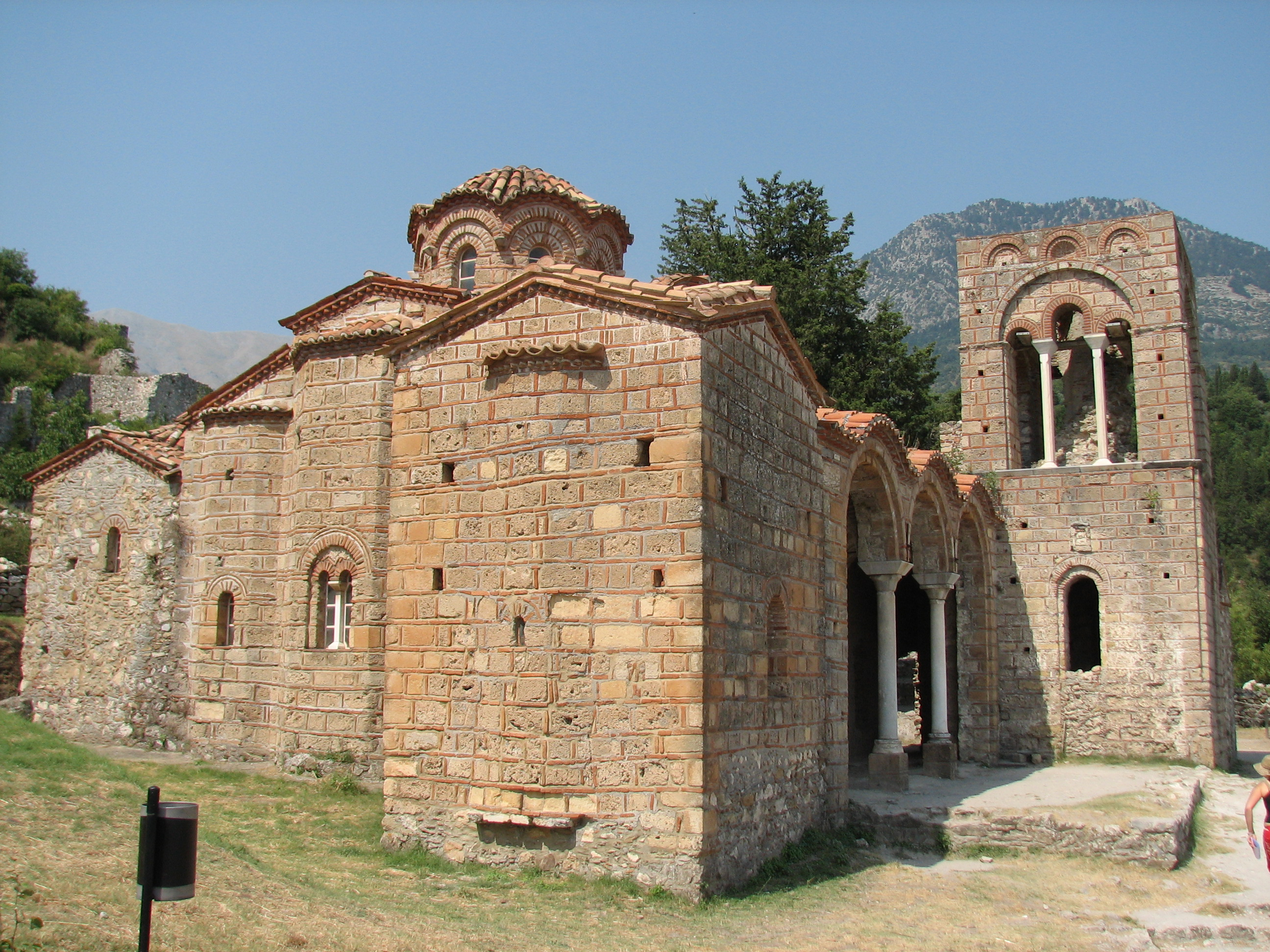
Agia Sofia

== See also ==
- List of settlements in Laconia
- Despotate of Mystras
- Stefanos Sinos

== Sources ==
- Bon, Antoine (1969). La Morée franque. Recherches historiques, topographiques et archéologiques sur la principauté d'Achaïe (in French). Paris: De Boccard.
- Gregory, Timothy E.; Ševčenko, Nancy Patterson (1991). "Mistra". In Kazhdan, Alexander (ed.). The Oxford Dictionary of Byzantium. Oxford University Press. pp. 1382–1385. ISBN 978-0-19-504652-6.
- Runciman, Steven (2009) [1980]. Lost Capital of Byzantium: The History of Mistra and the Peloponnese. Tauris Parke Paperbacks. ISBN 978-1-84511-895-2.
- Sinos, Stefanos (2021). The Late Byzantine Palace of Mystras and its Restoration. Athens: Kapon Editions.
