= Peribleptos Monastery, Mystras =

Coordinates: 37.0714°N 22.3708°E

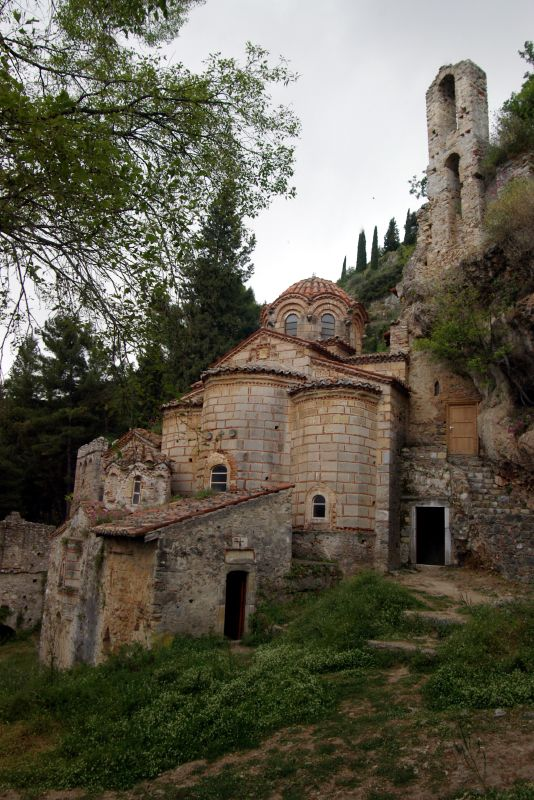
Peribleptos Monastery

The Peribleptos Monastery (Greek: Μονή Παναγίας Περιβλέπτου) is a late Byzantine-era monastery in Mystras, Greece. It was probably built in the mid-14th century by the first Despot of the Morea, Manuel Kantakouzenos, and named after one of the most celebrated monasteries of Byzantine Constantinople. The frescoes in the main church, dating between 1348 and 1380, are a very rare surviving late Byzantine cycle, crucial for the understanding of Byzantine art. It is named after St. Mary of Peribleptos, of Byzantine Constantinople (Istanbul). The monastery is built into the side of a cliff with a cave supporting the structure. This architectural style is known as the "Mystras style" and is prevalent in several churches and monasteries in the area, this style is typified by a resemblance to a castle. It is constructed of squared stones with inlaid tiles. The complexity and unique variations in the shape of the exterior create an interior surface inside the monastery that lends itself to the ethereal quality of the frescoes covering the walls. These have been described as "delicate and subdued" in Byzantine Architecture and Decoration (Hamilton 194-95)

== Frescoes and relics ==
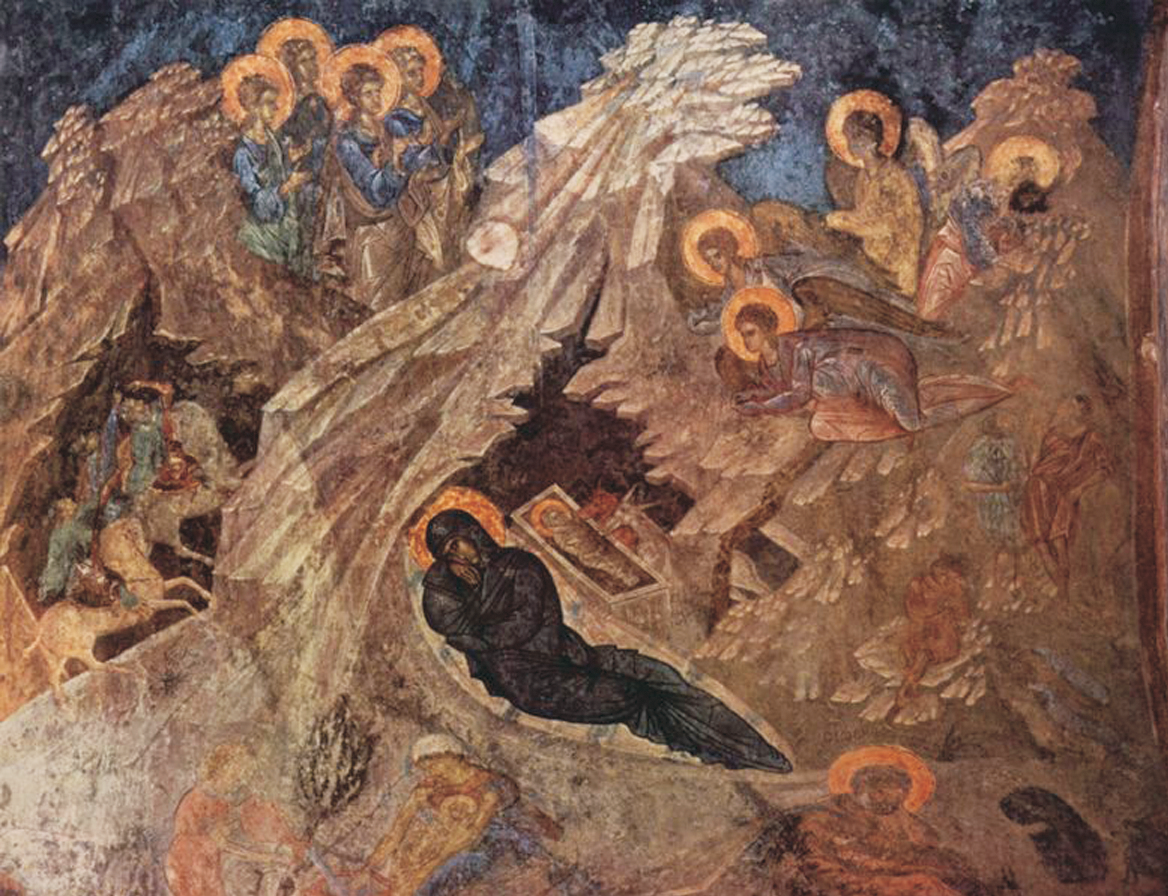
Birth of Jesus, Mystra, Peribleptos church frescoes

The extensive frescoes covering the interior of Peribleptos Monastery were created from 1350-1375. These works have been connected with the Cretan and Macedonian art schools(Hamilton 195). As art historian Annie Labatt says: "space and movement are treated with a Western feel in these frescoes". Because of the apse and other surfaces that create dramatic spatial surfaces, the artists' that painted these works had the advantage of displaying New Testament images with a perpetual flow with one fresco leading into another. It unclear who the artists' were. Dedication to the Virgin Mary has been proven as a prominent iconic focus in the religious art in churches and monasteries in Mystras.In Peribleptos Monastery, Relics include a fresco of Saint John the Baptist in a scene of The Baptism of Christ. Another notable relic is the head of Saint Gregory of Nazianzus, 4th-century Archbishop of Constantinople.

== Influence and importance ==
Peribleptos Monastery, Mystras which fell to the Ottoman Turks in 1460, Greece retained its Byzantine architecture and art, though it was surrounded by westerners (Cormack 198). The extensive art and architecture survived and some Byzantine artists were still commissioned. In Peripheral Byzantine Frescoes in Greece: The Problems of Their Connections, Karin M. Skawran asserts that even with the advancing technique of painterly art from other locations, art and painting retained a monastic appearance coming directly from Constantinople. Regardless of Political control and influence, the mosaics and earlier Christian paintings and frescoes of the Byzantine Empire left an indelible mark on the history and tradition of Christian Icons, relics, and art.

== Articles of interest ==
- Cormack, Robin, "Byzantine Art" Oxford: Oxford University Press, (2000) pp. 198–99
- Hamilton, J. Arnott, M.A., B.D., PhD., Hon. F.R.I.A.S. "Byzantium Art and Decoration" London: Jarrold and Sons, (1956) pp. 194–95
- Labatt, Annie. "Frescoes and Wall Painting in Late Byzantine Art." In Heilbrunn Timeline of Art History. New York: The Metropolitan Museum of Art, 2000– museum (October 2004) Web: Retrieved Mar 10, 2016
- Meagher, Jennifer. "Italian Painting of the Later Middle Ages." In Heilbrunn Timeline of Art History. New York: The Metropolitan Museum of Art, 2000 (September 2010)
- Skawran, Karin M.. "Peripheral Byzantine Frescoes in Greece: The Problem of Their Connections". British School at Athens Studies Vol.8, MOSAIC:Festschrift for A.H.S. Megaw (2001): 75–83. Web: Retrieved: Mar 10, 2016
