= Emmanouil Korres =

Greek architect and architectural historian

- Born: 1948 (age 77–78); Athens, Greece
- Education: National Technical University of Athens
- Occupation: Architect
- Practice: Restoration Architect, Civil Engineer and professor
- Projects: Restoration of the Acropolis of Athens

Emmanouil Korres (Greek: Εμμανουήλ Κορρές, born 1948) is a major Greek restoration architect, civil engineer and professor of architectural history at postgraduate studies at the National Technical University of Athens. Currently he is head of the Acropolis Restoration Service (YSMA) and a casual member of the Academy of Athens since 2017.

== Academic career ==
He studied architectural engineering at the National Technical University of Athens (1972), he did his postgraduate studies at the Technical University of Munich (TUM) (German: Technische Universität München) (1975–77), he earned a doctorate at the Free University of Berlin (German: Freie Universität Berlin, often abbreviated as FU Berlin or simply FU) (1991) and of the National Technical University of Athens (1992).

He worked as an engineer at the Acropolis Restoration Service (1975, 1977–1979) until he reached the position of the Head of the Department of Restorations at the Directorate for the Restoration of Ancient Monuments (1981). Then he was elected as Head for the "Parthenon" Project of the General Directorate of Antiquities and Cultural Heritage of the Ministry of Culture of Greece (1983–1999). He then achieved the position of professor at NTUA (1999–2015).

He has taught ancient architecture, historical topography and restoration at the National and Kapodistrian University of Athens, the University of Pennsylvania, the University of California, Berkeley and at universities and uesarch institutions across Europe, the Americas and Asia.

In specific he worked in Athens at the restoration of Erechteum, the temple of Dionysus, the theatre of Dionysus and mainly in the Parthenon. He has also worked at the Theatre of Lindos and at the temple of Apollo Epikourios in Bassae.

He is president of the Central Archaeological Council of Greece, member of the German Archaeological Institute (German: Deutsches Archäologisches Institut, DAI) and of the Koldewey Gesellschaft.

His latest work, filling the archaeological site of Acropolis with cement paths, has been controversial and caused protests and debate.

== Personal life ==
Emmanouil Korres was born in Kypseli, Athens, Greece at 1948. He grew up in Kypseli until he moved to Melissia. His father was a mechanic and his origins were from the Aegean island of Naxos. He is the middle child of a family of three children. His brother Dimitris Korres is also an architect and creator of the super-car of Korres Project.

== Honours received ==
Korres has received, among others, the following awards:

- Bronze Medal of the Academy of Athens (1989)
- Silver Medal of the Académie d'architecture (1995)
- Commander of the Order of the Phoenix (1998)
- Humboldt Prize (2003)
- Premio Internazionale di Archeologia, città di Ugento (Premio Zeus, 2006)
- International Feltrinelli Prize of the Accademia dei Lincei, Rome (2013)
- Full member of the Academy of Athens (2017)
