= List of members of the Academy of Athens =

This is a list of the members of the Academy of Athens, the national academy of Greece.

== List ==
1926 (Founding Members)

- Demetrios Eginitis
- Fokion Negris
- Rigas Nikolaidis
- Gerasimos Fokas
- Konstantinos Zengelis
- Georgios Remoundos (1878–1928)
- Angelos Ginis
- Konstantinos Ktenas
- Konstantinos Maltezos
- Ioannis Politis
- Konstantinos Savvas
- Georgios Sklavounos
- Emmanouil Emmanouil
- Alexandros Vournazos
- Konstantinos Veis
- Georgios Hatzidakis (1843–1941)
- Simos Menardos
- Panagiotis Kavvadias
- Christos Tsountas (1857 – 1934)
- Kostis Palamas (1859 –1943)
- Georgios Jakobides (1853 –1932)
- Georgios Sotiriadis
- Konstantinos Amantos
- Georgios Drossinis (1859 – 1951)
- Vassilios Kouremenos
- Aristomenis Provelengios
- Antonios Keramopoulos (1870 – 1960)
- Ioannis Kalitsounakis
- Georgios Oikonomos
- Georgios Sotiriou
- Anastasios Orlandos (1887 – 1979)
- Archbishop Chrysostomos I of Athens (1868 – 1938)
- Konstantinos Raktivan (1865 – 1935)
- Andreas Andreadis
- Nikolaos Politis (1872 –1942)
- Dimitrios Pappoulias
- Theophilos Voreas
- Michael Livadas
- Constantin Carathéodory (first elected member) (1873 –1950)

1927

- Georgios Streit
- Dimitrios Kambouroglou

1928

- Pavlos Nirvanas
- Konstantinos Dyovouniotis
- Alexandros Mazarakis-Ainian

1929

- Michael Katsaras
- Nikolaos Exarchopoulos
- Konstantinos Kourouniotis
- Timoleon Iliopoulos
- Georgios Ioakimoglou
- Sokratis Kougeas
- Konstantinos Rallis

1931

- Gregorios Xenopoulos
- Georgios Balis
- Spyridon Dontas
- Dimitrios Balanos

1932

- Aristotelis Kouzis

1933

- Marinos Geroulanos
- Dimitrios Lambadarios
- Stylianos Sepheriadis
- Konstantinos Triantafyllopoulos

1934

- Georgios Kyriakos

1935

- Spyros Melas

1936

- Kyriakos Varvaresos
- Konstantinos Dimitriadis

1938

- Zacharias Papantoniou
- Michael K. Stefanidis

1939

- Stylianos Lykoudis
- Archbishop Chrysanthus of Athens

1940

- Petros Kontos

1941

- Georgios Maridakis

1942

- Nikolaos Veis

1945

- Georgios Fokas-Kosmetatos
- Alexandros Diomidis
- Gregorios Papamichael
- Epameinondas Thomopoulos
- Sotiris Skipis
- Konstantinos Romeos
- Manolis Kalomiris

1946

- Panagiotis Zervos

1947

- Ioannis Trikkalinos
- Panagiotis Poulitsas

1948

- Chariton Charitonidis

1949

- Konstantinos Isaakidis
- Pavlos Mathiopoulos

1950

- Dionysios Kokkinos

1951

- Faidon Koukoules

1952

- Vasilios Aiginitis
- Xenophon Zolotas

1954

- Georgios Fotinos

1955

- Georgios Athanasiadis-Novas
- Errikos Skassis
- Ioannis Xanthakis
- Maximos Mitsopoulos
- Panagiotis Bratsiotis
- Jean Spiropoulos
- Spyridon Marinatos
- Christos Karouzos

1956

- Leonidas Zervas

1957

- Elias Venezis

1958

- Konstantinos Horemis
- Stratis Myrivilis

1959

- Panagiotis Kanellopoulos
- Ioannis Stamatakos
- Petros Petridis
- Oumvertos Argyros

1960

- Nikolaos Louvaris
- Dimitrios Fokas
- Vassilios Krimbas
- Konstantinos Papaioannou
- Ioannis Theodorakopoulos

1961

- Konstantinos Tsatsos

1962

- Amilkas Alivizatos

1963

- Caesar Alexopoulos

1965

- Antonios Sochos

1966

- Elias Mariolopoulos
- Andreas Xyngopoulos
- Nikolaos Louros
- Filon Vasileiou
- Othon Pylarinos
- Dimitris Pikionis
- Dionysios Zakythinos

1967

- Ioannis Charamis

1968

- Panagiotis Papatsonis
- Michael Tombros
- Michail Stasinopoulos
- Grigorios Kasimatis

1969

- Petros Haris

1970

- George E. Mylonas
- Georgios Pantazis
- Menelaos Pallantios
- Georgios Megas
- Vassilios Malamos
- Panagiotis Zepos

1973

- Pericles Theocharis
- Nikolaos Roussopoulos

1974

- Nikos Hadjikyriakos-Ghikas
- Georgios Tsatsos
- Angelos Terzakis
- Constantine Trypanis
- Ioannis Karmiris
- Georgios Michailidis-Nouaros

1976

- Angelos Angelopoulos
- Vasos Falireas

1977

- Loukas Mousoulos
- Athanasios Petsalis-Diomidis
- Solon Kydoniatis
- Pandelis Prevelakis
- Georgios Merikas

1978

- Konstantinos Bonis
- Constantin Eustathiades

1979

- Ioannis Toumbas
- Petros Vassiliadis

1980

- Linos Politis
- Manolis Hatzidakis
- Konstantinos Romaios
- Ioannis Pappas
- Ioannis Sontis
- Evangelos Papanoutsos

1981

- Themistoklis Diannelidis
- Spyridon Skarpalezos

1982

- Manousos Manousakas
- Ioannis Papadakis
- Michail Sakellariou

1983

- Georgios Vlachos
- Angelos Galanopoulos
- Agapitos Tsopanakis

1984

- Pavlos Sakellaridis
- Konstantinos Despotopoulos
- Evangelos Moutsopoulos
- Apostolos Sachinis
- Nikolaos Matsaniotis
- Georgios Karagounis

1985

- Angelos Vlachos

1986

- Georgios Tenekidis
- Nikolaos Artemiadis
- Tasos Athanasiadis

1987

- Nikiforos Vrettakos
- Georgios Mitsopoulos

1989

- Ioannis Georgakis
- Grigorios Skalkeas
- Nicolas Valticos

1990

- Nicolaos Conomis
- Konstantinos Tountas

1991

- Chrysanthos Christou
- Spyros Iakovidis

1992

- Yiangos Pesmazoglou

1993

- Aristovoulos Manessis
- Panayiotis Tetsis
- Panos Ligomenidis
- John Zizioulas, Metropolitan of Pergamos
- Markos Siotis

1994

- Charalambos Antoniadis
- Costas Stefanis
- Alexander Cambitoglou
- Konstantinos Grollios

1995

- Athanasios Panagos

1996

- Athanasios Kambylis
- Pavlos Mylonas

1997

- George Contopoulos
- Dimitri Nanopoulos
- Galateia Saranti, first woman member
- Dimitrios Trichopoulos
- Emmanouil Roukounas

1998

- Konstantinos Drakatos
- Angeliki Laiou

1999

- Iakovos Kambanellis
- Antonios Kounadis

2000

- Panagiotis Vokotopoulos
- Vasilios Petrakos
- Apostolos Georgiadis
- Georgios Parissakis
- Themistoklis Hatziioannou

2001

- Loucas Christophorou

2002

- Epaminondas Spiliotopoulos
- Kiki Dimoula
- Dimitris Skarvelis
- Konstantinos Krimbas

2003

- Nicholas Ambraseys
- Georgios Lavvas
- Konstantinos Svolopoulos

2005

- Stamatios Krimigis
- Athanassios Fokas
- Spiros Evangelatos
- Menelaos Tourtoglou

2006

- Lucas Papademos

2007

- Christos Zerefos
- Nicolaos Valsamakis

2008

- Thanasis Valtinos
- Dimitris Mytaras

2010

- Anna Benaki-Psarouda
- Konstantinos Vagenas

2011

- Stephanos Imellos
- Haralambos Roussos
- Michael Stathopoulos
- Yiannis Parmakelis
- Antonios Rengakos
- Michalis Tiverios
- Chryssa Maltezou

2013

- George Kollias
- Theodoros Papanghelis
- Nikolaos Androulakis

2014

- Nikiforos Diamandouros
- Theodore Antoniou

2015

- Miltiadis Hatzopoulos
- Christopher Pissarides

2016

- Costas Synolakis
- Vassilis Rapanos
- Angelos Delivorrias
- Emmanuel Gdoutos

2017

- Dimitris Thanos
- Haralampos Moutsopoulos
- Emmanouil Korres

2018

- Alexander Nehamas

2020

- Paschalis Kitromilides

2021

- Andreas Tzakis
- Alecos Levidis
- Antonia Trichopoulou
