= Khariton =

Khariton is a Russian language variant of the Greek name Chariton. It may be both a given name and a surname. It also gave rise to a number of patronymic surnames: Kharitonov, Kharitonenko, Kharitonenkov.

Notable people with the name include:

== Given name ==
- Khariton Agrba, Russian professional boxer
- Khariton Chebotaryov (1746-1815), Russian academic
- Khariton Korotkevich (1882–1904), pseudonym of Haritina Korotkevich, Russian female soldier in disguise
- Khariton Laptev (1700–1763), Russian naval officer
- Khariton Platonov (1842-1907), Russian painter

== Surname ==
- Boris Khariton (1876-1942), Russian journalist, publisher and editor
- Yulii Khariton (1904–1996), Russian physicist

== See also ==
- 9263 Khariton, an asteroid
- Chariton (disambiguation)
- Charyton
- Hariton
- Kharko
