= Chariton (disambiguation) =

Chariton may refer to:

== People ==
- Chariton (name), a name, both given and family
- Chariton, lover of Melanippus, whose mutual love moved even the cruel tyrant Phalaris
- Chariton of Aphrodisias, ancient Greek author
- Chariton the Confessor (died c. 350), saint and ascetic
- Chariton of Constantinople (died 1179), Ecumenical Patriarch of Constantinople
- Chariton Charitonidis (1878–1954), Greek classical philologist
- Jordan Chariton (born 1986), American reporter
- Dan and Stacy Chariton (fl. 2013), American screenwriters

== Places ==
- Chariton, Iowa
- Chariton, Missouri
- Chariton River
- Chariton County, Missouri
- Chariton Township, Appanoose County, Iowa

== See also ==
- Hariton
- Khariton (disambiguation)
