= Evangelatos =

Evangelatos is a surname. Notable people with the surname include:

- Antiochos Evangelatos (1903–1981), Greek composer and conductor
- Costas Evangelatos (born 1957), Greek poet and artist
- Greg Evangelatos, American para-alpine skier
- Spiros Evangelatos (1940–2017), Greek theatre director and academic
