= Antonia Trichopoulou =

Greek nutrition epidemiologist

Antonia Trichopoulou (Greek: Αντωνία Τριχοπούλου; born 1938) is a nutrition epidemiologist, specialising in the study of the health effects of the Mediterranean diet. She has been called the "mother of the Mediterranean Diet". Trichopoulou is a Professor Emeritus of the School of Medicine of the University of Athens and the President of the Hellenic Health Foundation.

She has published more than 900 scientific papers and was president of the Federation of European Nutrition Societies (FENS). For her contributions, she was elected in December 2021 a full member of the Academy of Athens in the Chair of "Medical Sciences: Epidemiology and Public Health". In 2003 she was awarded the Golden Cross of Honor by the President of the Greek Republic.

Her late husband was Dimitrios Trichopoulos, a cancer epidemiologist.

== Early life and education ==
Trichopoulou was born in Athens, Greece. In 1961, she graduated as a medical doctor from the Medical School of the University of Athens. In 1963, she received her degree from the Athens School of Health and in 1965 she completed the specialty of biopathology (microbiology). She was awarded her doctorate in medicine from the University of Athens.

== Career ==
In 1976 Trichopoulou became a professor of medicine at the University of Athens, in the field of biological chemistry. She was appointed professor of nutrition and biochemistry at the Athens School of Public Health in 1977 and served as Dean of the School from 1985 to 1987.

In 1994 she was awarded the title of adjunct professor of nutrition at the Harvard School of Public Health, Boston, USA. During her career at the Athens School of Public Health (1990–1999) and then at the Laboratory of Hygiene and Epidemiology of the University of Athens (2000–2019), she headed the World Health Organization's Collaborating Centre for Nutrition.

In 2006, she co-founded the non-profit Hellenic Health Foundation, where she has been President since 2014. For her contributions, she was elected in December 2021 a full member of the Academy of Athens in the Chair of "Medical Sciences: Epidemiology and Public Health".

Trichopoulou's research mainly focuses on nutrition and particularly, the Mediterranean diet. She developed the first standardized score for adherence to the traditional Mediterranean diet, the Mediterranean Diet Score (MDS). The MDS, or its variations, has been used in hundreds of studies evaluating the health effects of adherence to the Mediterranean diet all over the world.

== Awards and honors ==
Trichopoulou has received numerous awards and honors, including:

- Golden Cross of Honor, President of the Greek Republic, 2003
- Award for her outstanding nutritionist career, Federation of European Nutrition Societies (FENS), 2011
- Full member, Chair of Medical Sciences: Epidemiology and Public Health, Academy of Athens, 2021

== Further engagements ==
Apart from her published manuscripts and her engagements in various scientific bodies, she has also discussed her work in interviews and podcasts.
