= Korotkevich =

Korotkevich (Russian: Короткевич) is a gender-neutral Russian-language surname. Belarusian variant: Karatkievich, Ukrainian: Korotkevych, Polish: Korotkiewicz. Notable people with the surname include:

- Gennady Korotkevich (born 1994), Belarusian sport programmer
- Haritina Korotkevich, (1882–1908), Russian soldier and heroine
- Larisa Korotkevich (born 1967), Russian discus thrower
- Uladzimir Karatkievich (1930–1984), Belarusian romantic writer
- Yevgeny Korotkevich (1918–1994), Soviet scientist and polar explorer
