= Konstantinos Ktenas =

Greek geologist, mineralogist and volcanologist

Konstantinos Antonios Ktenas
- Born: 1884
- Died: January 25, 1935
- Education: University of Athens (B.Sc.); University of Leipzig (PhD, 1907)
- Scientific career
- Workplaces: National and Kapodistrian University of Athens
- Thesis: Die Einlagerungen im krystallinen Gebirge der Kykladen auf Syra und Sifnos (1907)
- Doctoral advisor: Ferdinand Zirkel

Konstantinos Ktenas (Greek: Κωνσταντίνος Κτενάς) (1884–1935) was a Greek geologist, mineralogist and volcanologist, and Professor at the University of Athens. He was president of the International Association for Volcanology from 1933 until his death in 1935.

== Biography and career ==
Ktenas was born in Athens, Greece in 1884, into a wealthy Athenian family. His ancestors included Panagis Ktenas, who led the siege of the Acropolis in 1821. Ktenas graduated in natural sciences from the University of Athens, and went abroad for his post-graduate studies. He completed a doctorate at the University of Leipzig in 1907, with a thesis on the geology of the crystalline rocks of Sifnos and Syros, and then spent one year at the mining academy of Freiberg in Saxony. In 1908, Ktenas returned to Greece and was appointed as a lecturer of mineralogy and geology at the National University. In 1912, Ktenas was appointed as professor of mineralogy and petrology, and director of the mineralogical museum, replacing Konstantinos M. Mitsopoulos who had been dismissed from the university in 1910, following the Gaudi coup of 1909.

In October 1912, Ktenas was drafted to join the military campaign against the Ottoman Empire in the First Balkan War. Ktenas used this opportunity to travel to areas that were newly under Greek control. He drafted new maps of areas including Thessaloniki, Vodena, Monastir, Chalkidiki and Kavala. Ktenas’ ambition was to create a Greek Geological Survey. In 1914, he led an expedition to the island of Chios, for geological mapping and mineral prospecting. He continued to press the Greek authorities for the establishment of a national geological survey, and in July 1917 published a "Preliminary Study on the founding and organisation of a Greek Geological Survey" that would involve a "systematic geological exploration of the Greek Lands". In the early 1920s, Ktenas became involved in discussions around Greek oil deposits, but the project foundered in the face of political and military instability, and Ktenas lost influence.

In 1926, Ktenas was one of the founding members of the Academy of Athens, and was secretary for the academy's publications from 1928 to 1935. From 1925 to 1928, Ktenas led the mapping, monitoring and reporting of a new eruption on the volcanic island of Santorini. In 1933 he was elected president of the newly named International Association for Volcanology. Ktenas died in Athens, on January 25, 1935.

== Legacy ==
A secondary zinc copper sulphate mineral was named Ktenasite in his honour in 1950 by his former colleague, P. Kokkoros. Ktenasite was first described from the Lavrion mining district, near Athens.

== Bibliography ==
- Karampatsos, Christos; Tzokas, Spyros; Velegrakis, Giorgos; Harlaftis, Gelina (2022). "Is There Oil in Greece? Oil Exploration and Scientific Conflict during the First Years of the Greek Geological Survey (1917–1925)". The Historical Review. 19: 77–112.
