= Paschalis Kitromilides =

Cypriot political scientist and university professor

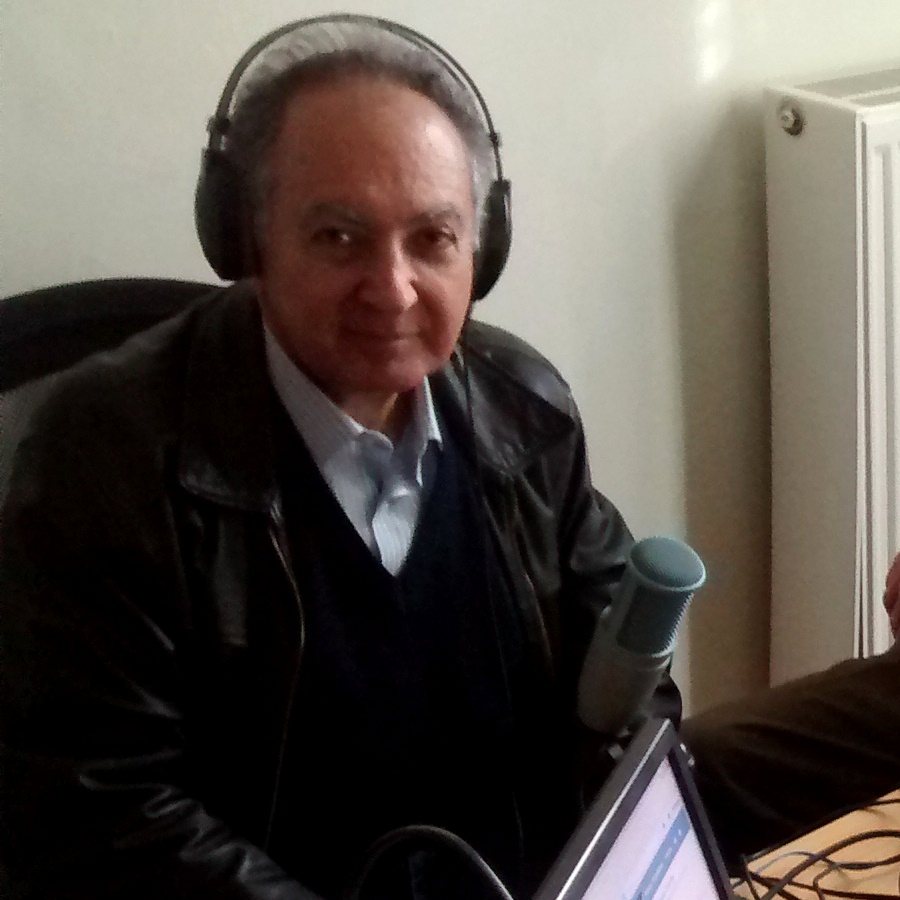
Paschalis Kitromilides

Paschalis M. Kitromilides (born 5 November 1949) in Nicosia, Cyprus, is a Greek-Cypriot political scientist and intellectual historian. His expertise is on the history of political thought. His special field of research is the Enlightenment in South-eastern Europe, focusing on the central role of its Neohellenic component. He is a professor of political science at the National and Kapodistrian University of Athens since 1983. He was elected full member of the Academy of Athens on 6 February 2020.

== Education and career ==
Prof. Kitromilides was born on 5 November 1949 in Nicosia, then in British Cyprus, the first son of philologists Michael and Magda Kitromilides. After secondary studies at the Pancyprian Gymnasium and military service in the Cypriot National Guard in 1968-69, he earned a Fulbright scholarship allowing him to study in the United States.

He earned his BA in political science and modern European history from Wesleyan University (B.A. with Highest Honours in Government, 1972). He holds an MA (1975) and a PhD in political science from Harvard University where he studied under Michael Walzer and Judith Shklar, two distinguished American scholars of their time. He completed his degree in 1979 with his dissertation bearing the title, “Tradition, Enlightenment and Revolution: Ideological Change in Eighteenth and Nineteenth Century Greece.”

Prior to assuming his position at the University of Athens (1983), Prof. Kitromilides taught at Harvard University (1978-1979). He has also taught at Brandeis University (1987), and has held visiting appointments at the University of Cambridge (1989-1990, as Visiting Fellow and Life Member of Clare Hall), the University of Oxford (1993,1997), the École des Hautes Études en Sciences Sociales in Paris (1990, 2001), the European University Institute in Florence (2010) and the Harvard University Centre for Italian Renaissance Studies Villa I Tatti, Florence (2012).

He is a board member of the Hellenic Parliament Academic Council (2004–present) and director of the Centre for Asia Minor Studies (1980–present, as successor of Melpo Merlier), past director of the Centre for Modern Greek Studies at the National Hellenic Research Foundation in Athens (2000-2011) and past president of the Cyprus Research Centre (2006-2009), the European Society for the History of Political Thought (2009-2011) and the Hellenic Political Science Association (1988-1992). He regularly writes in the Greek weekly newspaper To Vima.

== Scholarship ==
Since his doctoral dissertation (Harvard University, 1979) Kitromilides has devoted his research to the study of Modern Greek Enlightenment, an academic field that was initially developed by Konstantinos Dimaras. While Dimaras was a pioneer in singling out the phenomenon and its main representatives, as well as in referring to their literary dimensions, Kitromilides turned his analysis to political ideas and the context of historical vicissitudes, social dynamics and western Enlightenment influences which could lead a traditional Balkan, Ottoman-dominated society to modernity and change (see in Publications below, Enlightenment and Revolution, “Imagined Communities”, Enlightenment, Nationalism, Orthodoxy).

His adherence to the Cambridge School of intellectual history and the history of political thought was not unconformable to his emphasis on leading figures in Greek political and cultural affairs, to whom he dedicated extended articles, collective works and monographs (Adamantios Korais and the European Enlightenment, The Complete Works of Rigas Velestinlis, The Enlightenment as Social Criticism. Iosipos Moisiodax and Greek Culture in the Eighteenth Century).

Over the years, Kitromilides developed interests in the intellectual and cultural horizon of Greek post-Byzantine cultural tradition since 1453, which he perceived to be grounded in Orthodoxy and the Greek language, elements that contributed to a Commonwealth under the guidance of the Orthodox Church and the Patriarchate of Constantinople (see in Publications below, The Orthodox Commonwealth, “Enlightenment and Greek Cultural Tradition”, “Orthodoxy and the West”). In this context Kitromilides placed in particular the study of Asia Minor Hellenism, that is, the ecclesiastical, social and intellectual experience of Asia Minor Greek populations covering the modern era till the expulsion of these communities from Asia Minor in the 1920s. That field of research he was able to develop through his extensive publishing and editorial activity at the Centre for Asia Minor Studies.

Kitromilides’s main preoccupation throughout his academic career was to introduce the canon of Western political thought into Greek academia. While early modern and modern Greek reflection remained the primary subject of his publications and research, Kitromilides has devoted almost his entire teaching at the University of Athens, as well as some university textbooks, to the grand theorists of classical political science from Plato to the Enlightenment.

Kitromilides has also written on Cypriot history and political affairs, his native land’s political and historical complexity serving as the basis for many of his academic publications. In 2002 he issued a prosopography of Cypriot intellectuals and in 2008 he launched a major research and editorial project on sources of Cypriot learning (1571-1878) published by the National Hellenic Research Foundation.

== Honors ==
- Member of the Academy of Athens (6 February 2020)
- Doctor honoris causa, University of Bucharest (2013)
- Doctor honoris causa, Democritus University of Thrace
- Honorary Fellow, Institut d’Études Sud-Est Européennes, Romanian Academy (2011)
- Chevalier de l’Ordre des Palmes académiques, France (2003)
- Commander of the Order of Honour, Hellenic Republic (2015)

== Publications ==
Prof. Kitromilides's publications in English include:

- The Enlightenment as Social Criticism. Iosipos Moisiodax and Greek Culture in the Eighteenth Century (Princeton: Princeton University Press, 1992);
- Enlightenment Nationalism Orthodoxy (Variorum, 1994);
- “Orthodoxy and the West. Reformation to Enlightenment”, Cambridge History of Christianity Volume 5: Eastern Christianity, ed. M. Angold (Cambridge, 2006);
- An Orthodox Commonwealth. Symbolic Legacies and Cultural Encounters in Southeastern Europe (Variorum Collected Studies Series, Ashgate, 2007);
- From Republican Polity to National Community. Reconsiderations of Enlightenment Political Thought (Voltaire Foundation, 2003);
- Adamantios Korais and the European Enlightenment (Voltaire Foundation, 2010);
- Eleftherios Venizelos. The Trials of Statesmanship (Edinburgh University Press, 2006);
- Enlightenment and Revolution. The Making of Modern Greece (Harvard University Press, 2013);
- Enlightenment and Religion in the Orthodox World (Voltaire Foundation, 2016).

His publications in Greek include:

- Νεοελληνικός Διαφωτισμός. Οι πολιτικές και κοινωνικές ιδέες (Athens: Cultural Foundation of the National Bank of Greece, 1996)
- Ρήγα Βελεστινλή: Άπαντα τα σωζόμενα, general editor: P. M. Kitromilides (Athens: The Greek Parliament, 2000-2002)
- Η Γαλλική Επανάσταση και η Νοτιοανατολική Ευρώπη. Second edition (Athens: Poreia, 2000)
- Κυπριακή Λογιοσύνη, 1571-1878 (Nicosia: Cyprus Research Centre, 2002)
- Ιώσηπος Μοισιόδαξ. Οι συντεταγμένες της βαλκανικής σκέψης τον δέκατο όγδοο αιώνα. Second edition (Athens: Cultural Foundation of the National Bank of Greece, 2004)
- Πολιτικοί στοχαστές των νεοτέρων χρόνων. Βιογραφικές και ερμηνευτικές προσεγγίσεις. Sixth edition (Athens: Poreia, 2007)
- John Locke, Δεύτερη Πραγματεία περί Κυβερνήσεως [Second Treatise of Government], introduction–translation–commentary by P. M. Kitromilides. Second edition (Athens: Polis, 2010)
- Πολιτική Επιστήμη. Οι περιπέτειες μιας ιδέας (Athens: Polis, 2013)
- Νεότερη Πολιτική Θεωρία. Fifth edition (Athens: Nomike Bibliotheke, 2014)
- Το όραμα της ελευθερίας στην ελληνική κοινωνία. Από την πολιτική σκέψη στην πολιτική πράξη (Athens: Poreia, 1992)

His books have also been translated into Russian, Romanian and Bulgarian.
