= Chariton (name) =

Chariton (Greek: Χαρίτων) is a name of Byzantine Greek origin (see Chariton the Confessor) meaning "well-affected, benevolent".

In modern times is used as both as given name and surname, it several spellings, depending on the language, including Hariton, Charyton, Khariton. The feminine form is (variously transliterated) Charitina/Haritina/Kharitina.
