= Kharitonov =

Kharitonov (Russian: Харитонов), feminine: Kharitonova (Харитонова) is a Russian patronymic surname derived from the male given name Khariton and literally means Khariton's. Ukrainian form: Kharytonov. Notable people with the surname include:

== Kharitonov ==
- Aleksandr Kharitonov (politician) (born 1971), Ukrainian politician
- Aleksandr Kharitonov (footballer) (born 1983), Russian footballer
- Aleksandr Kharitonov (ice hockey) (born 1976), Russian ice hockey player
- Alexandr Kharitonov (chess player) (born 1986), Russian chess player
- Andrei Kharitonov (1959–2019), Ukrainian actor and film director
- Dmitry Kharitonov (1896–1970), Russian arachnologist
- Ivan Kharitonov
- Ivans Haritonovs
- Leonid Kharitonov (1930–1987), Soviet actor
- Leonid Kharitonov (1933–2017), Russian singer
- Mark Kharitonov (1937–2024), Russian writer and translator
- Nikolay Kharitonov (born 1948), Russian politician
- Sergei Kharitonov (born 1980), Russian heavyweight mixed martial arts fighter
- Yevgeny Kharitonov (born 1946), Russian politician
- Yevgeny Kharitonov (1941–1981), Soviet poet

== Kharitonova ==
- Anna Kharitonova (born 1985), Russian judoka
- Marta Kharitonova (born 1984), Russian slalom canoer
- Olga Kharitonova (born 1990), Russian sprinter
- Olgerta Kharitonova (born 1959), Russian Feminist
- Svetlana Kharitonova (1932–2012), Russian actress

== See also ==
- Kharitonenkov
