= Chariton Charitonidis =

Greek philologist and university professor (1878-1954)

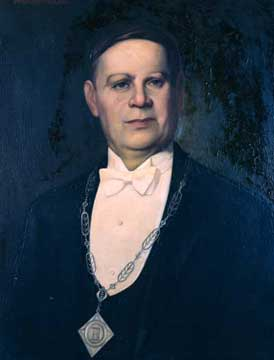
Chariton Charitonidis

Chariton Charitonidis (Greek: Χαρίτων Χαριτωνίδης; born 1878 Makri, Asia Minor [today Fethiye, Turkey] – died 8 or 9 May 1954, Athens, Greece) was a Greek classical philologist, professor at the Aristotle University of Thessaloniki and member of the Academy of Athens.

== Life ==
Chariton Charitonidis was born in Makri, Asia Minor. He was educated at the Pythagorian Gymnasium of Samos, but graduated from the 3rd Gymnasium of Athens. He then studied philology at the University of Athens. There he was associated with the circle of Professor Konstantinos S. Kontos. He received his degree in 1902. In 1909 he was awarded a Ph.D. of the Faculty of Philosophy at the University of Athens. In 1907 he was appointed to Arsakeio where he remained until 1926.

In 1926 Chariton Charitonidis became professor at the University of Thessaloniki. He was the first to teach Ancient Greek at this newly founded university. He was the one who inspired the word emblem of the university «Μούσαις Χάρισι Θῦε» (="Sacrifice to the Muses and Graces"). He retired in 1940, having been a dean of the School of Philosophy twice. In 1948 he was elected a full member of the Academy of Athens. He died at the age of 76 from a heart attack.

== Publications ==
Chariton Charitonidis published many grammatical, critical and interpretative remarks to ancient writers. The full list of his works can be found in the Yearbook of the School of Philosophy, Aristotle University of Thessaloniki, vol. 7, pp. vii-xviii (1957, in Greek). PDF versions of some of his works can be retrieved using the online search engine of the Library of the Aristotle University of Thessaloniki.

=== Books ===
- 1904. Ποικίλα φιλολογικά. Αθήνα: Π. Δ. Σακελλαρίου (in Greek)
- 1935. Απόρρητα. Θεσσαλονίκη: Μιχ. Τριανταφύλλου (pen name: Εύιος Ληναίου, in Greek)
- 1938. Κριτικά και γραμματικά (=Επιστημονική Επετηρίς εκδιδομένη υπό της Φιλοσοφικής Σχολής του Πανεπιστημίου Θεσσαλονίκης 4). Θεσσαλονίκη: Κορν. Οδ. Θεοδωρίδου (in Greek).

For more books see full list of works

=== Articles ===
- 1910. Έλεγχος του Βερναρδακείου λεξικού. Αθηνά 22. (in Greek).
- 1912. Έλεγχος του Βερναρδακείου λεξικού: μέρος δεύτερον. Αθηνά 24. (in Greek).
- 1913. Περί της ενικής κλητικής των εις ης : ληγόντων ονομάτων της πρώτης κλίσεως. Αθηνά 25. (in Greek).
- 1914. Παρατηρήσεις: εις τα υπό του E. Legrand και A. Passow εκδεδομένα δημώδη ελληνικά άσματα. Αθηνά 26. (in Greek).
- 1914. Χρήμα-Χρήματα apud Herodotum. Mnemosyne. Bibliotheca Philologica Batava.
- 1915. Ερμηνεία και θεραπεία Ηροδοτείου χωρίου. Αθηνά 27. (in Greek).
- 1915. Miscellanea. Mnemosyne. Bibliotheca Philologica Batava.
- 1927. Σύμμεικτα κριτικά. Επιστημονική Επετηρίς εκδιδομένη υπό της Φιλοσοφικής Σχολής του Πανεπιστημίου Θεσσαλονίκης 1 (in Greek).
- 1927. Πέτρος Σ. Φωτιάδης. Αθηνά 39 (in Greek).
- 1930. Varia ad Varios. Επετηρίς Εταιρείας Βυζαντινών Σπουδών 7.

For more articles see full list of works
