= Duncan W. Clark =

American health specialist

Duncan William Clark, MD (1910 – 5 August 2007) was an American public health and preventive medicine specialist. He is best known for advocating the addition of fluoride to the New York City's water supply to prevent tooth decay.

== Education ==
Clark was born in New York City. He studied at Fordham University and gained a medical degree at Long Island College Hospital Medical School in 1936.

== Career ==
Clark served as Dean of the Long Island College of Medicine. He chaired the Department of Environmental Medicine and Community Health at the State University of New York, Brooklyn from 1951 to 1978, becoming a professor emeritus in 1982.

He edited a textbook, Preventive Medicine (1967), with Brian MacMahon (republished as Preventive and Community Medicine, 1981).

== Awards and legacy ==
Clark served as president of the New York Academy of Medicine (1983–84). The Annual Duncan W. Clark Lecture in Health Policy of the New York Academy of Medicine is named in his honour.

The Duncan Clark Award and the Duncan Clark Lectureship of the Association for Prevention Teaching and Research are also named for him. He was the first recipient of the Duncan Clark Award in 1974 and received the Duncan Clark Lectureship in 1992.

== Publications ==
- Clark DW, MacMahon B, eds. Preventive Medicine (J&A Churchill; Little, Brown; 1967) (ISBN 0316145556); reissued as Clark DW, MacMahon B, eds. Preventive and Community Medicine (Little, Brown; 1981) (ISBN 0316145963)
