= Hariton =

Hariton is a variant spelling of the Greek name Chariton. The Cyrillic spelling "Харитон" may be occasionally transliterated as Chariton, Khariton, and Hariton.

Notable people with this name include:

== Given name ==
- Hariton Pushwagner
- Heimann Hariton Tiktin
- Hariton Pașovschi
- Hariton-Tzannis Alivizatos, microbiologist, a proponent of a putative Greek cancer cure

== Surname ==
- Lorraine Hariton, CEO and President of Catalyst (nonprofit organization)
- Traian Hariton, a pseudonym of Traian Herseni (1907–1980), Romanian social scientist, journalist, and political figure

== See also ==
- Hariton Peak
- Haritina/Kharitina, feminine variant
