= Spiros Evangelatos =

Greek theater director and academic

- Σπύρος Ευαγγελάτος
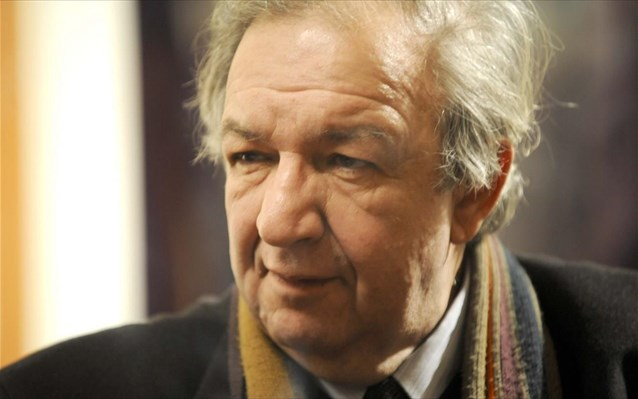
- Ο Σπύρος Ευαγγελάτος
- Born: 20 October 1940; Athens
- Died: 24 January 2017 (aged 76)
- Alma mater: National Theatre of Greece Drama School; National and Kapodistrian University of Athens
- Occupation: University teacher, theatre director
- Position held: President of the Academy of Athens (2013–)

Spiros Evangelatos (Greek: Σπύρος Ευαγγελάτος; October 20, 1940 – January 24, 2017) was a Greek theater director, academic, and member of the Academy of Athens.

== Biography ==
Born in Athens, Evangelatos was the son of composer and chief musician of the Greek National Opera, Antiochos Evangelatos, and harpist Xenia Bourexaki. Influenced by his family's artistic background, he pursued a career in theater. He initially studied at the School of Philosophy, University of Athens, and then at the National Theatre of Greece Drama School, graduating in 1961. Between 1966 and 1970, he furthered his studies in theater and theater studies on a scholarship at the University of Vienna.

Evangelatos founded the "Neoelliniki Skini" in 1962 and collaborated with the National Theatre of Greece from 1971 to 1977, directing performances in the Theatre of Epidaurus and other locations. He served as the general director of the National Theatre of Northern Greece (1977-1980) and the director of the Greek National Opera (1984-1987).

In 1975, he established "Amphi-Theatro," organizing performances worldwide. In February 2011, he announced the suspension of "Amphi-Theatro" due to financial difficulties.

He was honored with the "Karolos Koun" award in 1988, the award of the Society of Greek Playwrights in 1994, and the Directing Award of the same society in 1996. He was also decorated with the Order of the Phoenix. In 2005, he was elected a full member of the Academy of Athens.

On January 12, 2012, he was appointed vice-president of the Academy of Athens and became its president in 2013.
