= Charitina =

Charitina is the feminine form of the Greek name Chariton. It may refer to:

- Saint Charitina of Amisus (died in 304)
- Saint Charitina of Lithuania (died in 1281)

== See also ==
- Haritina (disambiguation), another variant
