= Dimitrios Trichopoulos =

American-Greek researcher (1938–2014)

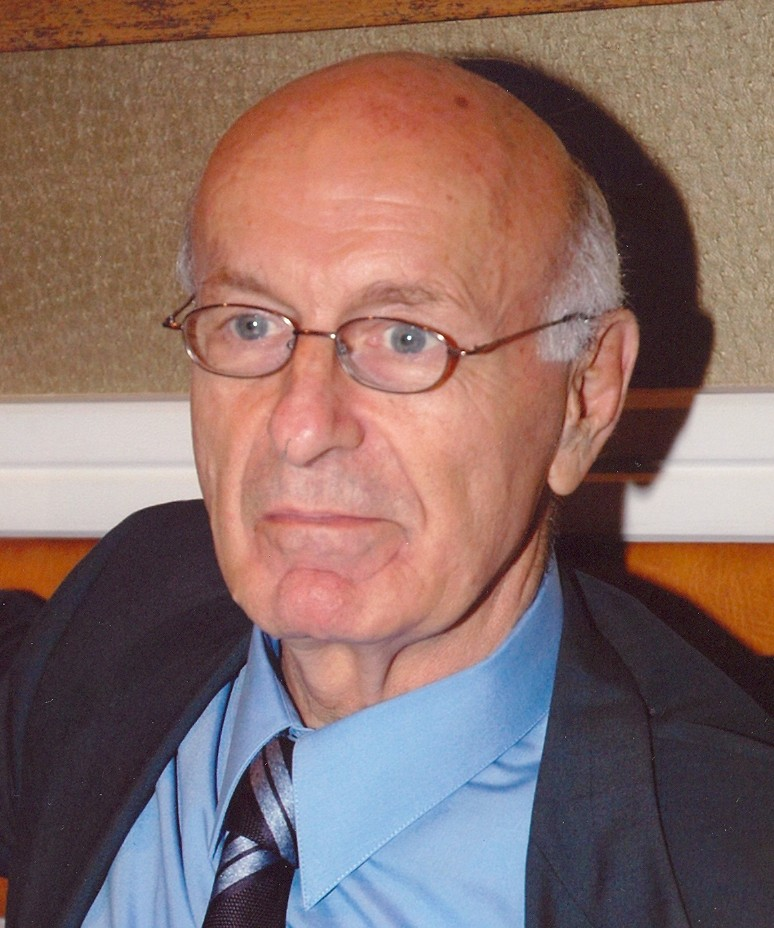
- Born: December 9, 1938; Volos, Greece
- Died: December 1, 2014 (aged 75); Athens, Greece
- Known for: —Mediterranean Diet expert —multi-factorial etiology of hepatocellular cancer, with emphasis on the interactive effects of hepatitis B and C viruses, tobacco smoking, and ethanol intake —Several oncology firsts: First, with 1990 paper in The Lancet, to propose that in utero exposures play a major role in breast cancer causation.; First in 1981, along with an independent paper published a few days later, to report that secondhand smoke increases the risk of lung cancer.; Dimitrios Trichopoulos studied 51 nonsmoking women hospitalized with lung cancer in Greece, and compared them with age-matched women hospitalized for other problems. The researchers determined that the cancer patients were significantly more likely to have been exposed to their husband’s cigarettes. Follow-up studies went on to confirm the risks of smoke inhalation by children in smoking households or in nonsmokers who live nearby.
- Awards: Honorary Doctor of Medicine, Uppsala University, Uppsala, Sweden (1994); Smoke-Free America Award (1996).; Commander of Honor of the Greek Republic (1996).; Regular Member, Academy of Athens (1997). Listing by the editor of The Lancet of a paper by DT (No 370) among the 23 papers deserving to form a Canon for Reading Medicine from antiquity to now (1997).; Distinguished Physician, Hellenic Medical Society of New York (1999).; Brinker International Award for Breast Cancer Research from Susan G. Komen for the Cure (2000).Brinker International Award for Breast Cancer Research (2000).; Member, Supreme Academy of Arts and Sciences, Athens, Greece
- Scientific career
- Fields: Oncology, cancer prevention
- Institutions: University of Athens Medical School, 1963-2014 Academy of Athens (1997-2014); Karolinska Institute, Stockholm (1998-2014) Harvard School of Public Health, 1969-2014
- Doctoral advisor: Brian MacMahon

Dimitrios Trichopoulos (Greek: Δημήτριος Τριχόπουλος; December 9, 1938 – December 1, 2014) was a Mediterranean Diet expert and tobacco harms researcher. He was Vincent L. Gregory Professor of Cancer Prevention and Professor of Epidemiology, and a past chair of the Department of Epidemiology, in the Harvard School of Public Health in Boston.

Trichopoulos conducted research and taught in the field of cancer epidemiology and prevention. He published more than 1,000 scientific papers, from seminal research linking secondhand smoke (SHS) from cigarettes with increased susceptibility to risk for lung cancer, and hepatitis B virus and tobacco smoking with increased risk of primary liver cancer (hepatocellular carcinoma), to findings documenting that surgically induced and early natural menopause reduced breast cancer risk. Beyond oncology, his paper linking psychological stress after an earthquake in Athens to increased risk of cardiac death was included in a 1997 list in The Lancet of 27 papers deserving to form a core canon of medical literature that every health professional should read.

His oncology epidemiology and prevention research career included significant "firsts": He was first, with a 1990 paper in The Lancet, to propose that in utero exposures play a major role in breast cancer causation. He also was first in 1981, along with an independent paper published a few days later, to report that secondhand smoke increases the risk of lung cancer. Dimitrios Trichopoulos studied 51 nonsmoking women in Greece who had been hospitalized with lung cancer, then he compared them with age-matched women who had been hospitalized (also in Greece) for other problems. Though seemingly self-evident, researchers were able to determine statistically that these cancer patients were significantly more likely to have been exposed to their husband's cigarettes. Follow-up studies then began to confirm the risks of smoke inhalation by children in smoking households or in nonsmokers who live nearby smoking, in adjacent apartment units.

A native of Greece, Dimitrios studied at the University of Athens Medical School, where he earned an M.D. in 1963 and a Ph.D. in 1971. In 1968, he earned a S.M. in Boston at the Harvard School of Public Health and held several teaching appointments there over the next two decades (lecturer, 1969–1970; visiting professor, 1981–1985; adjunct, 1988–1989).

Harvard appointed him a full professor in the Department of Epidemiology in 1989, which department he began to chair that same year succeeding Brian MacMahon, and serving in that role until 1996. Initiatives under his leadership included a series of collaborations with investigators now at the Karolinska Institute in Stockholm, Sweden. In 1993, he was named Vincent L. Gregory Professor of Cancer Prevention, and also began a four-year appointment as director of the Harvard Center for Cancer Prevention.

Trichopoulos also was a Member of the Athens Academy and president of the Hellenic Health Foundation in Greece. He held teaching appointments at the University of Athens Medical School and the Karolinska Institute in Sweden.

His awards and distinctions include honorary doctorates, the Brinker International Award for Breast Cancer Clinical Research, Harvard School of Public Health's Julius Richmond Award (2004) and Alumni Award of Merit (2009), and the Medal of Honor of the International Agency for Research on Cancer, World Health Organization.

He is survived by his wife Antonia Trichopoulou, with whom he co-published.

== Education ==
- MD, University of Athens Medical School (1963), Diploma
- Certificate, University of Athens Medical School, Internal Medicine Dept. of Clinical Therapeutics (1965)
- Certificate, Medical Statistics and Epidemiology, London School of Hygiene & Tropical Medicine (1965)
- MD, Doctorate Medical Sciences, University of Athens Medical School (1965)
- SM Harvard School of Public Health, Hygiene Epidemiology and Biostatistics (1968)
- State Certificate in Microbiology, University of Athens Medical School, 1970
- PhD, University of Athens Medical School (1971), Professorial Hygiene and Epidemiology, Thesis (PhD) (1971)
- Certificate, 1975 University of Oxford, Department of Health Services Research the Regius Professor of Medicine

== Career ==
Dimitrios Trichopoulos was born in Volos, Greece, about 326 kilometres (203 miles) north of Athens. He studied medicine at the University of Athens Medical School. He further studied Pathology, Microbiology, Public Health, and Epidemiology at universities of Athens, London, Oxford, and Harvard.

Trichopoulos had also studied the multi-factorial etiology of hepatocellular carcinoma (liver cancer), with emphasis on the interactive effects of hepatitis B and hepatitis C viruses, tobacco smoking, and ethanol intake.

He was chief professor of epidemiology at Harvard University from 1989 to 1996, professor of the prevention of cancer and head of the Center of Cancer Prevention at Harvard University from 1993 to 1997, professor and head of department at the Department of Hygiene and Epidemiology of the University of Athens Medical School from 1972 through 2014, professor of medical epidemiology at the Karolinska Institute in Stockholm from 1998 through 2014, and member of the Athens Academy from 1997 through 2014.

== Mediterranean diet ==
Trichopoulos co-chaired for Oldways (Boston) in 1993 their first International Conference on the Diets of the Mediterranean, the Conference where the Mediterranean Diet Pyramid was introduced. His wife, Antonia Trichopoulou, is known as the "mother of the Mediterranean Diet" an honor shared with Greek or Mediterranean cuisine.

== Selected publications ==
=== Books ===
- Olsen, J., Trichopoulos, D. (Eds), Saracci, R. (Revision). Teaching Epidemiology: A Guide for Teachers of Epidemiology in Public Health and Clinical Medicine. 2001.
- MacMahon B, Trichopoulos. Epidemiology: Principles and Methods, Second Edition. Boston: Little Brown, 1996. pp. xii+348.
- Adami HO, Hunter D, Trichopoulos D, eds. Textbook of Cancer Epidemiology – 2nd Ed. Oxford University Press, New York, 2008. pp. xxxiii+748.
- Olsen J, Saracci R, Trichopoulos D, eds. Teaching Epidemiology: a guide for teachers in epidemiology, public health and clinical medicine – 3 ed. Oxford University Press, Oxford, UK, 2010. pp 512.
