= Yiannis Parmakelis =

Greek sculptor

Yiannis Parmakelis (Greek: Γιάννης Παρμακέλης; born 27 June 1932 Heraklion) is a Greek sculptor best known for his metal statues and medals.

== Biography ==
Parmakelis completed his basic education in Heraklion, Crete and then studied at the Athens School of Fine Arts with a state scholarship. His teachers in Athens included the painter Yiannis Moralis and the sculptor Yiannis Pappas (el). During 1961–1964, after winning a state scholarship foundation grant, he continued his studies at the Ecole nationale superieure des Beaux-Arts in Paris, where he studied with Ossip Zadkine and Robert Couturier.

Upon returning to Greece, he taught drawing and sculpture at the Doxiadis Technology Institute the Vakalo School of Art and Design and the Democritus University of Thrace. Parmakelis has represented Greece at many international exhibitions and Biennales. His work is anthropocentric, characterized by elliptical figures that combine solid structure and expressive mobility. Examples are exhibited at museums, public spaces, private institutions and organizations in Greece, Europe and the Americas. In 2011, he was elected a member of the Academy of Athens in the section of Letters and Fine Arts.
