= Brian MacMahon =

American epidemiologist and cancer researcher (1923–2007)

- Born: 23 August 1923; Sheffield, England
- Died: 5 December 2007 (aged 84); Boston, Massachusetts, U.S.
- Education: University of Birmingham, UK
- Known for: Breast cancer epidemiology
- Awards: Charles S. Mott Prize (1992)
- Scientific career
- Fields: Epidemiology
- Workplaces: Harvard School of Public Health, U.S.

Brian MacMahon (23 August 1923 – 5 December 2007) was a British-born American epidemiologist who chaired the Department of Epidemiology of the Harvard School of Public Health from 1958 until 1988. Best known for his work on the epidemiology of breast cancer, he also pioneered research on associations between passive smoking and lung cancer, and between diet and risk of cancer.

== Personal life ==
MacMahon was born in Sheffield, where his father, Desmond MacMahon, was a professional violinist. In 1948, he married Heidi Marie Graber from Switzerland (died 2001); the couple had two sons and two daughters. MacMahon also had a brother, Paddy, who was a doctor in the British Army.

MacMahon emigrated to the United States in the late 1950s, and became a U.S. citizen in 1962. He died at Boston, Massachusetts in 2007, aged 84, following a stroke.

== Education and early career ==
MacMahon studied medicine at the University of Birmingham, gaining the diplomas of the Royal College of Physicians and Royal College of Surgeons in 1946, and the MB BChir in 1948. After working as a locum doctor in impoverished areas of Birmingham, MacMahon served as a ship's doctor in the British Merchant Navy from 1946 to 1948. He later said that these experiences left him "somewhat dispirited about a future in clinical medicine".

Enrolment in a course in public health at the University of Birmingham brought him into contact with epidemiologists Thomas McKeown, Ronald Lowe and Reginald Record, who became his supervisors in a PhD in "social medicine" (as epidemiology was then known) studying infantile pyloric stenosis. After gaining his PhD in 1952, he travelled to the US to obtain a Master's in epidemiology at the Harvard School of Public Health (1953). In 1955, he gained the MD degree at the University of Birmingham.

== Career in epidemiology ==
MacMahon's early academic positions were at the University of Birmingham, UK, and at the Department of Environmental Medicine and Community Health at the State University of New York in Brooklyn, USA, where he worked with Duncan W. Clark, focusing on the epidemiology of leukemia and breast cancer.

In 1958, he was appointed head of the Harvard School of Public Health, USA, a position he held until his retirement in 1988. In 1967, he co-founded the Society for Epidemiologic Research, a learned society for epidemiologists. In 1976, he was appointed the Henry Pickering Walcott Professor of Epidemiology at the school, and he also served as the Associate Dean (1977–78). From 1974, he held a professorship in public health at the University of Hawaii at Manoa. MacMahon built the Harvard School of Public Health into a world-class research institution; he particularly prided himself, however, on nurturing students, many of whom went on to become leaders in the field of epidemiology. Well-known former students include Dimitrios Trichopoulos and Walter Willett.

MacMahon co-authored the textbook Epidemiologic Methods (1960), later reissued as Epidemiology: Principles and Methods, with Thomas Pugh. Described by Willett as "the first modern epidemiology textbook", it became a standard text in the subject. He co-edited Preventive Medicine (1967), later republished as Preventive and Community Medicine, with Duncan W. Clark.

== Research ==
=== Breast cancer ===
MacMahon was unusual in focusing on the epidemiology of chronic diseases, in particular cancer, at a time when most epidemiologists concentrated on infectious diseases. His best-known research relates to breast cancer. An international study, published in 1970, on which MacMahon was the lead author showed for the first time that the age at which a woman first gives birth significantly affects her risk of later developing breast cancer; giving birth at a young age was found to be protective. Subsequent work by MacMahon's group showed that every year a woman delays giving birth after the age of eighteen increases her risk of developing breast cancer by 3.5%. The 1970 study stimulated later research into hormonal causes of breast cancer.

MacMahon's group also studied other factors associated with breast cancer risk, including age at menarche and menopause, lactation, alcohol consumption and diet.

=== Other cancers ===
With Dimitrios Trichopoulos, MacMahon pioneered research into the association of passive smoking with lung cancer. Their study showed that non-smoking women whose husbands smoked heavily (more than a pack per day) had a greater than threefold increased risk of developing lung cancer.

He was also one of the first to study the effect of diet on cancer; this work was continued by his student Walter Willett. This research was not without controversy: a case-control study which unexpectedly linked coffee drinking with increased risk of pancreatic cancer provoked a storm of protest from coffee drinkers and industry groups, with coverage in the New York Times, Time magazine and Newsweek. Academic criticism focused on the study's choice of controls. Subsequent studies, including one by MacMahon's group, failed to confirm the association. He studied Hodgkin's lymphoma, providing evidence that the disease might be caused by more than one agent.

=== Other diseases ===
MacMahon worked extensively on pyloric stenosis of infants. His work focused attention on the effect of environmental factors on this disease. Despite developing Dupuytren's contracture in his hands, which hindered computer use, MacMahon remained active in research long after his official retirement, for example, contributing a final review on pyloric stenosis in 2006.

== Awards ==
MacMahon was awarded the National Divisional Distinguished Service Award of the American Cancer Society (1971), the John Snow Award of the American Public Health Association (1980), the Donald Reid Medal of the London School of Hygiene and Tropical Medicine (1987), and the Charles S. Mott Prize of the General Motors Cancer Research Foundation for his work on the epidemiology of cancer (1992). He became a member of the Institute of Medicine in 1973, and later received honorary doctorates from the University of Birmingham, University of Athens and the State University of New York.

== Key publications ==
=== Books ===
- MacMahon B, Pugh TF. Epidemiologic Methods (Little, Brown; 1960); reissued as Epidemiology: Principles and Methods (Little, Brown; 1970) (ISBN 0316542598)

=== Research papers ===
- McKeown T, MacMahon B. (1955) Infantile pyloric stenosis in parent and child. Arch Dis Child 30: 497–500 (PMID 13275979)
- MacMahon B, Cole P, Lin TM et al.. (1970) Age at first birth and breast cancer risk. Bull World Health Organ 43: 209–221 (PMID 5312521)
- Trichopoulos D, Kalandidi A, Sparros L, MacMahon B. (1981) Lung cancer and passive smoking. Int J Cancer 27: 1–4 (PMID 7251227)
- MacMahon B, Yen S, Trichopoulos D et al.. (1981) Coffee and cancer of the pancreas. N Engl J Med 304: 630–633 (PMID 7453739)
- Trichopoulos D, Hsieh CC, MacMahon B et al.. (1983) Age at any birth and breast cancer risk. Int J Cancer 31: 701–704 (PMID 6862681)
- Newcomb PA, Storer BE, Longnecker MP et al.. (1994) Lactation and a reduced risk of premenopausal breast cancer. N Engl J Med 330: 81–87 (PMID 8259187) (full text)
