= Faculty of Geology and Geoenvironment (University of Athens) =

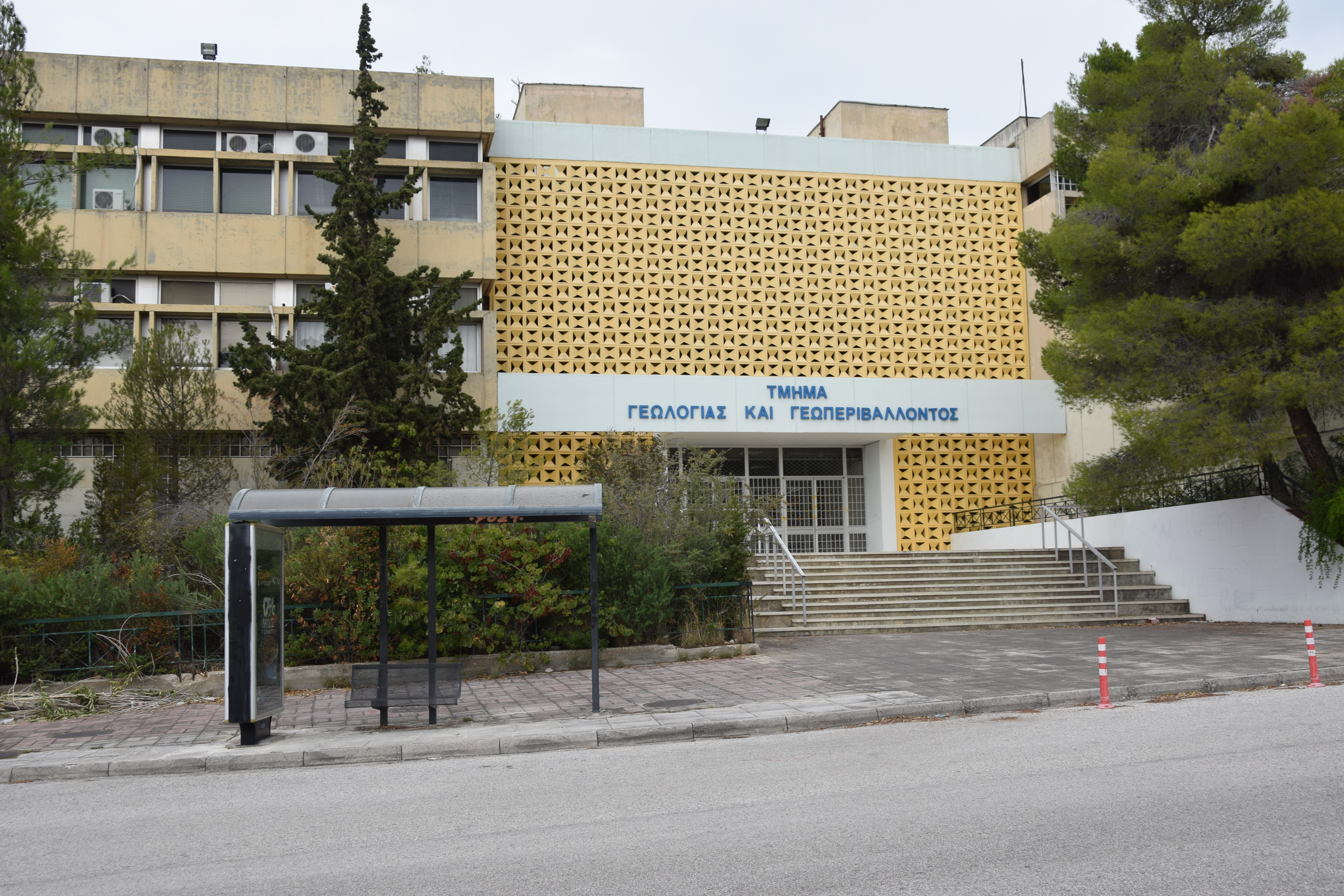

The Faculty of Geology is part of the School of Sciences in National and Kapodistrian University of Athens.

== Early history ==
The history of geological sciences at Athens University until 1982 and the institutional change of the law 1268, is linked to the history of the established Chairs, and the Professors who taught there.

The Laboratory and the Museum of Mineralogy and Petrology were founded in 1896, and Professor Konstantinos M. Mitsopoulos taught mineralogy and held this professorshiop until 1910. Konstantinos Ktenas was elected as professor, to succeed Mitsopoulos, and held this role until his death in 1935. In 1936, G. Georgalas was the next to occupy the Chair until 1946. After him, An. Georgiadis (1946–1965) and Gr. Marakis (1973–1994) were elected as professors.

The Chair of Geology and Palaeontology as well as the Laboratory and Museum of Geology and Palaeontology were founded by professor Th. Skoufos after his appointment in 1906. He enriched the Laboratory and the Museum with fossils as training material for students and as material for the collection of the museum exhibition, through many excavations realized in various places around Greece.

After Skoufos (1906–1936), Professor M. Mitsopoulos became head of the laboratory and the museum. He was later succeeded by G. Marinos (1969–1974), who moved from the Aristotle University of Thessaloniki, followed by Professor N. Symeonidis, from 1975 to 1998.

The Chair of Physical Geography and the corresponding laboratory was founded in 1931 and was initially located at the Athens Observatory. Professor I. Trikkalinos was head of the Laboratory until 1958. Later on P. Psarianos was elected as Professor (1959–1974) and then Ath. Papapetrou-Zamani, initially as Associate professor and then as Professor (1975–1997).

In the year 1931 the Chair of Seismology and the corresponding laboratory was founded with Professor N. Kritikos (1930–1947) as head of the Laboratory, which was initially located at the Athens Observatory. Later, A. Galanopoulos (1949–1978) and I. Drakopoulos (1979–1999) were elected to this role.

The Chair of Ore Geology and the corresponding laboratory were founded in 1961, and held by Professor G. Paraskevopoulos until his death in 1983.

== Departments ==
According to the law 1268/82 the School of Sciences is founded, which also includes the Faculty of Geology. The previously mentioned Chairs were annulled and the following Departments were created and still exist to this day:

- Department of Mineralogy and Petrology
- Department of Historical Geology and Palaeontology
- Department of Geography and Climatology
- Department of Geophysics and Geothermics
- Department of Economical Geology and Geochemistry
- Department of Dynamic, Tectonic and Applied Geology

== Laboratories ==
- Laboratory of Mineralogy and Petrology
- Laboratory of Historical Geology and Palaeontology
- Laboratory of Physical Geography
- Laboratory of Climatology
- Laboratory of Seismology
- Laboratory of Economical Geology and Geochemistry
- Laboratory of Tectonics and Geological mapping
- Laboratory of Remote Sensing
- Laboratory of Geophysics
- Laboratory of Prevention and Management of Natural Disasters

== Professors Emeriti ==
- Athina Papapetrou Zamani Professor of Physical Geography
- Nikolaos Simeonidis Professor of Geology and Palaeontology
- Ioannis Zampakas Professor of Climatology
- Sotirios Leontaris Professor of Physical Geography
- Ilias Mariolakos Professor of Geology and Palaeontology
- Stylianos Skounakis Professor of Economic Geology
- Nikolaos Delimpasis Professor of Seismology
- Konstantinos Sideris Professor of Mineralogy and Petrology

== Postgraduate courses ==
Within the framework of the postgraduate studies program of the Faculty of Geology the following two year courses are offered:

- Geochemical Environmental Pollution
- Stratigraphy - Palaeontology
- Mineral Sciences
- Geography and Environment
- Dynamic Tectonic and Applied Geology
- Geophysics - Seismology
- Prevention and Management of Natural Disasters

as well as the inter-faculty Postgraduate Study Program in Oceanography in which the following faculties are involved: Geology, Biology, Physics, Chemistry.

== Museums ==
The Faculty of Geology manages two museums

- Paleontology and Geology Museum
- Mineralogy and Petrology Museum
