= Georgios Remoundos =

Greek mathematician (1878–1928)

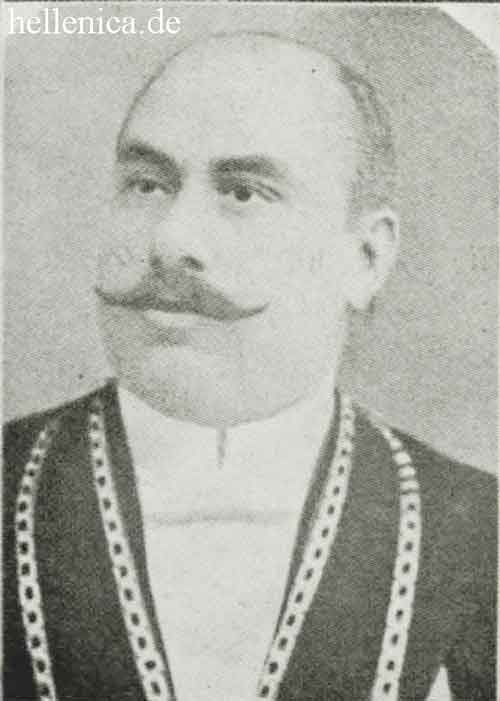
Georgios Remoundos

Georgios Remoundos (Γεώργιος Ρεμούνδος, 1878 in Athens – 27 April 1928) was a Greek mathematician and a founding member of the Academy of Athens in 1926.

After graduating from the Varvakeio, he studied at the University of Athens and was given a government scholarship to study in France. He studied at the École Normale Supérieure and then at the University of Paris, where he received in 1905 his Ph.D. (Thèse de doctorat) with thesis Sur les zéros d'une classe de fonctions transcendantes. A post-doctoral student of Émile Picard, Remoundos published in French under the name "Georges J. Rémoundos". He was a professor of mathematics at the University of Athens. He was a co-editor and co-founder, along with P. Zervos, N. Sakellarios, and K. Lambiris, of the journal Bulletin de la Société Mathématique de Gréce, first published in May 1919 written about one-third in French and two-thirds in Greek. Remoundos was three times an invited speaker at the International Congress of Mathematicians: in 1908 at Rome, in 1912 at Cambridge (England), and in 1920 at Strasbourg.

== Selected publications ==
- "Extension aux fonctions algébroïdes multiformes du théorème de M. Picard et de ses généralisations". Mémorial des Sciences Mathématiques. 1927.
- Rémoundos, Georges (1914). "Sur les familles de fonctions multiformes admettant des valeurs exceptionnelles dans un domaine". Acta Mathematica. 37: 241–300. doi:10.1007/bf02401835.
- Rémoundos, M. Georges (1908). "Sur quelques configurations formées par un ensemble de points du plan". Rendiconti del Circolo Matematico di Palermo (1884–1940). 25: 50–52. doi:10.1007/bf03029115. S2CID 121478896.
- Rémoundos, Georges (1907). "Sur les points critiques transcendants". Annales de la Faculté des Sciences de Toulouse. 9: 177–182. doi:10.5802/afst.243.
- Rémoundos, M. Georges (1913). "Le théorème de M. Picard et les fonctions algébroïdes". Rendiconti del Circolo Matematico di Palermo (1884–1940). 35: 217–224. doi:10.1007/bf03015601. S2CID 120343664.
- Rémoundos, M. Georges (1907). "Sur les intégrales réelles des équations différentielles et les forces centrales". Rendiconti del Circolo Matematico di Palermo (1884-1940). 24: 254–257. doi:10.1007/bf03015064. S2CID 115976420.
- Rémoundos, Georges-J. (1913). "Sur les fonctions entières et algébroïdes; généralisation du théorème de M. Picard dans la direction de M. Landau". Annales Scientifiques de l'École Normale Supérieure. 30: 377–393. doi:10.24033/asens.662.
- Rémoundos, Georges (1908). "Sur quelques transformations des équations différentielles du premier ordre". Journal für die Reine und Angewandte Mathematik. 1908 (134): 308–312. doi:10.1515/crll.1908.134.308. S2CID 124831305.
- "Sur les fonctions ayant un nombre fini de branches". Journal de Mathématiques Pures et Appliquées: 87–108. 1906.
- "Sur la croissance des fonctions multiformes". Journal de Mathématiques Pures et Appliquées: 267–298. 1907.
