= Georgios Sotiriou =

Greek archaeologist and academic (1880–1965)

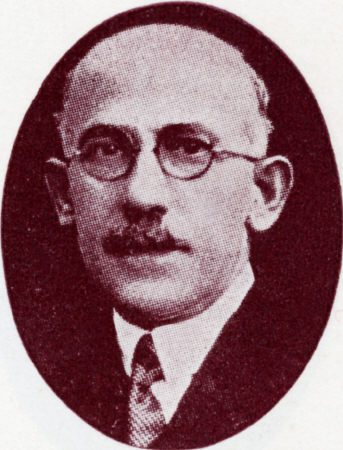
- Born: 1880; Spetses
- Died: 24 January 1965 (aged 84–85); Athens
- Occupations: Archaeologist, Byzantinist, museologist, university teacher

Georgios Sotiriou or Soteriou (Greek: Γεώργιος Σωτηρίου) he was a Byzantinist, archaeologist, curator and later head of the Byzantine and Christian Museum in Athens.

== Career ==
Soteriou was born in Athens in 1880, he studied in Athens and Europe. In 1915 he was appointed Ephor-General of Antiquities and in 1923 he became the director of the Byzantine and Christian Museum. He became the president of the Academy of Athens for the year 1941.

Soteriou contributed greatly to the organisation of the Greek Archaeological Service and Byzantine archaeology in Greece. Among his excavations where, the Byzantine church at Ilisos in Athens, at Nea Anchialos; he also studied the church of Agios Demetrios in order to conserve the monument after the Great Thessaloniki Fire of 1917. The conservation of the church was an arduous project that lasted into the 1950's, due to financial challenges, war and political volatility. Furthermore he studied with his wife, Maria, the icons from Saint Catherine's Monastery in Sinai.

He was invited by Kyrillos III of Cyprus to study the Byzantine monuments of Cyprus. Where he published Byzantine monuments, among them Saint George of the Greeks. Some of the drawings of his publications in Cyprus were done by the topographer Theophilus Amin Halil Mogabgab. He coined the term Franco-Byzantine to describe the church architecture of Medieval Cyprus.

== Publications ==
- Σωτηρίου, Γ.; Μάτλη, Λ. και Λεονταρίτη, Δ. (1902). Φοιτητικαί σελίδες του 1901: ήτοι πλήρης περιγραφή της κατά των μεταφράσεων του Ι. Ευαγγελίου εξεγέρσεως των φοιτητών και του λαού μετά των προκαλεσάντων αυτήν αιτίων. Εν Αθήναις: Εκ του Τυπογραφείου Αδελφών Κτενά.
- Σωτηρίου, Γ. (1915). Το Αγιον Όρος: Ιστορία και Τέχνη. Εν Αθήναις: Σιδέρης, Ι.
- Σωτηρίου, Γ. (1918). ‘Έκθεσις περί των εργασιών των εκτελεσθεισών εν τη ηρειπωμένη εκ της πυρκαϊάς Βασιλική του Αγ. Δημητρίου Θεσσαλονίκης κατά τα έτη 1917–1918’, Αρχαιολογικόν Δελτίον, 4, 1–47.
- Σωτηρίου, Γ. (1924). Η συλλογή της Χριστιανικής Αρχαιολογικής Εταιρείας και η συμβολή της προς καταρτισμόν του Βυζαντινού Μουσείου. Δελτίον της Χριστιανικής Αρχαιολογικής Εταιρείας, 1(2), Σελ. 74–87.
- Σωτηρίου, Γ. (1924). Η εν Σαλαμίνι μονή της Φανερωμένης. Επετηρίς Εταιρείας Βυζαντινών Σπουδών, Έτος Α’, 109–138.
- Σωτηρίου, Γ. (1926). Παρατηρήσεις εις νεωτέρας θεωρίας περι της Βυζαντινής ζωγραφικής κατά τους χρόνους των Παλαιολόγων. Πρακτικά της Ακαδημίας Αθηνών, 173–183.
- Κουρουνιώτη, Κ. και Σωτηρίου, Γ. Α. (επιμ.) (1927–1933). Ευρετήριον των μνημείων της Ελλάδος. Εν Αθήναις: Αρχαιολογικόν Τμήμα του Υπουργείου Παιδείας.
- Σωτηρίου, Γ. (1928). Η χριστιανική κατακόμβη της νήσου Μήλου. Πρακτικά της Ακαδημίας Αθηνών, 33–46.
- Σωτηρίου, Γ. (1929). Η βασιλική της Επιδαύρου. Πρακτικά της Ακαδημίας Αθηνών, 91–95.
- Σωτηρίου, Γ. (1929). Αραβικά λείψανα εν Αθήναις κατά τους Βυζαντινούς χρόνους. Πρακτικά της Ακαδημίας Αθηνών, 266–273.
- Σωτηρίου, Γ. (1931). Τα παλαιοχριστιανικά και βυζαντινά μνημεία της Κύπρου. Πρακτικά της Ακαδημίας Αθηνών, 477–490.
- Σωτηρίου, Γ. (1931). Οδηγός του Βυζαντινού Μουσείου Αθηνών. 2η έκδοση. Εν Αθήναις: Εστία.
- Σωτηρίου, Γ. (1933). Η εικών της παμμακάριστου. Πρακτικά της Ακαδημίας Αθηνών, 359–368.
- Σωτηρίου, Γ. Α. (1935). Παλαιοχριστιανικά και Βυζαντινά κιονόκρανα μετά φύλλων αμπέλου. Επετηρίς Εταιρείας Βυζαντινών Σπουδών, ΙΑ’, 449–457.
- Σωτηρίου, Γ. (1935). Τα Βυζαντινά Μνημεία της Κύπρου. Ακαδημία Αθηνών.
- Σωτηρίου, Γ. (1936). Ψηφιδωταί εικόνες της Κωνσταντινουπόλεως. Πρακτικά της Ακαδημίας Αθηνών, 70–81.
- Σωτηρίου, Γ. (1937). Κειμήλια του Οικουμενικού Πατριαρχείου: Πατριαρχικός ναός και Σκευοφυλάκιον. Εν Αθήναις: Εστία.
- Σωτηρίου, Γ. (1938). Περί των μεταβυζαντινών εικόνων. Δελτίον της Χριστιανικής Αρχαιολογικής Εταιρείας, 3, 81–84.
- Σωτηρίου, Γ. (1940). Ἀνασκαφαὶ ἐν Νέᾳ Ἀγχιάλῳ. Πρακτικὰ τῆς Ἀρχαιολογικῆς Ἐταιρίας. 18–22.
- Σωτηρίου, Γ. (1942). Χριστιανική και βυζαντινή αρχαιολογία: χριστιανικά κοιμητήρια, εκκλησιαστική αρχιτεκτονική. Εν Αθήναις.
- Σωτηρίου, Γ. (1944). Αι εικόνες της Παναγίας και αι επωνυμίαι των. Ορίζοντες: Ελληνικόν Ημερολόγιο, 3, 725–730.
- Σωτηρίου, Γ. (1945). Ο Βυζαντινός ναός του Αγίου Αχιλλείου της πρέσπας και αι Βουλγαρικαί περι της ιδρύσεως τούτου απόψεις. Πρακτικά της Ακαδημίας Αθηνών, 8–14.
- Σωτηρίου, Γ. (1948). Το εν Θεσσαλονίκη αρχικόν μαρτύριον του Αγίου Δημητρίου. Πρακτικά της Ακαδημίας Αθηνών, 453-453.
- Σωτηρίου, Γ. (1952). Η βασιλική του Αγίου Δημητρίου Θεσσαλονίκης. Εν Αθήναις: Αρχαιολογική Εταιρία Αθηνών.
- Σωτηρίου, Γ. (1955). Η Χριστιανική και Βυζαντινή Εικονογραφία. 5–13.
- Σωτηρίου, Γ. (1955). Οι εικονογραφικοί κύκλοι του βυζαντινού ναού.
- Σωτηρίου, Γ. (1958). Λεσβιακή Αγιολογία ή Λεσβιακόν Λειμωνάριον: Ιστορική έρευνα-βίοι-ακολουθίαι-μνημεία-εικόνες των είκοσι και τριών Αγίων της Λέσβου. Μυτιλήνη.
- Σωτηρίου, Γ. (1968). Η τοπική αγιολογία εις την Λέσβον. Μυτιλήνη.
- Σωτηρίου, Γ. & Σωτηρίου, M. (1958). Εἰκόνες τῆς Μονῆς Σινᾶ, 2 τόμοι. Αθήναι: Γαλλικὸ Ἰνστιτοῦτο Ἀθηνῶν.

== Publications about Soteriou ==
- Χριστιανική Αρχαιολογική Εταιρεία (ΧΑΕ). (1966). Βιβλιογραφία Γεωργίου Σωτηρίου. Δελτίον της Χριστιανικής Αρχαιολογικής Εταιρείας, 4.

== See also ==
- Anastasios Orlandos – Greek archaeologist and architect (1887–1979)
- Stefanos Sinos – Greek architect, academic, and writer
