= Haritina =

Haritina may refer to:

- 7101 Haritina, an asteroid
- Haritina Korotkevich (1882–1904), Russian soldier
- A transliteration variant of Charitina

== See also ==
- Hariotina, a genus of green algae in the family Scenedesmaceae
