= Michalis Tiverios =

Greek archaeologist

Michalis A. Tiverios
- Μιχάλης Τιβέριος
- Born: 1947 (age 78–79); Chora, Andros, Greece
- Known for: Research on ancient Attic black-figure pottery Excavations in Macedonia and the Aegean
- Awards: Honorary Doctorate, University of Bern (1999)

Academic background
- Education: Aristotle University of Thessaloniki; University of Bonn
- Thesis: (1976)
- Doctoral advisor: Manolis Andronikos
- Other advisor: N. Himmelmann

Academic work
- Institutions: Aristotle University of Thessaloniki

Michalis A. Tiverios (born 1947, Greek: Μιχάλης Τιβέριος) is a Greek archaeologist, Professor Emeritus of Classical Archaeology at the School of History and Archaeology of the Faculty of Philosophy of the Aristotle University of Thessaloniki, Greece and member of the Academy of Athens, Greece. He also supervises the Research Center for Antiquity of the Academy of Athens.

== Education and studies ==
Michalis Tiverios was born in 1947 in Chora, Andros (Cyclades, Greece), where he also received his primary and secondary education. After finishing his compulsory education, he studied at the Faculty of Philosophy of the Aristotle University of Thessaloniki and graduated in 1971. In 1976, he received his PhD degree under the supervision of Prof. Manolis Andronikos. In the years from 1977 to 1979, he continued his studies, as an Alexander von Humboldt Foundation fellow, at the Archaeological Institute of Bonn under the supervision of Prof. N. Himmelmann. His contribution to the research of the ancient Attic black-figure pottery is particularly important.

== Scientific and academic career ==
In 1975, he was appointed Assistant at the First Chair of Classical Archaeology of the Aristotle University of Thessaloniki. In 1981, he was appointed Reader at the School of History and Archaeology of the Aristotle University. He was elected Associate Professor in 1983 and Full Professor in 1987. During his tenure at the School of History and Archaeology of the Aristotle University of Thessaloniki, he was: Chairman of the School (1989–1993), Head of the Department of Archaeology and of the Cast Museum of the University (1984–1986) and Director of Postgraduate Studies of the Department (1996–1998).

Furthermore, in 1987, he worked at the Institute of Classical Archaeology of LMU Munich and at the German Archaeological Institute in Rome. He also worked at Marburg University in 1994 and at the J. Paul Getty Museum in Malibu, California in 1998. He is a member of many Scientific Committees, Organizations and Institutions, for example of the European Academy of Sciences and Arts (Academia Scientiarum et Artium Europaea, Class I: Humanities), the German Archaeological Institute of Berlin and the Archeological Institute of America. He has been a member of the Greek National Committee for UNESCO, the National Advisory Board on Research and the National Council for Research and Technology. He is or has been a member of the Board of Directors of various Foundations, e.g. the National Bank of Greece Cultural Foundation, the Institute for Balkan Studies and the Teloglion Fine Arts Foundation of the Aristotle University of Thessaloniki.

In November 2011, he was elected ordinary member of the Academy of Athens at the Section of Letters and Fine Arts (chair of Archaeology [Ceramic]).

== Archaeological research ==
Alongside his teaching and academic career he has participated in important excavations at various archaeological sites at Vergina, Philippi, Thessaloniki, Cyprus and Palaiopoli, Andros. He has been the Director of the University excavations at two ancient settlements that are located near Sindos (1990–2002) and at Karabournaki (1994–2013) in Thessaloniki, Greece.

== Awards and honours ==
He has been honoured by various Institutions and Scientific Foundations. For example, he was conferred an Honorary Degree of Doctor by the University of Bern in 1999. In 2007, the International Conference "Athenian Potters and Painters II", held in Athens, was dedicated to him and so was the volume presenting the proceedings of this conference.

== Publications ==
His published work includes original studies and monographs, numerous articles in Greek and International Scientific Journals on pottery, iconography, excavations, history, sculpture, epigraphy and religion, as well as book presentations and reviews, and popularizing articles on pottery and Ancient Greece. He has supervised many archaeological editions and translations of scientific archaeological books, for example “Red Figure Vases of South Italy and Sicily” by A. D. Trendall and “The Archaeology of Athens and Attica” by J. Camp. He also participates in the Editorial or Advisory Boards of scientific archaeological journals.

== Edition of publications ==
- Color in Ancient Greece. The Role of Color in Ancient Greek Art and Architecture 700-31 BC, Thessaloniki 2002. Edited by M. A. Tiverios - D. S. Tsiafaki.
- ΑRCHAIC POTTERY OF THE NORTHERN AEGEANAND ITS PERIPHERY (700-480 BC), Proceedings of the Archaeological MeetingThessaloniki, 19–22 May 2011, Thessaloniki 2012. Edited by M. Tiverios - V. Misailidou-Despotidou - E. Manakidou - A. Arvanitaki
- Threpteria, Studies on Ancient Macedonia, Thessaloniki 2012. Edited by M. Tiverios - P. Nigdelis - P. Adam-Veleni.

== Exhibitions and conferences ==
He has participated in the scientific and/or organizing committees of several archaeological exhibitions and conferences.

- International Meeting of Lexicon Iconographicum Mythologiae Classicae (LIMC) held at the Aristotle University of Thessaloniki, in May 1993.
- International Conference on the Role of Color in Ancient Greek Art and Architecture held at Thessaloniki, April 12–16 of 2000, in collaboration with J. Paul Getty Museum (California)
- From 2008 to 2015, he was a member of the organizing committee of the annual international conference: “Το Αρχαιολογικό Έργο στη Μακεδονία και στη Θράκη” (The archaeological work in Macedonia and Thrace”)
