= Alexei Kharitonenkov =

Russian biochemist

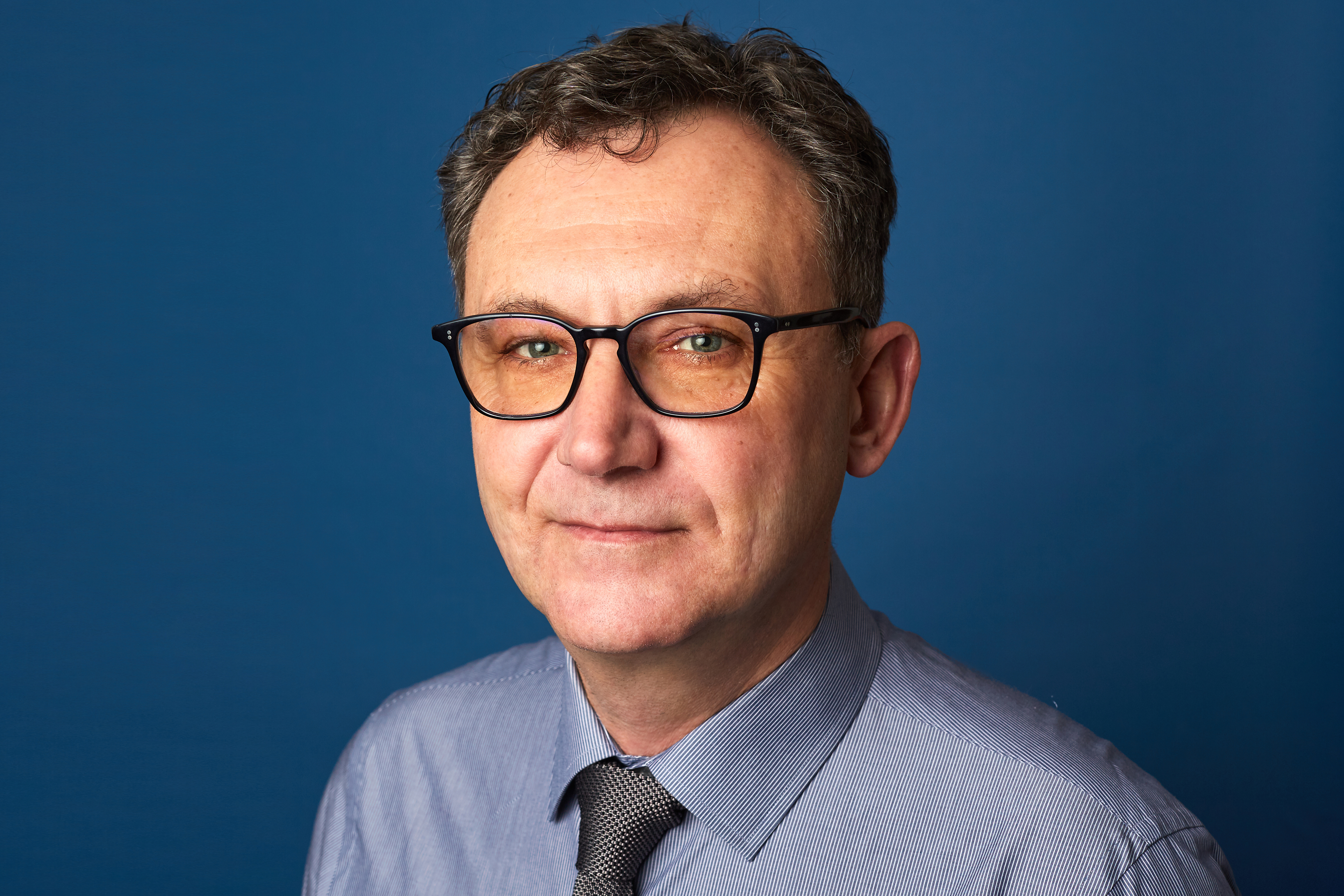

Alexei Kharitonenkov (Russian: Алексей Игоревич Харитоненков) is a Russian-American researcher best known for his discoveries of endocrine functions of Fibroblast Growth Factor 21 (FGF21) and its prospects in developing novel therapies for metabolic diseases. He is also known for his landmark identification of the signal-regulatory family of proteins (SIRPs), and their corresponding protein-tyrosine phosphatases, which helped unveil the molecular machinery of immune self-recognition ("do-not-eat me" signal) and their potential for the development of drugs to fight cancer.

== Education ==
In 1985, Kharitonenkov graduated with an MS in Physics from Moscow State University (MSU), Moscow, Russia. In 1990, he received a Ph.D. degree in biochemistry from MSU, followed by post-doctoral fellowship trainings in molecular biology and signal transduction at the Max Planck Institute of Biochemistry (1992-1994).

== Career ==
From 1986 to 1992, Kharitonenkov was a research fellow at Biochemistry Department, Biology Faculty, Moscow State University, Moscow, Russia. Between 1994 and 1998 he was a staff scientist at the Molecular Biology department of the Max Planck Institute of Biochemistry. Next, he joined Eli Lilly and Company and worked there until 2014. He then moved to Calibrium, LLC. Upon acquisition of this company, he pursued his research at Novo Nordisk USA in 2016. More recently, Kharitonenkov has been an executive and/or founder of startups within the biopharmaceutical field, where he has also been an inventor.

He has authored more than 100 peer-reviewed papers, most of them studying aspects of signal transduction, molecular biology, pharmacology, drug discovery and development in the areas of cancer and metabolic diseases. He is also a contributing author to chapters of review books on endocrine FGFs and metabolism and FGF21 as a therapeutic agent. In 1997 and 2005, he contributed to priming articles describing the structures and functions of SIRPs and FGF21. He is named as an inventor on multiple patents.

The discovery of FGF21's metabolic action by Kharitonenkov el. al. in 2005, and 2012, represents an important breakthrough in the search for pharmacological alternatives to current treatments of diabetes and other metabolic diseases, as acknowledged in subject reviews and reference books. Kharitonenkov's and others' research on FGF21 mostly advocates for an adipocentric mode of action; however, recent reports are suggestive of the brain being a primary target where this hormone would first produce its effects. This poses some uncertainty on peripheral vs. centrally-driven mechanism of acton of this novel metabolic regulator.
