= Antiochos Evangelatos =

Greek composer and conductor

Antiochos Evangelatos (sometimes spelled Evanghelatos) (Greek: Αντίοχος Ευαγγελάτος; 1903 – 1981) was a Greek classical composer and conductor.

== Biography ==
He was born in Lixouri, Cefalonia on 25 December 1903. He studied composition and conducting in Leipzig, Basel and Vienna with Max Ludwig, Kofler and Felix Weingartner. From 1933 on he taught composition and counterpoint at the Hellenic Conservatory of Athens. In 1957 he was elected president of the Union of Greek Composers in 1957. Evangelatos' compositions are based thematically on folk music, their style is Romantic and their elaboration contrapuntal.

He died in 1981 in Athens.

== Works ==
- Sinfonietta (1927)
- Symphony no.1 (1930)
- Larghetto and Scherzo (1932)
- Suite (1934)
- Byzantine Melody (1936)
- Overture to a drama (1937)
- Variations and Fugue on a Greek Folksong (1949)
- The Death and the Maiden (1941)
- 5 Songs (A. Sikelianos) (1941-3)
- String Quartet (1930)
- String Sextet (1932)
- Coasts and Mountains of Attica

== Sources ==
- The New Grove Dictionary of Music and Musicians
