= Józef Charyton =

Józef Charyton (November 8, 1909 in Krupice, Congress Poland, Russian Empire – January 8, 1975 in Białystok, Poland) was a Polish artist.

In 1938 he was the only artist to prepare the crypt for the reburial of the last king of Poland, Stanisław August Poniatowski after his remains were transferred from Leningrad, Soviet Union. After that he became fascinated with the history of the life and death and posthumous turmoils of king Stanisław August. It was described in the essay of Marian Brandys, The Guardian of the King's Tomb (1984), based on the long correspondence of Brandys with Charyton.

During World War II he witnessed extermination of Jews and Gypsies. These memories became the base of a large collection of portraits and everyday life of the perished.
