= Haritina Korotkevich =

Russian soldier (1882–1904)

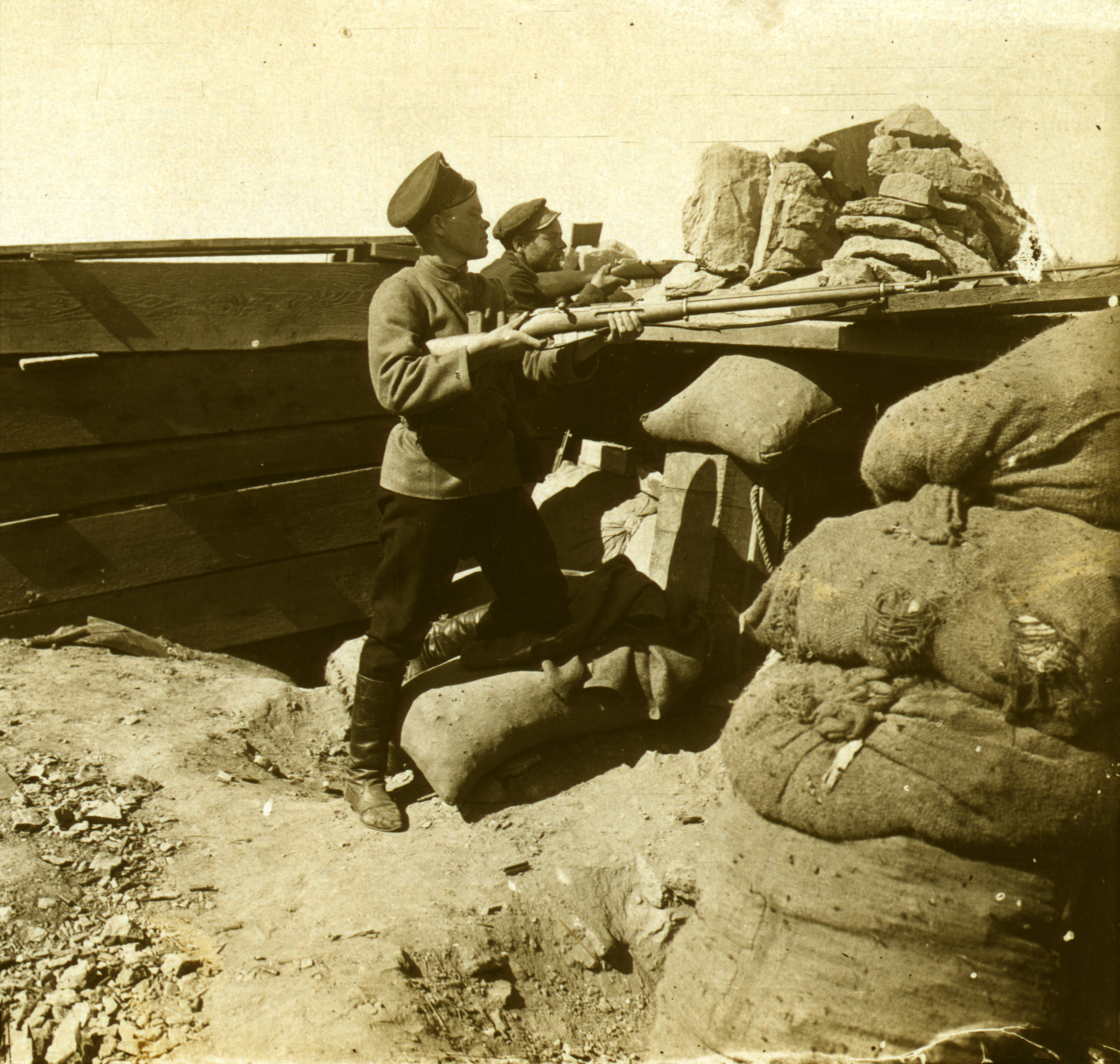
- Korotkevich on 3 October 1904, shortly before her death
- Native name: Харити́на Коротке́вич
- Born: Haritina Evstafievna Verkhozina; 17 October 1882; Nesterevaya, Tobolsk Governorate, Russian Empire
- Died: 16 October 1904 (aged 21) Port Arthur, Dalniy, Russian Empire
- Allegiance: Russia
- Rank: Ryadovoy
- Conflicts: Siege of Port Arthur
- Awards: Cross of St. George

Haritina Evstafievna Korotkevich (Russian: Харити́на Евста́фьевна Коротке́вич, also romanised as Charitina Korotkiewicz and Haritena Korotkiewich; née Verkhozina; 17 October [O.S. 5 October] 1882 – 16 October [O.S. 3 October] 1904) was a Russian soldier who served in the Imperial Russian Army during the Russo-Japanese War. Volunteering to serve disguised as a man under the pseudonym Khariton Korotkevich (Russian: Харитон Короткевич), she soon gained a reputation as a fearless leader as a woman in her own right. She was killed by shellfire on the front line during the Siege of Port Arthur.

== Early life ==
Haritina Verkhozina (Russian: Харити́на Верхо́зина) was born of humble origins in the village of Nesterevaya in the Tobolsk Governorate, the daughter of peasants. She lost her mother at the age of six and, at the age of ten, left home to work, finding employment as a dishwasher at Vargashi station. It was there that she met Jakoff Korotkevich (Russian: Яков Короткевич), with whom she fell in love and soon after married.

When her husband was called up at the start of the Russo-Japanese War, she initially remained at home, but soon afterwards decided to travel to Port Arthur to be with her husband, despite the perils that the journey held. She disguised herself as a man and worked as a brakeman on the Trans-Siberian Railway, travelling across the Chinese Eastern Railway to Harbin. Arriving in Dalian Bay, she met some soldiers attached to the same company as her husband and changed to women's clothes. Aiming to continue her journey, she was thwarted by the police who threatened to return her to Harbin. However, when she related her story with the officer responsible, he became sympathetic and together they hatched a plan for her to get to the front lines and be with her husband: she would enlist. A contemporary source said, "she took the oath of fidelity, donned her uniform, shouldered her rifle and became a man amongst men, all for Jakoff's sake."

== Service in the war ==
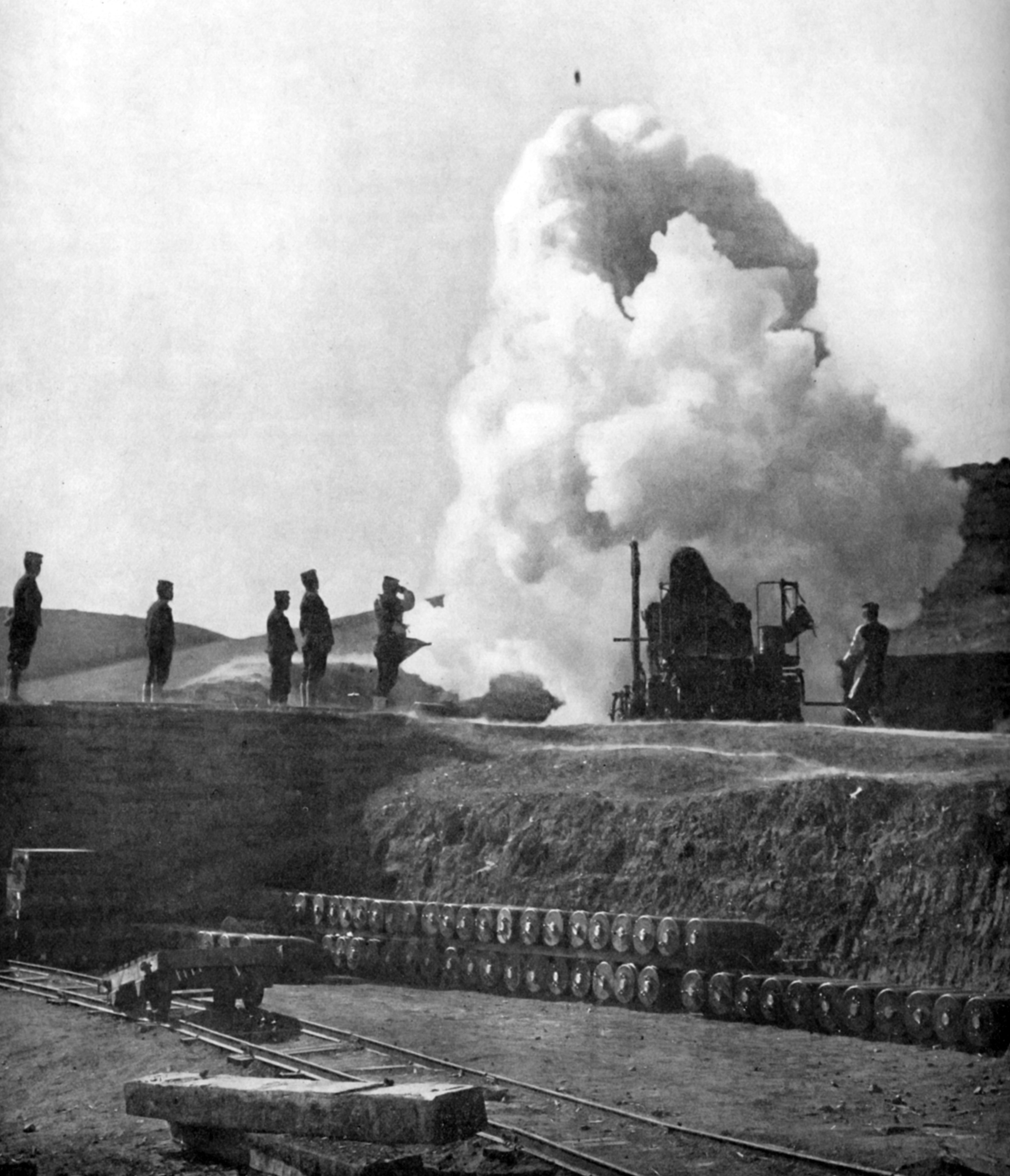
Japanese 28 cm (11 in) gun of the type that killed Korotkevich shelling Port Arthur

Adopting the masculine name Khariton, Korotkevich was initially not taken seriously, but soon proved to be an able fighter. Joining the 15th Regiment under Captain Gusakovsky, she was a charismatic leader, often leading her troop with courage and skill. In one bayonet charge, it is claimed she killed one Japanese soldier with her bayonet and wounded another with a bullet. She also showed compassion. A story is told of one time, while fighting, a Japanese soldier fell wounded beside her. She instantly dropped her rifle to care for him until the stretcher-bearers arrived. In addition, she also kept morale high among the troops, helping the men by mending clothes and, when she had leave, shopping for soap and tobacco for them.

On 19 August [O.S. 6 August] 1904, in fierce combat, Jakoff was wounded and Korotkevich accompanied him to a field hospital. She stayed with him for three weeks and only when he was out of immediate danger did she return to her unit. When she did so, she was appointed a messenger by Gusakovsky. In this capacity, she served bravely carrying critical instructions between the commander and the front line in conditions of huge risk to her life. It was during one of these missions that she died.

== Death and legacy ==
On 16 October [O.S. 3 October] 1904, the Japanese launched a massive offensive against the Russian troops. After the attack was repulsed, Gusakovsky drew up a list of requisitions, including a report of losses and a request for reserves and ammunition. He gave this to Korotkevich to take to regimental headquarters. Unfortunately, just as she was leaving the dugout, a 217 kg (478 lb) shell fired by a Japanese 28 cm (11 in) howitzer landed on the emplacement. Korotkevich was killed instantly.

Korotkevich was buried in a mass grave alongside eight others who died at the same time. On her grave was placed a wooden cross and the inscription, "Private Haritina Korotkevich, the bravest of Russian women, who fell fighting for her Czar and her country." She was awarded the Cross of St. George, one of four women to be awarded the honour during the war and the only one posthumously.

== See also ==
- Casta Álvarez
- Agustina de Aragón
- Madeleine de Verchères
