= Academy of Athens (modern) =

Academy of sciences

Coordinates: 37°58′48″N 23°44′03″E

- Established: 18 March 1926
- President: Antonios Rengakos
- Vice-President: Michael Stathopoulos
- Faculty: See text
- Address: Panepistimiou 28
- Location: Athens, Greece
- Interactive map of Academy of Athens
- Website: www.academyofathens.gr

The main building of the Academy of Athens, one of Theophil Hansen's "Trilogy" in central Athens.

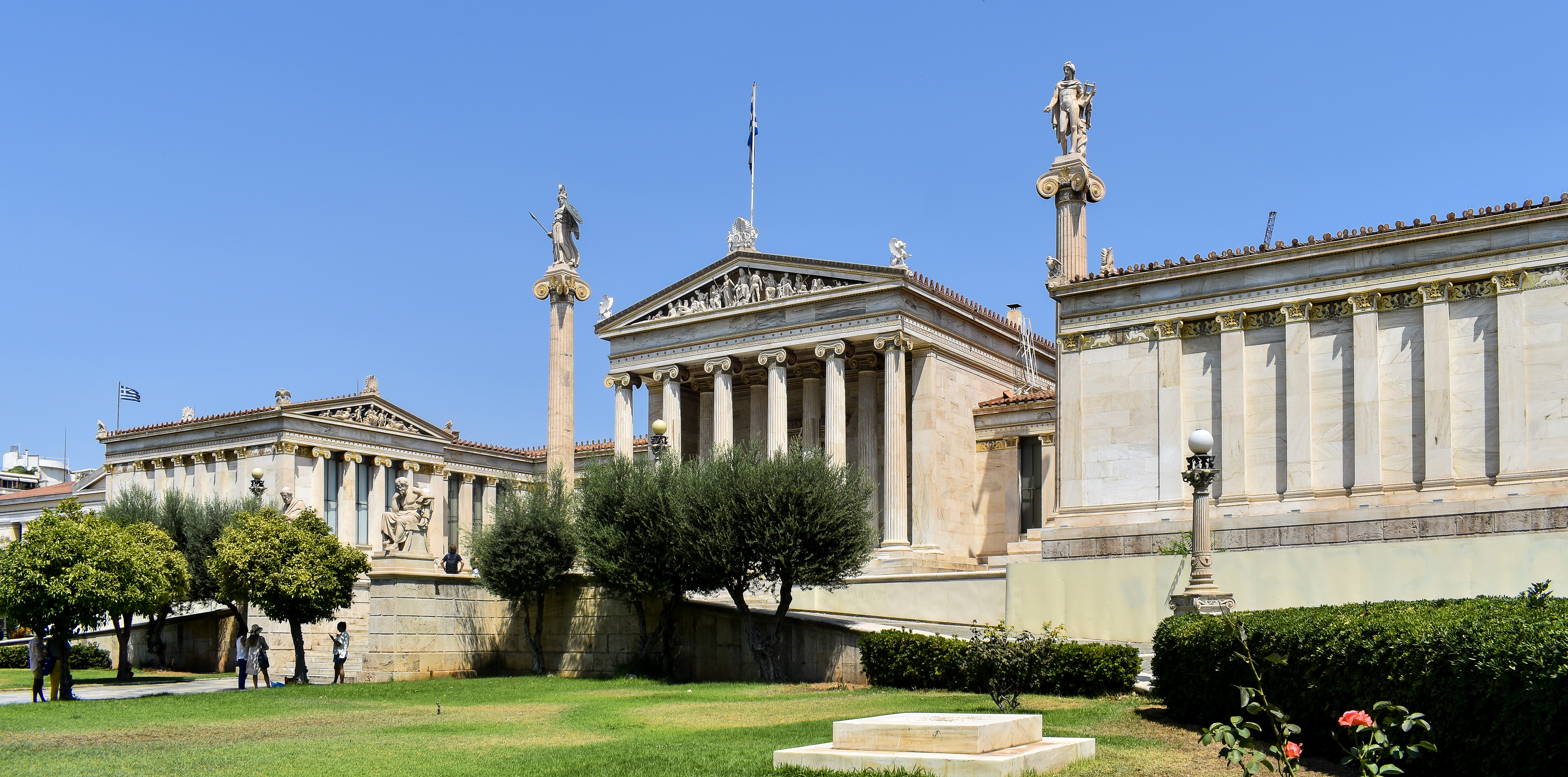
Panoramic view

The Academy of Athens (Greek: Ακαδημία Αθηνών, Akadimía Athinón) is Greece's national academy, and the highest research establishment in the country. It was established in 1926, with its founding principle tracing back to the historical Academy of Plato, and operates under the supervision of the Ministry of Education. The Academy's main building is one of the major landmarks of Athens.

== History and structure ==
The organization of the Academy of Athens, whose title hearkens back to the ancient Academy of Plato, was first established on 18 March 1926, and its charter was ratified by the law 4398/1929. This charter, with subsequent amendments, is still valid and governs the Academy's affairs. According to it, the Academy is divided into three Orders: Natural Sciences, Letters and Arts, Moral and Political Sciences.

=== Research centres ===
The Academy today, maintains 14 research centres, 5 research offices and the "Ioannis Sykoutris" library. In 2002, the Foundation for Biomedical Research of the Academy of Athens was established.

=== Membership in international organizations ===
From its foundation, the Academy of Athens has been a member of the International Association of Academies (AIA), and the International Council of Scientific Unions (ICSU). It also participates in the following body: All European Academies (ALLEA), European Academies' Science Advisory Council (EASAC), Inter Academy Council (IAC), Inter Academy Medical Panel (IAMP).

== Main building ==
The main building of the Academy is a neoclassical building between Panepistimiou Street and Akadimias Street in the centre of Athens. The building was designed as part of an architectural "trilogy" in 1859 by the Danish architect Theophil Hansen, along with the University and the National Library. Funds had been provided by the magnate Simon Sinas specifically for the purpose, and the foundation stone was laid on 2 August 1859. Construction proceeded rapidly, after 1861 under the supervision of Ernst Ziller, but the internal tumults during the latter years of King Otto's reign, which resulted in his ousting in 1862, hampered construction until it was stopped in 1864. Works resumed in 1868, but the building was not completed until 1885, at a total cost of 2,843,319 gold drachmas, most of it provided by Sinas, and, after his death, by his wife Ifigeneia.

The Greek neo-classical sculptor Leonidas Drosis sculpted the principle multi-figure pediment sculpture, on the theme of the birth of Athena, based on a design by painter Carl Rahl.

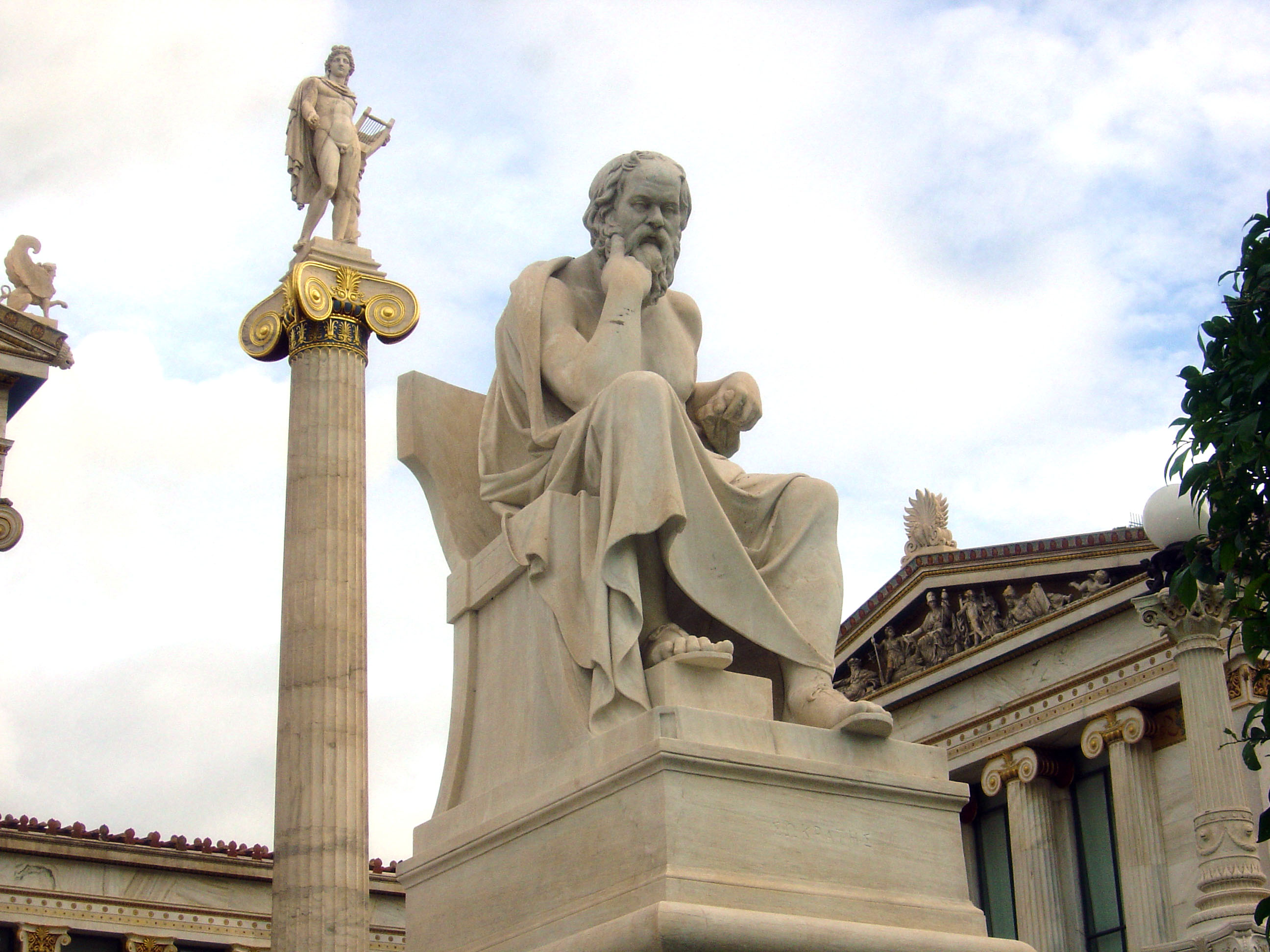
Statue of Socrates with the Apollo column in the background (by sculptor Leonidas Drosis)

This brought first prize at the Vienna Exhibition of 1873. Drosis is also responsible for the figures of Athena and Apollo with lyre on the Academy's flanking pillars, and the seated marble figures of Plato and Socrates, which were executed "by the Italian sculptor Piccarelli". The eight smaller pediments in the Academy complex are the terra-cotta work of Austrian sculptor Franz Melnitzky. Interior murals and paintings were done by the Austrian artist Christian Griepenkerl.

On 20 March 1887, the building of the "Sinaean Academy", as it was called, was delivered by Ziller to the Greek Prime Minister, Charilaos Trikoupis. In the absence of a national Academy, the building was used for housing the Numismatic Museum in 1890, and in 1914 the Byzantine Museum and the State Archives. Finally, on 24 March 1926, the building was handed over to the newly established Academy of Athens.

=== 2004 commemorative coin issue ===
Academy of Athens commemorative coin

The Academy of Athens was recently selected as main motif for a high value euro collectors' coin; the €100 Greek Academy of Athens commemorative coin, minted in 2004 to commemorate the 2004 Summer Olympics. In the obverse of the coin, a close view of the building is depicted. The intention was to highlight the premise that in the city of Athena, the Olympic Games should not only be the most important athletic event, but also reflect equal importance toward intellectual and cultural activities. All three should be equivalent to the style and character of the city that was the birthplace and the matrix for the revival of the modern Olympic Games.

== Gallery ==
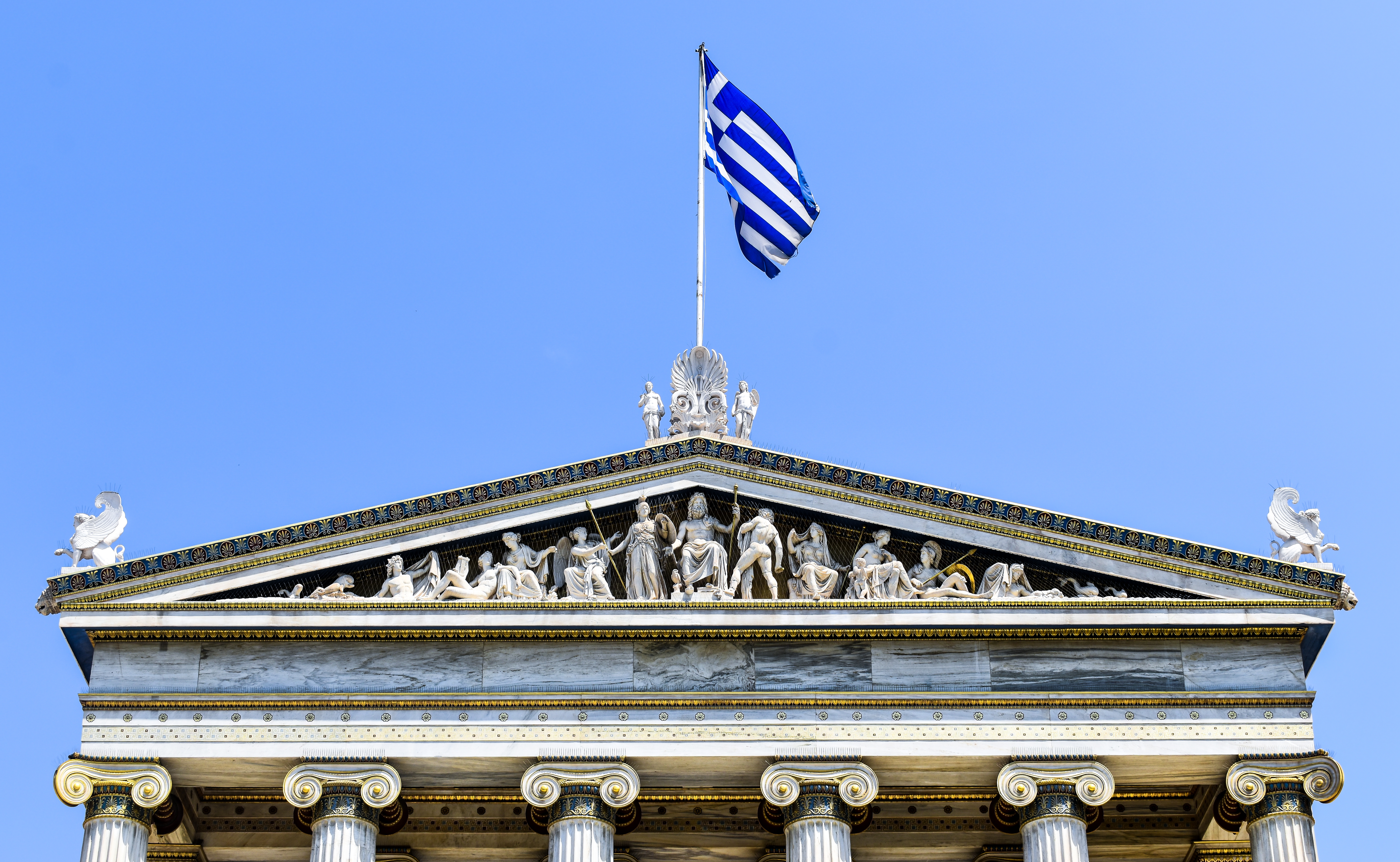
Pediment and entablature of the main entrance with Greek gods

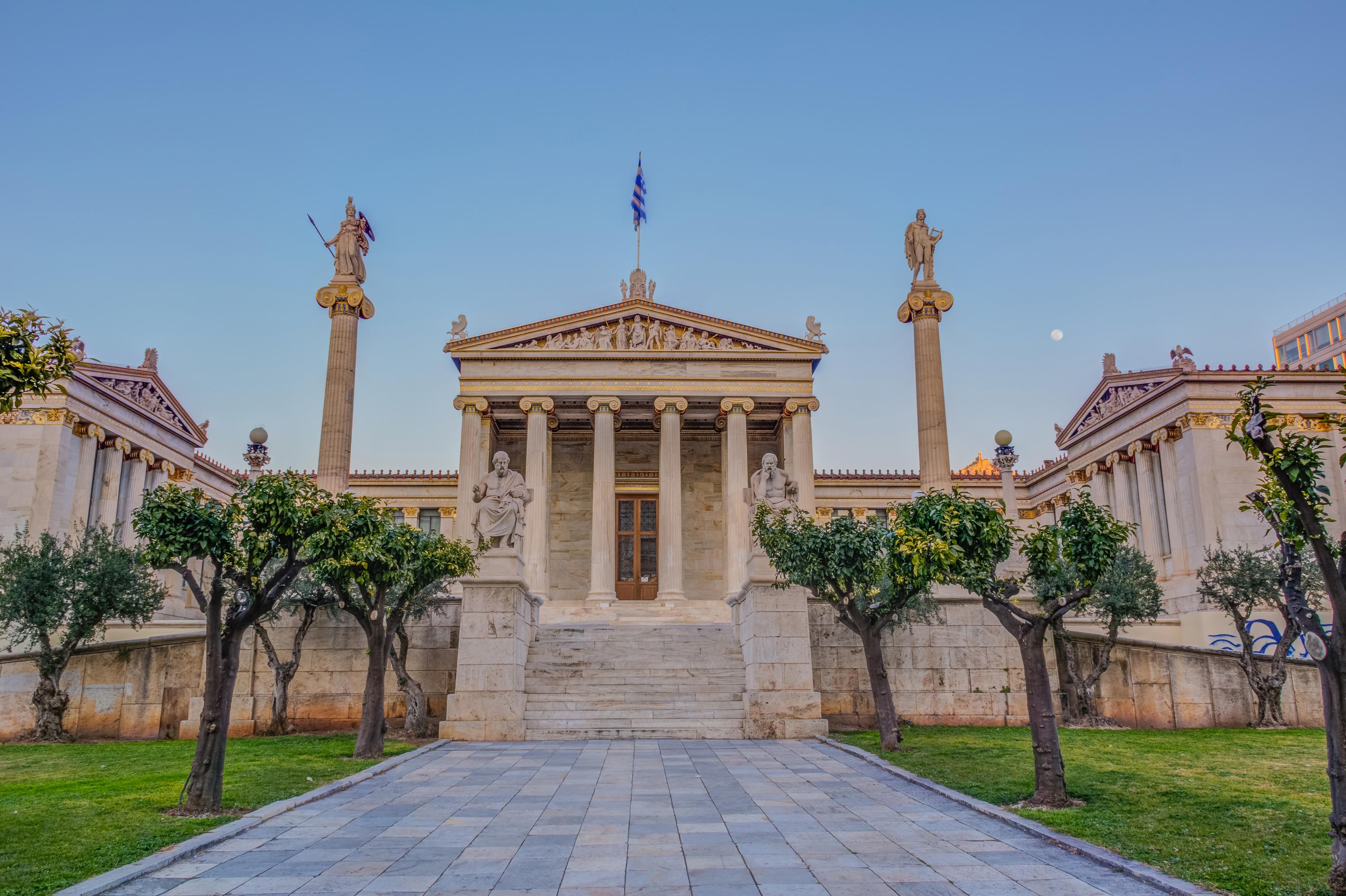
Front façade at sunset

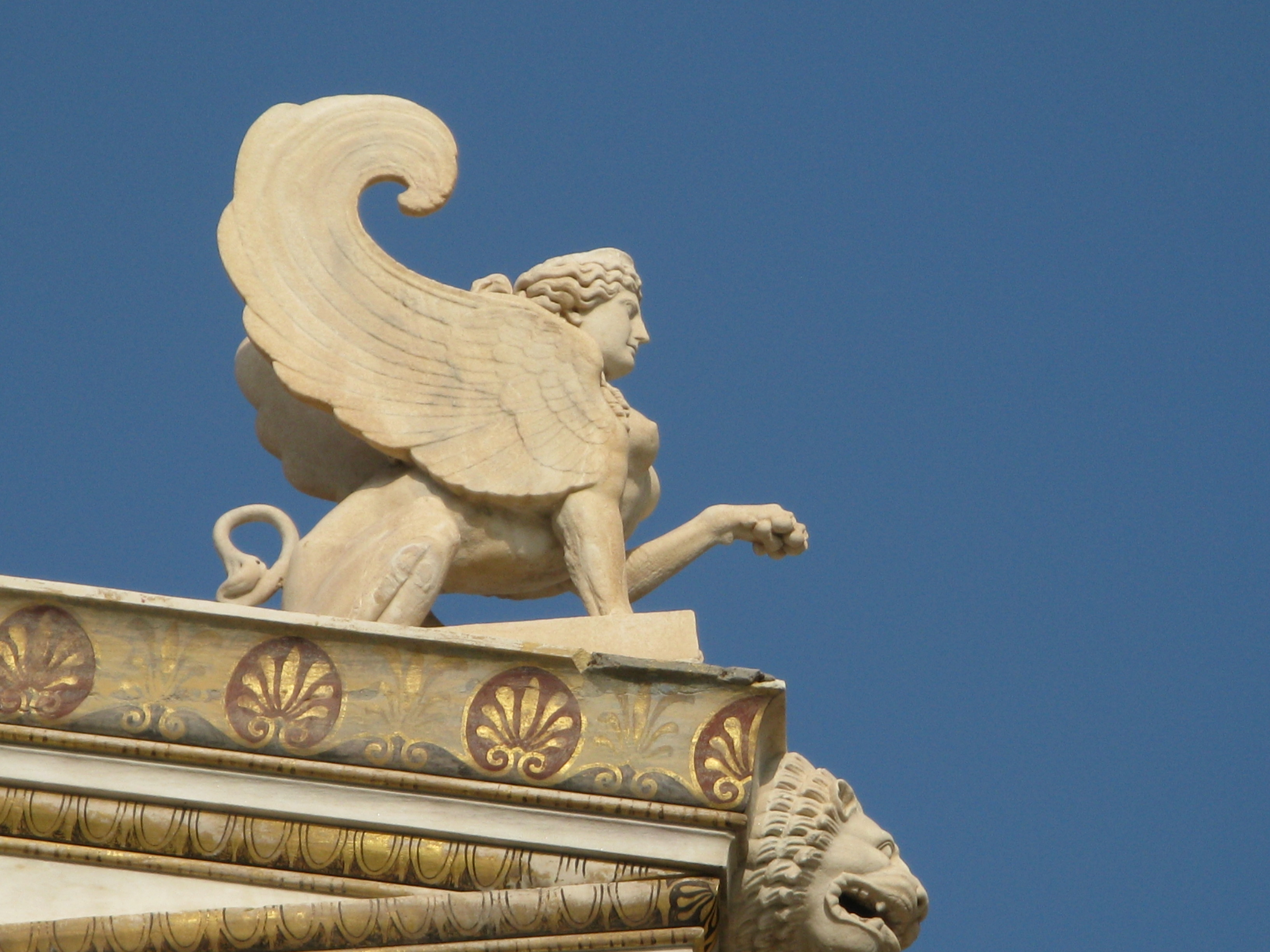
Detail of stone carving (architectural term: Acroterion) of Sphinx on the façade

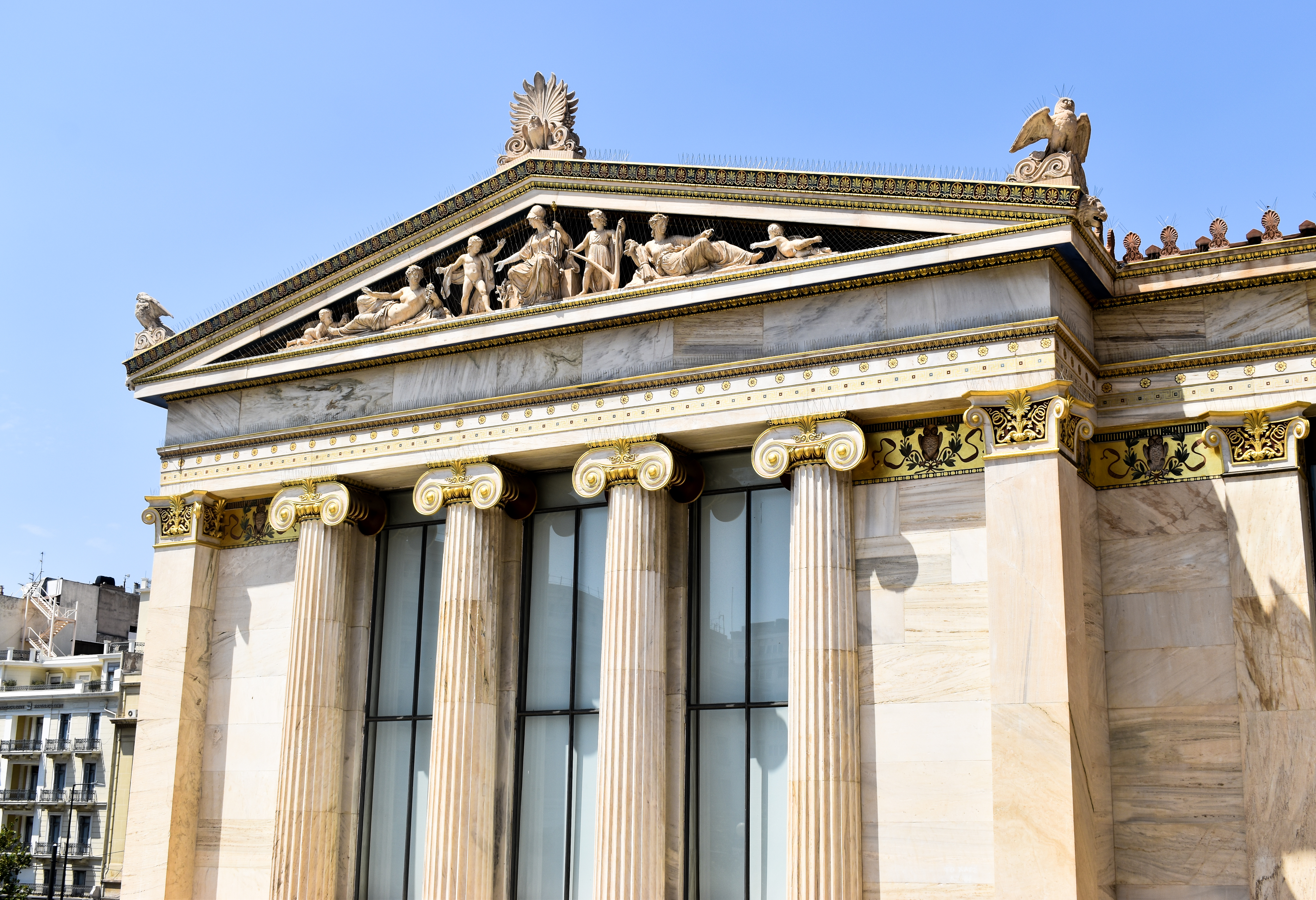
Side of the main building

Coffered ceiling in front of the main entrance.

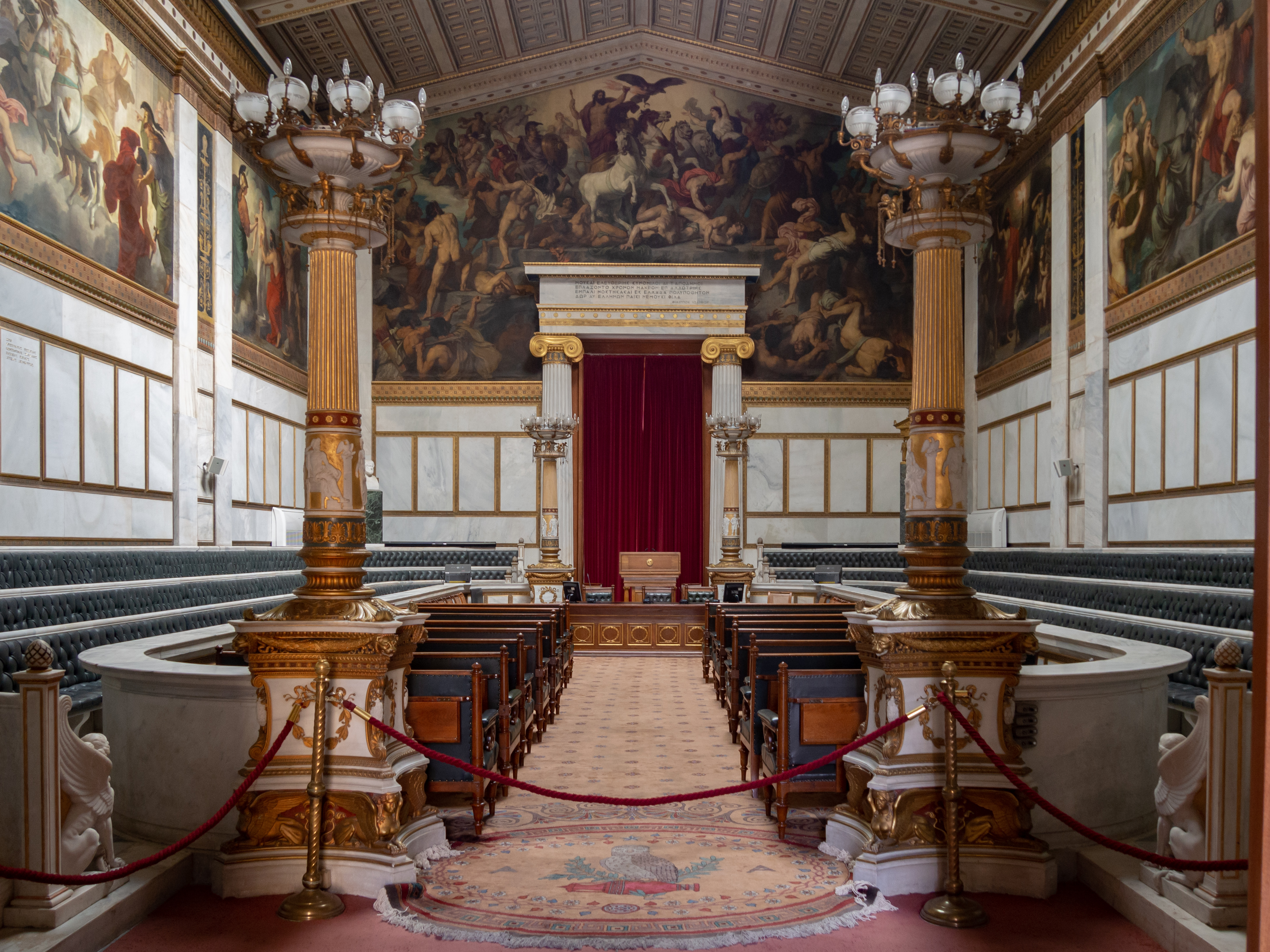
Conference hall

== See also ==
- List of members of the Academy of Athens
- Bibliotheca Alexandrina, a "restored" Library of Alexandria
- Nalanda University inspired by the ancient Nalanda mahavihara
